= Tommy Reamon =

American football player, coach and actor (1952–2025)

No. 21
- Position: Running back

Personal information
- Born: March 12, 1952; Newport News, Virginia, U.S.
- Died: May 22, 2025 (aged 73); Newport News, Virginia, U.S.

Career information
- College: Missouri
- NFL draft: 1974: 9th round, 223 WFL Draft: 1974 Round 23 / Pick 275 (By the Florida Blazers)th overall pick

Career history
- 1974: Florida Blazers
- 1975: Jacksonville Express
- 1976: Kansas City Chiefs
- 1977: Saskatchewan Roughriders

Awards and highlights
- All-WFL (1974); WFL Tri-MVP (1974)
- Stats at Pro Football Reference

Thomas Waverly Reamon Sr. (March 12, 1952 – May 22, 2025) was an American professional football player, actor and educator in the Hampton Roads region of Virginia. He played football as a running back in the National Football League (NFL), World Football League (WFL), and Canadian Football League (CFL). As a high school football coach, Reamon had some notable success in developing talent to become collegiate and professional football players among his students.

== College career ==
Reamon came out of the George Washington Carver High School in Newport News, Virginia. In 1971–1972 as a running back, he would be named a two-time National Junior College All-American and offensive player of the year at Fort Scott Junior College, Kansas, He would lead the NJCAA in rushing yards and touchdowns as well as leading Fort Scott to consecutive NJCAA National Championship games, winning the first and losing the second. He would later be inducted into the NJCAA Hall of Fame (1998). He went on to be a running back at the University of Missouri.

== Professional career ==
Reamon was drafted in the ninth round of the 1974 NFL Draft by the Pittsburgh Steelers of the NFL, and by the Florida Blazers in the World Football League's College Draft. He was selected in round 29 by the Blazers. Reamon went on to stardom in the World Football League, and was named one of the league's MVPs in 1974 as a member of the Blazers. He helped lead Florida to the first and only World Bowl game coming up short against the Birmingham Americans 22-21. A year later, he joined the Jacksonville Express of the WFL. After the WFL folded in 1975, Reamon joined the Pittsburgh Steelers. He scored a touchdown for the Steelers in the last game ever played between the NFL Super Bowl Champions and College All-Stars. During the 1976 pre-season, the Steelers traded Reamon to the Kansas City Chiefs. Reamon holds the WFL records for most rushing yards in a game (189), Season (1576) and in the World Bowl (83). He gained a total of 750 yards from scrimmage and scored five touchdowns in 1976 for the Kansas City Chiefs. Reamon would go on to play for the Saskatchewan Roughriders in the CFL in 1977 after a failed try out for the Chicago Bears who were coached by former Blazers Head Coach Jack Pardee. While with the Bears during the 1977 pre-season, Reamon played in the NFC-AFC Hall of Fame game against the New York Jets. After the 1977 CFL season, he had a tryout for the Washington Redskins in 1978 and again played under his former WFL Florida Blazers Head Coach, Jack Pardee. Although Reamon was the leading rusher during the 1978 pre-season the Redskins cut Tommy Reamon.

== Acting ==
Reamon went into acting after his football career ended, playing the role of Delma Huddle in the 1979 movie North Dallas Forty, and appeared in several episodes of the TV series Charlie's Angels between 1978 and 1982. He also appeared on episodes of Quincy, M.E. and The Fall Guy.

== High school football coach ==
Reamon coached with the Newport News Public Schools for a number of years. He was at Ferguson High School until it was closed during a building modernization program in 1996. He then moved to Warwick High School.

From 2006 until early 2008, Tommy Reamon was employed coaching high school football at Gloucester High School in Gloucester County in the Virginia's Middle Peninsula region at the northern edge of Hampton Roads. At Gloucester High School, Coach Reamon's son Tommy Jr. was a national prospect at quarterback and considered a rising football star with collegiate potential, according to observers. Reamon Jr. had offers raining in from several Division 1 programs across the country but subsequently selected Old Dominion University in Norfolk where he headlined the first recruiting class in program history. Until his death, he was coaching on the collegiate level at Virginia Tech. Reamon Jr. also had other notable coaching stops: the University of Virginia, Pittsburgh Steelers, and the University of Miami.

In April 2008, it was announced that Reamon had accepted a position with Virginia Beach City Public Schools as Head Football coach at Landstown High School in Virginia Beach. In 2017 The Landstown Eagles team 12-1, with a D6, Eastern Regional Playoff final. Reamon led the Landstown to VHSL playoffs seven of the past ten seasons.

In 2023, Reamon accepted the position of head football coach at Denbigh High School in Newport News. He was recruited by Denbigh High alumnus and current Steelers head coach Mike Tomlin for the position at Franco Harris' wake in Pittsburgh.

== Notable players under tutelage ==
In his tenure with Newport News Public Schools, Coach Reamon was noted for helping develop future NFL quarterbacks Aaron Brooks and Michael Vick. He also coached Marcus Vick, Michael's younger brother. Reamon assisted Brooks with his transition to the University of Virginia, and later, each of the Vick brothers at Virginia Tech, where they each received full scholarships.

After graduating from UVA. Brooks played for the Green Bay Packers; the New Orleans Saints, where he was the starting quarterback for six years; and the Oakland Raiders, during his last season in 2006. In 2008, he announced plans to invest in a redevelopment project in the economically depressed East End area of his hometown of Newport News. Earlier in 2008, he announced plans to invest in Southeast Commerce Center, a redevelopment project his hometown of Newport News. The multimillion-dollar investment will be a mixed-use development with 190 town houses, a grocery store and retail offerings. Brooks commented to Newport News Daily Press: "It's a great opportunity to give back to the community...a lot of hard-working, middle-class people that live in the area. I'm just trying to make the area better for them."

== Personal life and death ==
Reamon suffered a stroke in early 2025. He died on May 22, 2025, at the age of 73.
