= Michael Vick =

American football player and coach (born 1980)

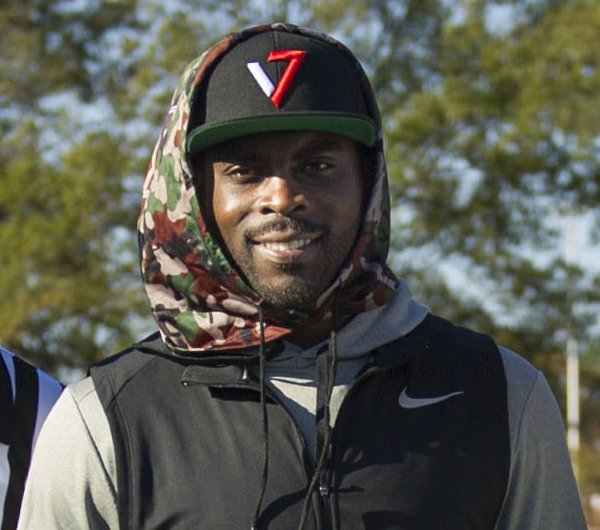
- Vick in 2017

Norfolk State Spartans
- Title: Head coach

Personal information
- Born: June 26, 1980 (age 46); Newport News, Virginia, U.S.
- Listed height: 6 ft 0 in (1.83 m)
- Listed weight: 210 lb (95 kg)

Career information
- Position: Quarterback (No. 7, 1, 2)
- High school: Warwick (Newport News)
- College: Virginia Tech (1998–2000)
- NFL draft: 2001: 1st round, 1st overall pick

Career history

Playing
- Atlanta Falcons (2001–2006); Philadelphia Eagles (2009–2013); New York Jets (2014); Pittsburgh Steelers (2015)

Coaching
- Atlanta Legends (2019) Advisor; Norfolk State (2025–present) Head coach

Awards and highlights
- NFL Comeback Player of the Year (2010); 4× Pro Bowl (2002, 2004, 2005, 2010); Bert Bell Award (2010); Archie Griffin Award (1999); First-team All-American (1999); Big East Offensive Player of the Year (1999); Big East Rookie of the Year (1999); NFL records: Career yards per carry (Note: Minimum 750 career rushing attempts.): 7.0; Yards per carry in a single season (Note: Minimum 6.25 rushing attempts per team game.): 8.4 (2006)

Career NFL statistics
- Passing attempts: 3,217
- Passing completions: 1,807
- Completion percentage: 56.2%
- TD–INT: 133–88
- Passing yards: 22,464
- Passer rating: 80.4
- Rushing yards: 6,109
- Rushing touchdowns: 36
- Stats at Pro Football Reference

Head coaching record
- Career: NCAA: 5–17 (.227)
- College Football Hall of Fame

Michael Dwayne Vick (born June 26, 1980) is a former professional American football quarterback and currently the head coach for the Norfolk State Spartans. He played in the National Football League (NFL) for 13 seasons and ranks second in quarterback rushing yards, which he led at the time of his retirement. Vick played college football at Virginia Tech, winning the Archie Griffin Award and Big East Offensive Player of the Year in 1999. He was selected first overall by the Atlanta Falcons in the 2001 NFL draft. During his six years with the Falcons, he was named to three Pro Bowls and led the team to two playoff runs, one division title, and an NFC Championship Game appearance.

Vick's NFL career came to a halt in 2007 after he pleaded guilty for his involvement in a dog fighting ring and spent 21 months in federal prison. His arrest and subsequent conviction garnered Vick notoriety with the general public, which lasted throughout the rest of his career. He was released by the Falcons shortly before leaving prison.

After serving his sentence, Vick signed with the Philadelphia Eagles for the 2009 season. As a member of the Eagles for five years, he had his greatest statistical season and led the team to a division title in 2010, earning him Comeback Player of the Year and a fourth Pro Bowl selection. In his final two seasons, Vick played for the New York Jets and Pittsburgh Steelers, primarily as a backup. He officially retired in 2017 after spending the 2016 season as a free agent. After retiring as a player, Vick pursued a coaching career and was named the head football coach at Norfolk State in 2024.

== Early life ==
Vick was born in Newport News, Virginia, as the third of four children to Brenda Vick and Michael Boddie, then unmarried teenagers. His mother worked two jobs, obtained public financial assistance and had help from her parents, while his father worked long hours in the shipyards as a sandblaster and spray-painter. They were married when Michael was about five years old, but the children elected to continue to use their "Vick" surname. The family lived in the Ridley Circle Homes, a public housing project in a financially depressed and crime-ridden neighborhood located in the East End section of the port city. Local residents interviewed in a 2007 newspaper article in the Richmond Times-Dispatch noted that "not much [had] changed" nearly a decade after Vick left. One resident said that there was drug dealing, drive-by shootings, and other killings in the neighborhood, and suggested that sports were a way out and a dream for many. In a 2001 interview, Vick told the Newport News Daily Press that when he was 10 or 11, "I would go fishing even if the fish weren't biting, just to get away from the violence and stress of daily life in the projects."

Boddie's employment required a great deal of travel, but he taught football skills to his two sons at an early age. Vick was only three years old when his father, nicknamed "Bullet" for his speed during his own playing days, began teaching him the fundamentals. Michael subsequently taught the game to his younger brother, Marcus Vick.

As he grew up, Vick went by the nickname "Ookie", and learned about football from Aaron Brooks, a second cousin who was four years older. Vick and Brooks spent a lot of time at the local Boys and Girls Club. "Sports kept me off the streets," Vick told Sporting News magazine in an interview published April 9, 2001. "It kept me from getting into what was going on, the bad stuff. Lots of guys I knew have had bad problems."

=== High school career ===
Vick first came to prominence while at Homer L. Ferguson High School in Newport News. As a freshman, he impressed many with his athletic ability; he threw for over 400 yards in a game that year. Ferguson High School was closed in 1996 as part of a Newport News Public Schools building modernization program. Vick, as a sophomore, and coach Tommy Reamon both moved to Warwick High School.

Vick was a three-year starter for the Warwick Raiders. Under Reamon's coaching, he passed for 4,846 yards with 43 touchdowns. He added 1,048 yards and 18 scores on the ground. As a senior, he passed for 1,668 yards, accounting for 10 passing and as many rushing touchdowns. During one game, he ran for six touchdowns and threw for three touchdowns.

Reamon, who had helped guide Brooks from Newport News to the University of Virginia, helped Vick with his SATs and helped him and his family choose between Syracuse University and Virginia Tech. Reamon favored Virginia Tech, where he felt better guidance was available under Frank Beamer, who promised to redshirt him and provide the freshman needed time to develop. Reamon sold Michael on the school's proximity to family and friends, and Vick chose to attend Virginia Tech. As he left the Newport News public housing projects in 1998 with a college football scholarship in hand, Vick was seen in the Newport News community as a success story.

== College career ==
=== 1999 season ===
In his first collegiate game for Virginia Tech as a redshirt freshman, against James Madison in 1999, Vick scored three rushing touchdowns in just over one quarter of play. He performed a flip to score his last touchdown but landed awkwardly on his ankle, forcing him to miss the remainder of the game and all of the following game. During the season, Vick led a last-minute game-winning drive against West Virginia in the annual Black Diamond Trophy game. He led the Hokies to an 11–0 undefeated season and to the Bowl Championship Series national title game in the Nokia Sugar Bowl against Florida State. Although Virginia Tech lost 46–29, Vick brought the team back from a 21-point deficit to take a brief lead. During the season, Vick appeared on the cover of an ESPN The Magazine issue.

External image
- Vick on the Cover of Sports Illustrated

Vick led the NCAA in passing efficiency in 1999, a record for a freshman (180.4) and the third-highest all-time mark. Vick won both an ESPY Award as the nation's top college player and the first-ever Archie Griffin Award as college football's most valuable player. He won the Big East Offensive Player of the Year. He was invited to the 1999 Heisman Trophy presentation and finished third in the voting behind Ron Dayne and Joe Hamilton. Vick's third-place finish matched the highest finish ever by a freshman up to that point, first set by Herschel Walker in 1980.

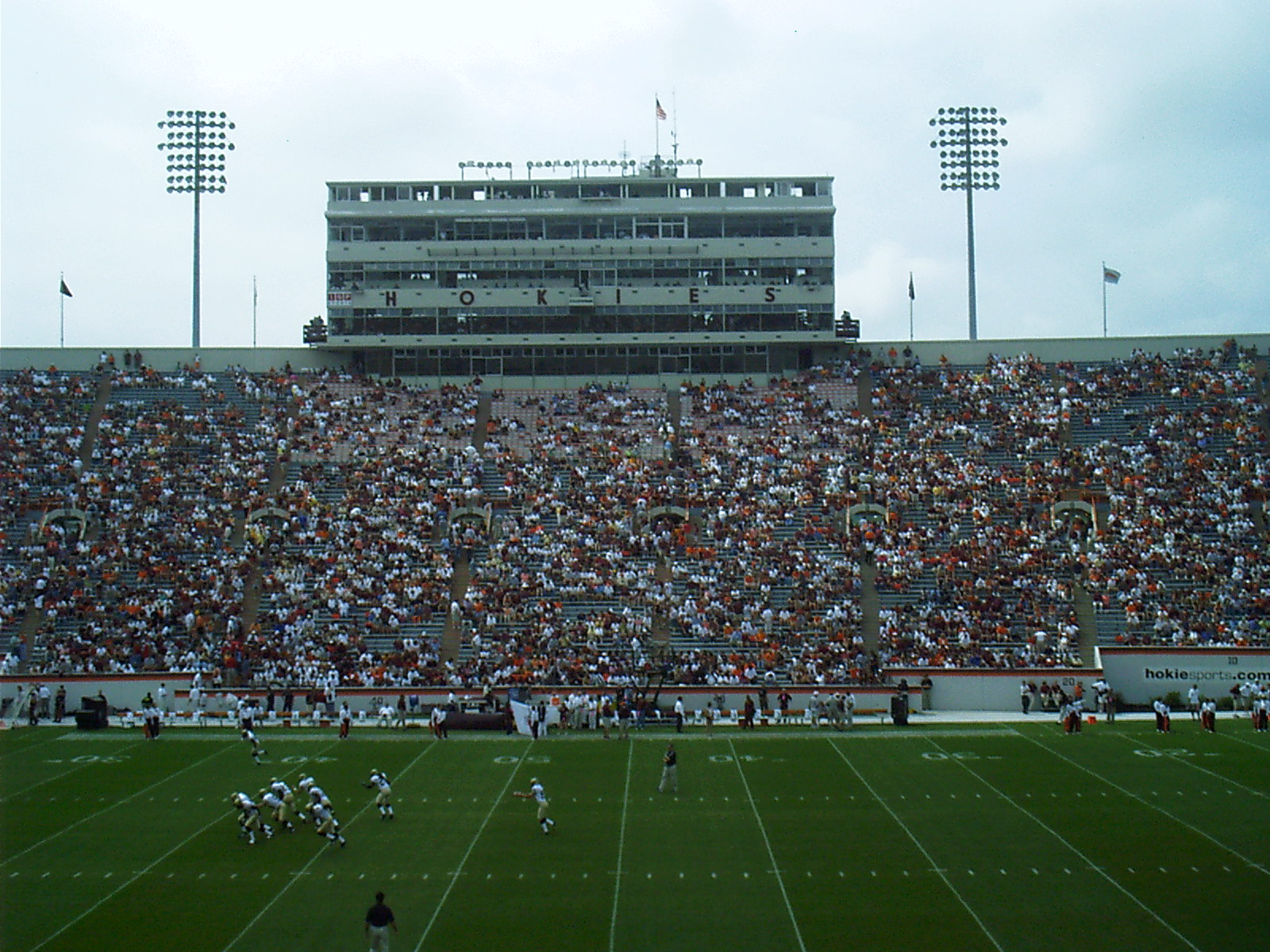
Lane Stadium, where Vick played college football for Virginia Tech

=== 2000 season ===
One highlight of Vick's 2000 season was his career high rushing total of 210 yards against Boston College in Chestnut Hill, Massachusetts. Against West Virginia University in the Black Diamond Trophy game, Vick accounted for 288 total yards of offense and two touchdowns in a 48–20 win. The following week, Vick led the Hokies back from a 14–0 deficit to beat Syracuse at the Carrier Dome, where the Hokies had not won since 1986. Vick put the game away with a 55-yard run with 1:34 left.

In the following game, against Pittsburgh, Vick was injured and had to miss the rest of the game. He also missed the game against Central Florida, and was unable to start against the Miami Hurricanes, who handed Virginia Tech their only loss of the season. Vick's final game while playing for Virginia Tech was against the Clemson Tigers in the Toyota Gator Bowl; Virginia Tech won and Vick was named the game's MVP. His football accomplishments in two seasons led to his induction in to the Virginia Tech Sports Hall of Fame in 2017.

Vick finished sixth in Heisman Trophy voting for the 2000 season. Vick left Virginia Tech after his redshirt sophomore season. Aware that the rest of his family was still living in their three-bedroom apartment in the Ridley Circle Homes, Vick stated that he was going to buy his mother "a home and a car." ESPN later reported that Vick used some of his NFL and endorsement earnings to buy his mother a brand-new house in an upscale section of Suffolk, Virginia.

Vick was inducted into the College Football Hall of Fame in 2025.

== Professional career ==
Pre-draft measurables
Height	Weight	Arm length	Hand span	40-yard dash	Vertical jump	Wonderlic
6 ft 0 in (1.83 m)	210 lb (95 kg)	31 1/2 in (0.80 m)	8 1/2 in (0.22 m)	4.33 s	38.0 in (0.97 m)	20
All values from NFL Combine

=== Atlanta Falcons ===
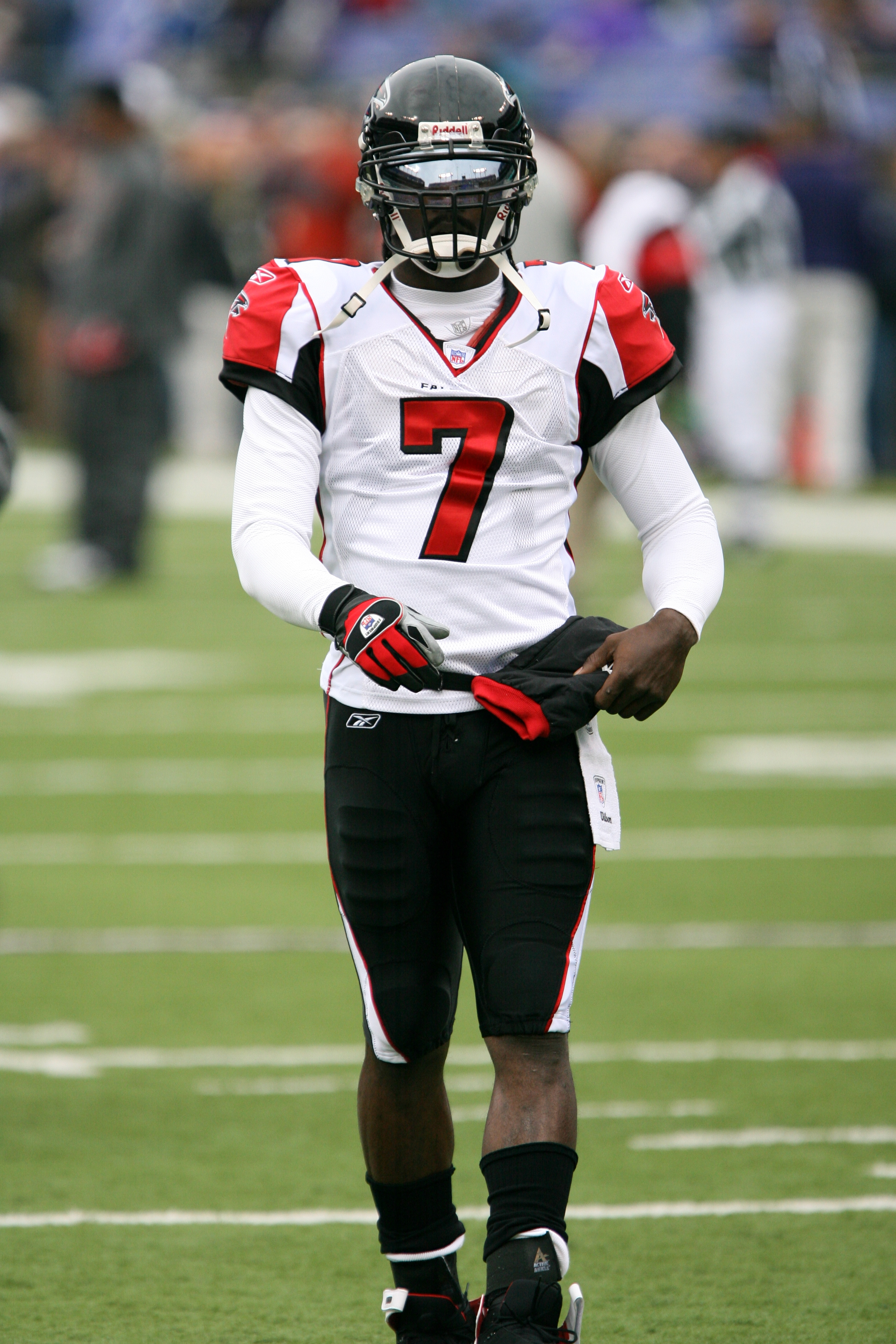
Vick in Baltimore with the Atlanta Falcons during the 2006 season

At his Pro Day workout, Vick ran the 40-yard dash in 4.33 seconds; his time has been clocked as low as 4.25, the fastest-ever for an NFL quarterback. Vick was selected first in the 2001 NFL draft by the Atlanta Falcons, becoming the first African-American quarterback to be taken with the top pick. The San Diego Chargers had the number-one selection, but traded it to the Atlanta Falcons the day before the draft for the Falcons' first- and third-round picks in 2001. Vick was selected in the 30th round of the 2000 Major League Baseball draft by the Colorado Rockies, despite not playing baseball since the eighth grade.

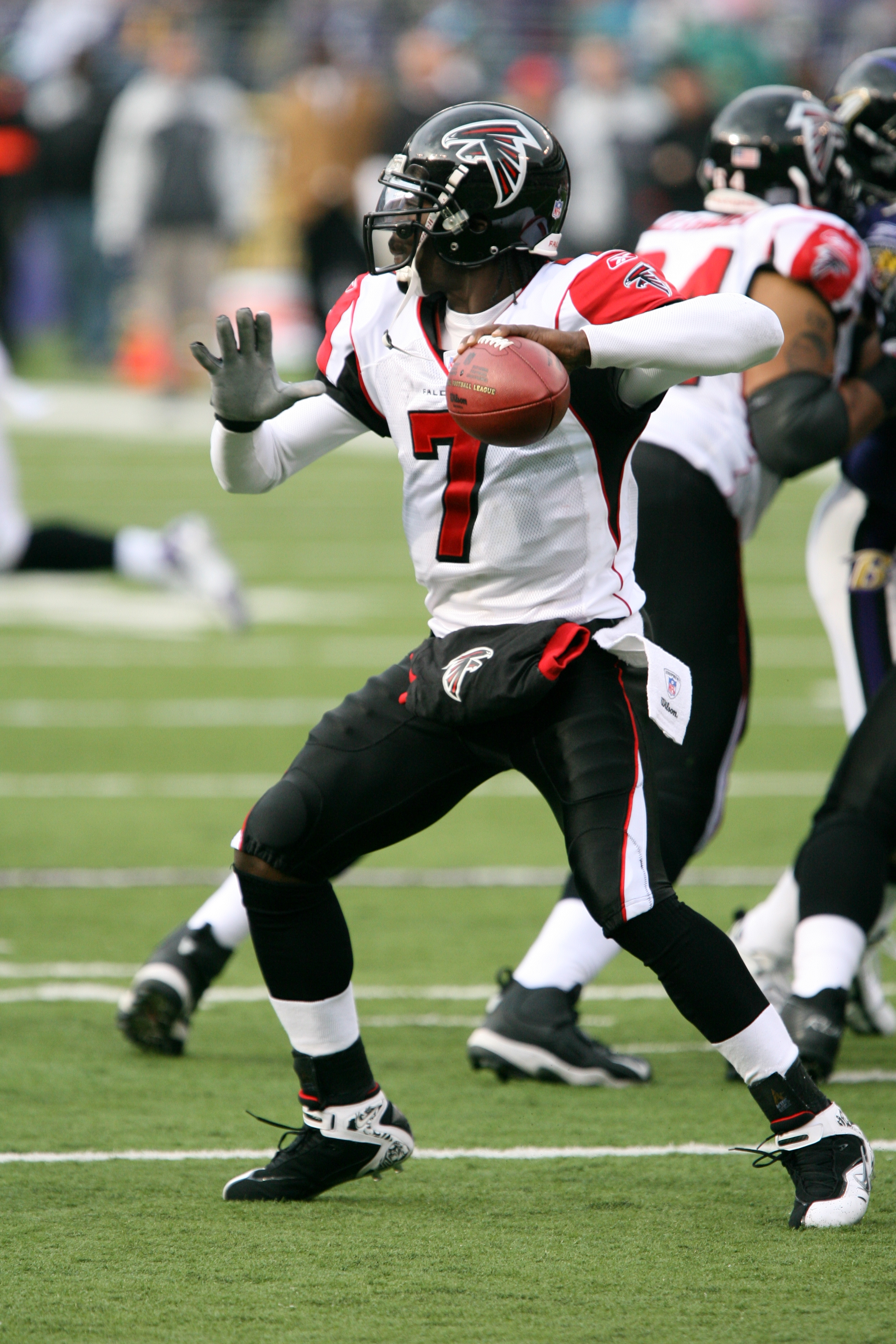
Vick as a member of the Atlanta Falcons in November 2006

He signed a six-year $62 million contract.

==== 2001 season ====
Vick made his NFL debut against the San Francisco 49ers on September 9, 2001, and saw limited action. He completed his first NFL pass to wide receiver Tony Martin in the second quarter against the Carolina Panthers on September 23 and scored his first NFL touchdown on a two-yard rush in the fourth quarter to help the Falcons to a 24–16 victory. Vick made his first start against the Dallas Cowboys on November 11 and threw his first touchdown pass to tight end Alge Crumpler in a 20–13 victory. He accounted for 234 of Atlanta's 255 yards in the season finale against the St. Louis Rams on January 6, 2002. In two starts and eight total games played that season, Vick completed 50 of 113 passes for 785 yards with two touchdowns and three interceptions. He rushed 31 times for 289 yards (9.3 avg.) and one touchdown.

==== 2002 season ====
Vick made 15 starts in 2002, missing one game against the New York Giants on October 13 with a sprained shoulder. He completed 231 of 421 passes for 2,936 yards and 16 touchdowns. He had 113 carries for 777 yards and eight rushing touchdowns. Vick set numerous single-game career highs during the season, including in passes completed, pass attempts, and passing yards. Vick also set a then-NFL record for most rushing yards by a quarterback in a single game with 173 against the Minnesota Vikings on December 1, broken by Colin Kaepernick (181) in 2013. He tied for third in team history for the best touchdown-to-interception ratio in a season. He had a streak of 177 passes without an interception as the Falcons finished with a 9–6–1 win-loss-tie record and reached the playoffs. On January 4, 2003, Vick led the Falcons to an upset victory over the heavily favored Green Bay Packers 27–7 in the NFC Wild Card Round. The Falcons lost 20–6 to the Donovan McNabb-led Philadelphia Eagles in the NFC Divisional Round the following week. Vick was named to his first Pro Bowl after the season.

==== 2003 season ====
Vick suffered a fractured right fibula during a preseason game before the 2003 season against the Baltimore Ravens. He missed the first 11 games of the regular season, making his debut in week 13. Vick substituted for quarterback Doug Johnson during the third quarter in a game against the Houston Texans on November 30, completing 8 of 11 passes for 60 yards and rushing for 16 yards on three carries. He started his first game of the season against the Carolina Panthers on December 7 and amassed the third-highest rushing total by a quarterback in NFL history with 141 yards on 14 carries and one touchdown. The Falcons won the game 20–14 in overtime. Vick ended the season with a 21–14 victory over the Jacksonville Jaguars on December 28 in which he completed 12 of 22 passes for 180 yards, two touchdowns, and an interception.

==== 2004 season ====
Vick returned to form in 2004, passing for 2,313 yards, 14 touchdowns, and 12 interceptions. He also added 902 rushing yards and three touchdowns as the Falcons finished with an 11–5 record. On October 31, 2004, in a game against the Denver Broncos, he became the first quarterback to throw for more than 250 yards and rush for over 100 yards in the same game. Vick set an NFL postseason record for a quarterback with 119 rushing yards in the first round of the 2004 NFL playoffs; Atlanta beat the St. Louis Rams 47–17 in the Divisional Round, but lost the following week 27–10 to the Philadelphia Eagles in the NFC Championship. Vick, whose single-season rushing total was the third-highest for a quarterback in NFL history, was named to his second Pro Bowl after leading Atlanta to their third division title at the end of the season. He signed a nine-year $130 million extension on December 23. Vick finished second in the NFL MVP voting earning one first place vote, preventing Peyton Manning to be a unanimous choice.

==== 2005 season ====
Vick made his third Pro Bowl after the 2005 season, during which he passed for 2,412 yards and 16 touchdowns while rushing for 597 rushing yards and six touchdowns. The Falcons, however, finished with an 8–8 record and missed the playoffs.

==== 2006 season ====
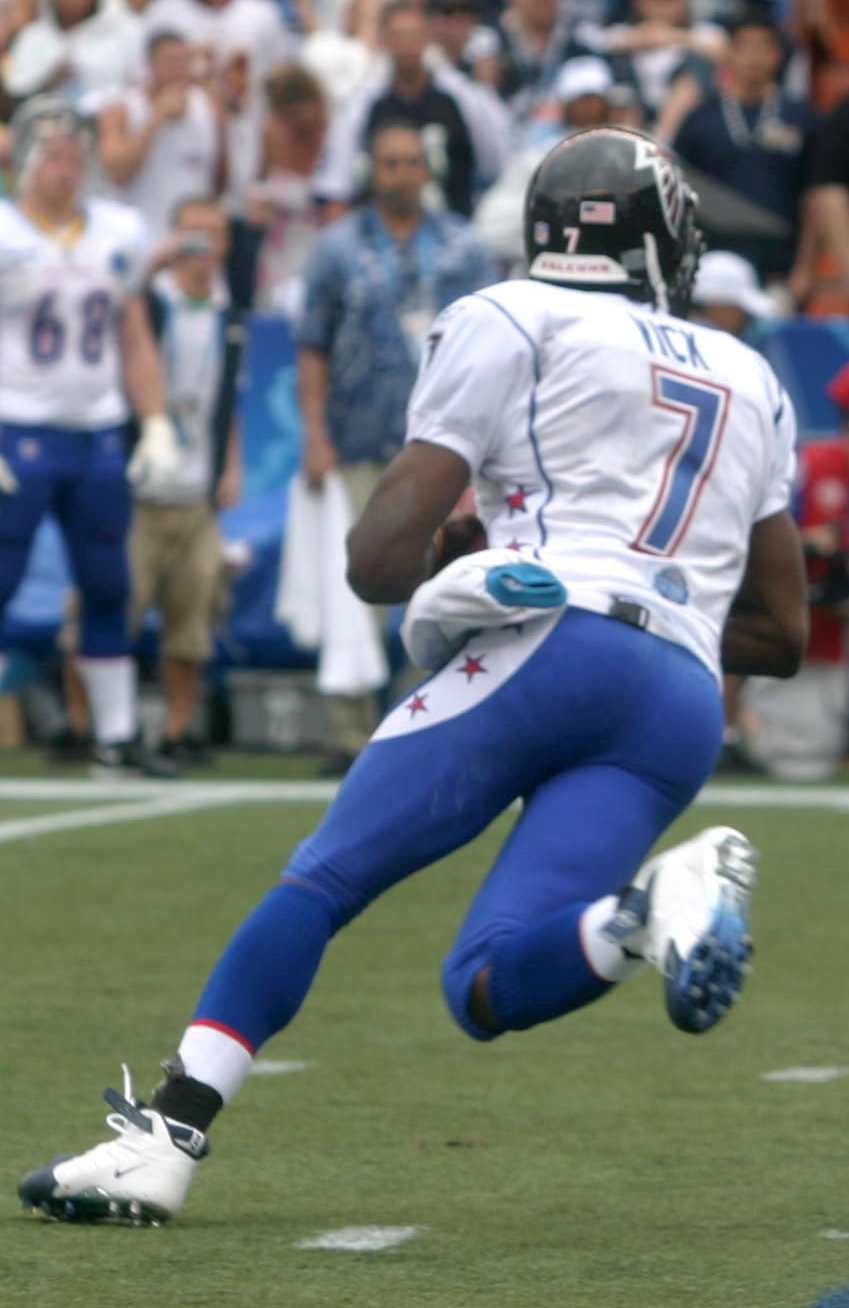
Vick at the 2006 Pro Bowl

In 2006, Vick became the first quarterback to ever rush for over 1,000 yards in a single season. He also set a record by rushing for 8.4 yards per carry. Vick and teammate Warrick Dunn became the first quarterback-running back duo to each surpass 1,000 rushing yards in a single season. Despite Vick's record-setting season, the Falcons finished with a 7–9 record and again missed the playoffs.

=== Dog Fighting charges ===
In August 2007, hours after Vick pleaded guilty to federal charges in the Bad Newz Kennels dog fighting investigation, the NFL suspended him indefinitely without pay for violating its player conduct policy. In a letter to Vick, NFL commissioner Roger Goodell said the quarterback had admitted to conduct that was "not only illegal, but also cruel and reprehensible." While Vick was technically a first-time offender under the league's personal conduct policy, Goodell handed down a harsher suspension because Vick admitted he provided most of the money for the gambling side of the dog fighting operation. Goodell left open the possibility of reinstating Vick depending on how he cooperated with federal and state authorities. Goodell had barred Vick from reporting to training camp while the league conducted its own investigation into the matter. At his July 26 arraignment, the terms of his bail barred him from leaving Virginia before the November trial– effectively ending any realistic chance of Vick playing a down in 2007.

On August 27, Falcons owner Arthur Blank said at a press conference that the Falcons would seek to recover a portion of Vick's signing bonus. He said the team had no immediate plans to cut Vick, citing salary-cap issues. It initially appeared that Goodell had cleared the way for the Falcons to release Vick, since he ruled that Vick's involvement in gambling activity breached his contract. On August 29, the Falcons sent a letter to Vick demanding that he reimburse them for $20 million of his $37 million bonus. The case was sent to arbitration, and on October 10, an arbitrator ruled that Vick had to reimburse the Falcons for $19.97 million. The arbitrator agreed with the Falcons' contention that Vick knew he was engaging in illegal activity when he signed his new contract in 2004, and that he had used the bonus money to pay for the operation.

In February 2009, the Falcons revealed that they were considering trading Vick to another NFL team. Atlanta general manager Thomas Dimitroff said NFL rules allowed teams to trade the contractual rights to suspended players. The Falcons released Vick in early June, however, making him an unrestricted free agent.

=== Philadelphia Eagles ===
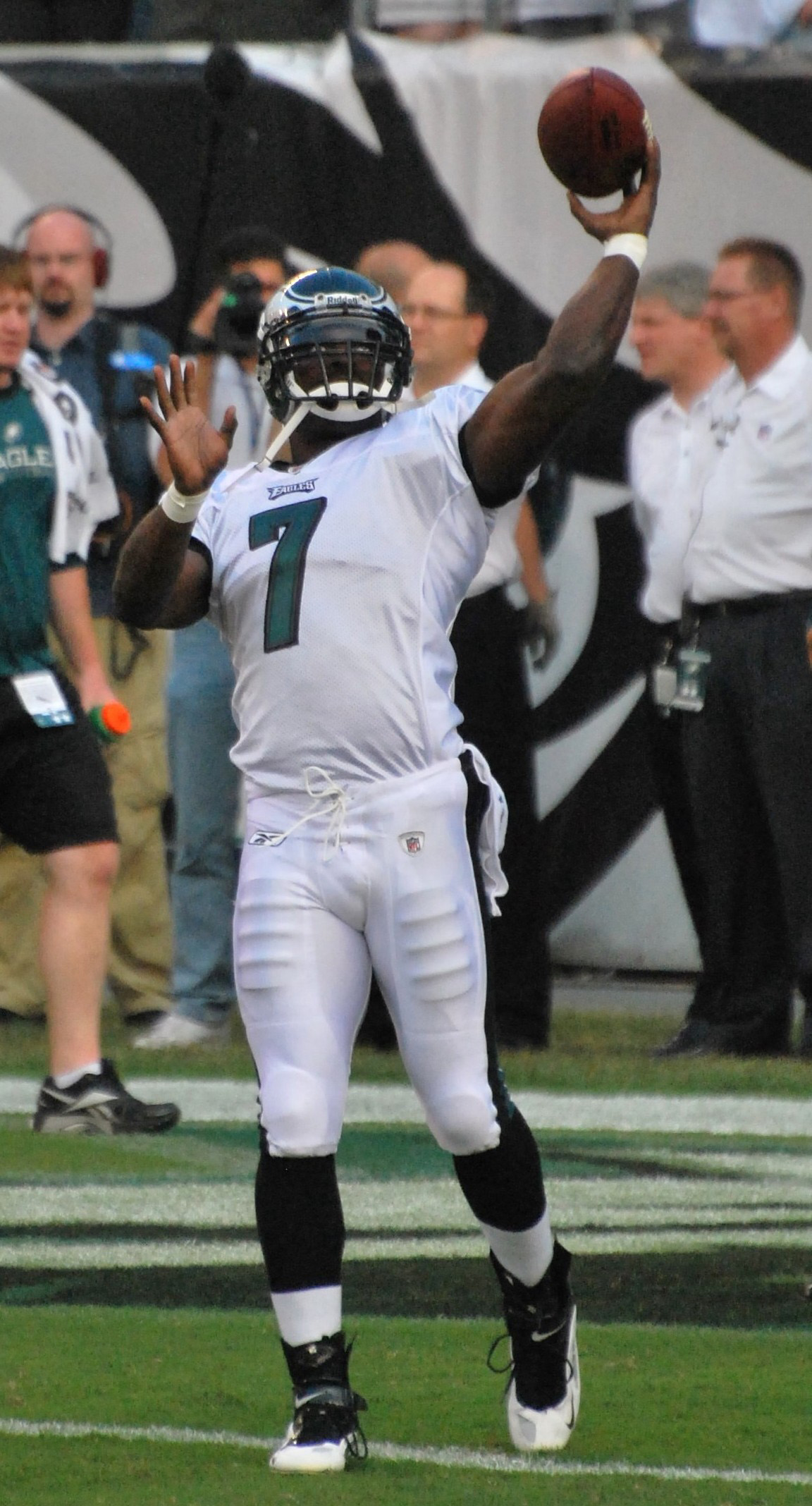
Vick warming up with the Philadelphia Eagles in September 2009

After his release from prison, Vick was mentored by former Indianapolis Colts coach Tony Dungy. The prospect of his return to professional football was the subject of much conjecture as his suspension and incarceration continued. In 2007, ESPN's John Clayton said few general managers were in a strong enough position to consider taking a chance on Vick, and even then most NFL owners would be concerned about a fan and media backlash. There was also no chance of Vick resurrecting his career in the Canadian Football League, he said. Following a furor in 2007 over Ricky Williams playing there while serving a suspension, the CFL banned players currently suspended by the NFL. In any case, Clayton said it would be nearly impossible for a convicted felon to get a Canadian work visa. He did think, however, that Vick would be "unstoppable" if he decided to play in the Arena Football League.

==== 2009 season ====
Vick signed a one-year contract with the Philadelphia Eagles on August 13, 2009. The contract was worth $1.6 million, with no money guaranteed. It contained a team option for the 2010 season worth $5 million. Vick was allowed to participate in all team practices and meetings as well as the Eagles' last two preseason games. He was eligible to play in the third week of the regular season. Starting quarterback Donovan McNabb told reporters he gave coach Andy Reid the idea to sign Vick.

Vick was activated to the 53-man roster in mid-September and played sparingly for the rest of the season as McNabb's backup. In week 13 against the Atlanta Falcons, Vick both threw and ran for a touchdown, his first scores since December 2006. Vick was voted by teammates as the winner of the Ed Block Courage Award in December. The award honors players who "exemplify commitment to the principles of sportsmanship and courage". "It means a great deal to me," Vick said at the time. "I was voted unanimously by my teammates. They know what I've been through. I've been through a lot. It's been great to come back and have an opportunity to play and be with a great group of guys. I'm just ecstatic about that and I enjoy every day." The Eagles finished the season with an 11–5 record, making the playoffs. In the team's NFC Wild Card Round game against the Dallas Cowboys on January 9, 2010, Vick threw the longest touchdown pass of his career to rookie Jeremy Maclin for a 76-yard touchdown. The Eagles lost the game 34–14.

==== 2010 season ====
Reid named Donovan McNabb the Eagles' starter for the 2010 season, but McNabb was traded to the Washington Redskins and Kevin Kolb was named the starter. While relegated to a second-string role, Vick said he knew he could still play at a high level. Asked if he wanted the Eagles to pick up the second year of his contract, he said, "I hope so...I feel like I'm probably better than I ever was in my career, as far as the mental aspect of the game." The Eagles exercised his option for 2010 in March and Vick received a $1.5 million roster bonus.

Reid named Vick the Eagles' starting quarterback on September 21 after Kolb suffered a concussion, and Vick performed well in his stead. In his second game as an Eagles starter versus the Jacksonville Jaguars, Vick led the Eagles to a 28–3 win, throwing for 291 yards and three touchdowns and rushing for another touchdown. He was named the NFC Offensive Player of the Month for September. Vick suffered a rib cartilage injury in a week 4 game against Washington, and was replaced by Kolb. Vick had passed for 49 yards with three carries for 17 yards in the game prior to the injury.

In a Week 10 Monday Night Football matchup against the Washington Redskins on November 14, Vick passed for 333 yards and four touchdowns, while rushing for 80 yards and another two touchdowns. Vick threw an 88-yard touchdown pass to DeSean Jackson on the first play from scrimmage in the game, and went on to help lead the Eagles to a 59–28 victory. Vick was named the NFC Offensive Player of the Week following his performance, and the Pro Football Hall of Fame asked for his game jersey to display after he became the first player to pass for three touchdowns and rush for two touchdowns in the first half of a game. In a game later in the season against the New York Giants, Vick led a fourth-quarter rally to erase a 21-point deficit. He accounted for three touchdowns to tie the game with under two minutes left. DeSean Jackson returned the Giants' last punt of the game for a touchdown to win the game for the Eagles as time expired. Vick earned NFC Offensive Player of the Week for his game against the Giants. Vick finished the season with 3,018 passing yards, 21 touchdowns, and six interceptions with a passer rating of 100.2. He had 100 carries for 676 yards and nine touchdowns. Philadelphia finished with a 10–6 record in 2010 and made the playoffs, but lost to the eventual Super Bowl XLV champion Green Bay Packers 21–16 in the Wild Card Round.

Vick made his fourth Pro Bowl after the season and was named the Eagles' starting quarterback. The Associated Press and Sporting News named him the NFL Comeback Player of the Year. He also won the Bert Bell Award on March 4, 2011. Vick finished second in the NFL Offensive Player of the Year with 11 first place votes and NFL MVP both awarded to Tom Brady who won MVP unanimously. In early 2011, the Eagles placed their franchise tag on Vick. He signed the one-year tender on March 2. On August 29, however, Vick and the Eagles announced they had agreed on a 6-year, $100 million contract with almost $40 million in guaranteed money. Vick was ranked 20th by his fellow players on the NFL Top 100 Players of 2011.

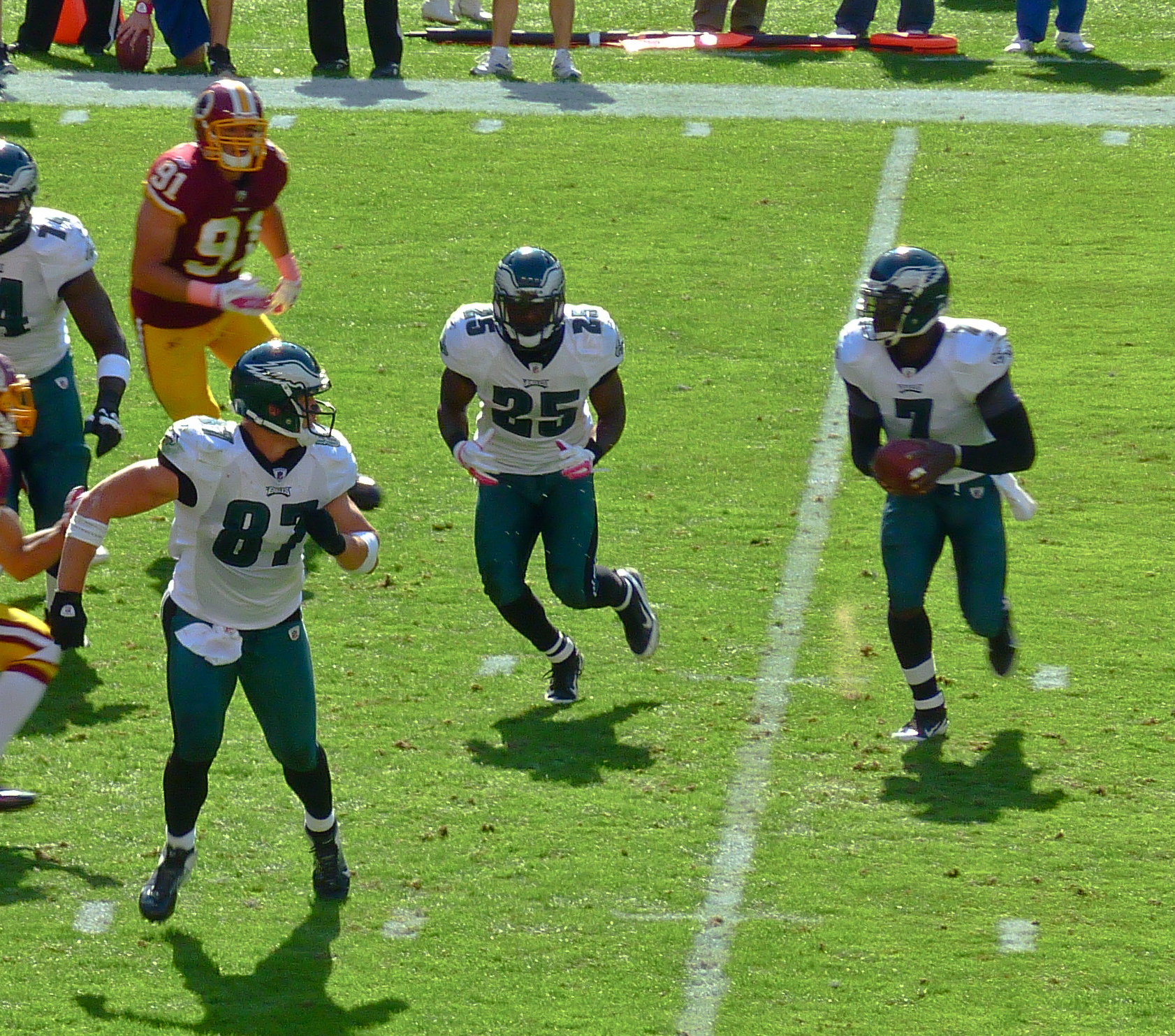
Vick in a game against the Washington Redskins on October 16, 2011

==== 2011 season ====
In Week 4, against the San Francisco 49ers, Vick had 416 passing yards, two passing touchdowns, and one interception to go along with eight carries for 75 rushing yards. The final game of the season was a 34–10 victory on January 1, 2012, at home against Washington. Vick completed 24 of 39 passes for 335 yards and three touchdowns. In the 2011 season, Vick appeared in and started 13 games. He finished with 3,303 passing yards, 18 passing touchdowns, and 14 interceptions to go along with 76 carries for 589 rushing yards and one rushing touchdown. Led by Vick, Philadelphia finished the 2011 season with an 8–8 record. The team began with a 4–8 record before winning four games in a row to finish the season.

==== 2012 season ====
Vick came into week one of the 2012 season as the starter, despite a solid showing from rookie Nick Foles in the preseason. Vick led the Eagles to a 17–16 victory in week one against the Cleveland Browns despite throwing four interceptions. The Eagles won the following game against the Baltimore Ravens, but lost 27–6 in the third week of the season to the Arizona Cardinals. Facing former teammate Kevin Kolb, Vick completed only 17 of 37 passes with no touchdowns and two lost fumbles. The Eagles went on to beat the New York Giants, but then lost three straight games. After the third loss against the Atlanta Falcons on October 28, calls for coach Andy Reid to replace Vick with Foles intensified. Reid refused to make the move.

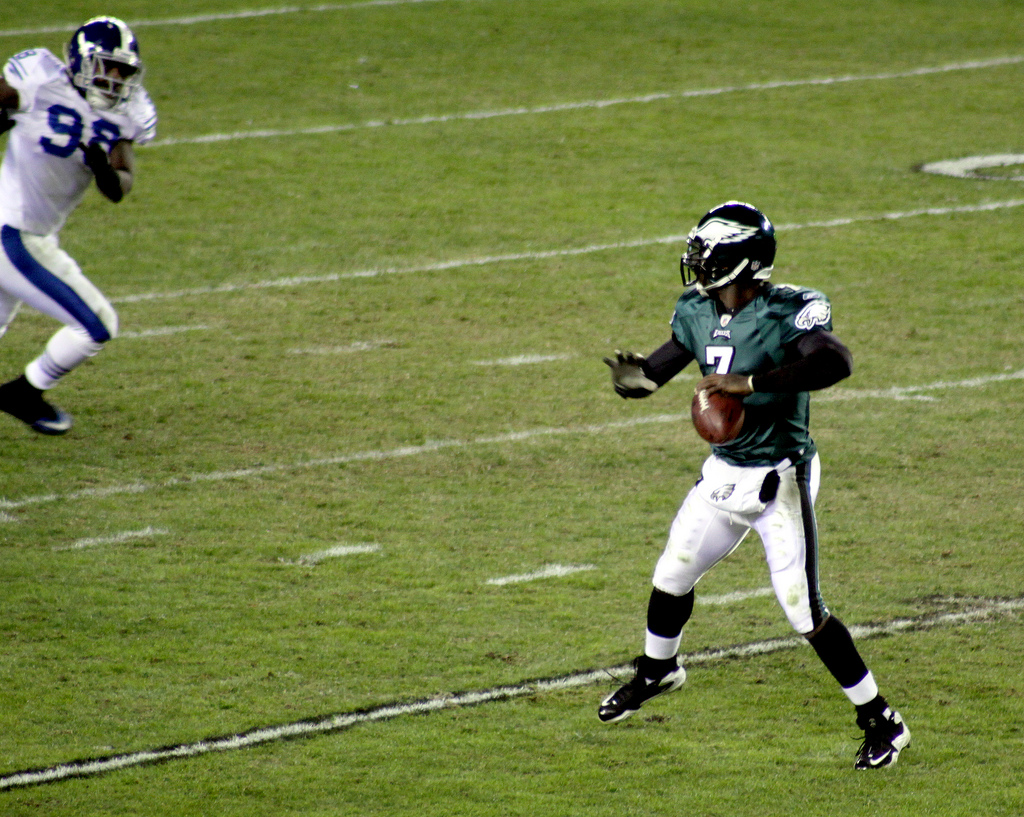
Vick during a 2010 game vs. the Indianapolis Colts

The Eagles lost another game against the New Orleans Saints, and Vick remained the starting quarterback for a week 10 game against the Dallas Cowboys. Vick was injured in that game, which the Eagles lost, and was replaced by Foles. On December 3, after Vick had already been sidelined for three weeks, Reid officially named Foles the starter for the remainder of the season. After a Foles injury in week 16, Vick was named the starter for the season finale against the Giants in New York. Vick went 19 of 35 for 197 yards, a touchdown, and an interception, and also ran five times for 25 yards. The Eagles, however, lost the game 42–7, to end the season with a 1–5 division record and 4–12 overall record.

==== 2013 season ====
On February 11, 2013, the Eagles and Vick agreed on a one-year restructured contract worth up to $10 million. New head coach Chip Kelly announced that Vick, Foles, and rookie Matt Barkley would compete for the starting job. After a stellar preseason, Vick was able to reclaim his starting job from Foles, who was named Vick's backup.

Vick started out well, winning his first game against Washington and throwing his first career 400-yard game in a close loss to the San Diego Chargers, with four passing touchdowns, two rushing touchdowns, and no interceptions in the two-game stretch. After that, Vick suffered losses against the Kansas City Chiefs and Denver Broncos, where he threw for one touchdown and three interceptions in that stretch (all three were thrown against Kansas City). In a game against the New York Giants, Vick was 6 of 14 for 105 yards, when he suffered a hamstring injury. Nick Foles played stellar in his place, going 8–2 as starter, while throwing 27 touchdowns and only two interceptions with a 119.0 passer rating. Vick saw his only playing time in a 15–7 loss to the Giants, where he was 6 of 9 for 30 yards and an interception, but he again suffered an injury, this time to his quadriceps, and was replaced by rookie Matt Barkley, who played even worse. Foles returned the following week, and Vick spent the rest of the season as the backup, making only one more appearance in a blowout win over the Chicago Bears.

=== New York Jets ===
Vick signed a one-year $5 million contract with the New York Jets on March 21, 2014, the same day the Jets released Mark Sanchez. The Eagles signed Sanchez one week later.

Vick chose to wear #8 as a tribute to Steve Young, although several days later he decided to change it to No. 1, as #7 was already taken by Geno Smith. Vick became the first quarterback in franchise history to wear the number. During Week 5 against the San Diego Chargers, Vick came in relief of a struggling Geno Smith following halftime and finished the game with 47 passing yards as the Jets were shut out by the Chargers, 31–0. After seven consecutive losses, Rex Ryan named Vick the starter over Smith for the Week 9 game against the Kansas City Chiefs. Vick became the first quarterback to reach 6,000 rushing yards during Week 10 in a 20–13 win over the Pittsburgh Steelers, which was one of three games that Vick started for the season.

=== Pittsburgh Steelers ===
On August 25, 2015, Vick signed a one-year contract with the Pittsburgh Steelers worth $970,000.

His signing by the Steelers caused a social media backlash by many fans, with some saying that they would never support the team again. Those who supported or were indifferent about the signing called such fans fair weather fans, and also cited that the Steelers have several players with questionable pasts, most notably Ben Roethlisberger and James Harrison. The Animal Rescue League of Western Pennsylvania made a subtle jab at the team on Twitter by saying that they were now more proud to support the Pittsburgh Penguins and subsequently moved an upcoming fundraiser event from Heinz Field to Consol Energy Center. Steelers president Art Rooney II defended the Vick signing on KDKA-TV, saying that they felt that Vick had proven himself since being released from prison. The Steelers had considered signing Vick in 2009—both Vick and Steelers head coach Mike Tomlin are from the same part of Virginia and know each other well personally—but decided against it due to potential backlash since Vick at the time hadn't proven himself following his release from prison.

In Week 3, Vick was brought into action against the St. Louis Rams after Roethlisberger sustained a knee injury that sidelined him for 4–6 weeks. In five weeks, Vick went 40 for 66 with two touchdowns and one interception, also rushing for 99 yards on 20 attempts. Vick suffered a hamstring injury in a win against the Arizona Cardinals and was replaced by Landry Jones. Vick would miss six games, and Roethlisberger eventually returned to his starting role. Vick would be inactive the remainder of the season, leading some sports commentators to speculate that Vick's playing career may be over.

=== Retirement from the NFL ===
In 2016, Vick announced he would play one more season in the NFL. However, after not signing with a team all season, he officially announced his retirement from professional football on February 3, 2017. On June 12, 2017, Vick retired as an Atlanta Falcon.

=== Post-NFL career ===
On June 28, 2017, Vick began participating in the newly formed American Flag Football League, serving as captain of Team Vick. The following year, he captained the Roadrunners, who ultimately lost to Chad Johnson's team in the AFFL semifinal 26–13.

== Career statistics ==
=== NFL ===
Legend
**Bold**	Career high

==== Regular season ====
Year	Team	Games			Passing								Rushing				Sacks		Fumbles (Note: Fumbles lost data taken from Pro Football Reference career game log)	
Year	Team	GP	GS	Record	Cmp	Att	Pct	Yds	Avg	TD	Int	Rtg	Att	Yds	Avg	TD	Sck	SckY	Fum	Lost
2001	ATL	8	2	1–1	50	113	44.2	785	6.9	2	3	62.7	31	289	**9.3**	1	21	113	6	5
2002	ATL	15	15	8–6–1	231	421	54.9	2,936	7.0	16	8	81.6	113	777	6.9	8	33	206	9	4
2003	ATL	5	4	3–1	50	100	50.0	585	5.9	4	3	69.0	40	255	6.4	1	9	64	4	1
2004	ATL	15	15	**11–4**	181	321	56.4	2,313	7.2	14	12	78.1	120	902	7.5	3	**46**	266	**16**	**7**
2005	ATL	15	15	8–7	214	387	55.3	2,412	6.2	15	13	73.1	102	597	5.9	6	33	201	11	5
2006	ATL	**16**	**16**	7–9	204	388	52.6	2,474	6.4	20	13	75.7	**123**	**1,039**	8.4	2	45	**303**	9	3
2007	ATL	Suspended / imprisoned																		
2008	ATL	Suspended / imprisoned																		
2009	PHI	12	1	—	6	13	46.2	86	6.6	1	0	93.7	24	95	4.0	2	0	0	0	0
2010	PHI	12	11	8–3	233	372	**62.6**	3,018	8.1	**21**	6	**100.2**	100	676	6.8	**9**	34	210	11	3
2011	PHI	13	13	7–6	**253**	**423**	59.8	**3,303**	7.8	18	**14**	84.9	76	589	7.8	1	23	126	10	4
2012	PHI	10	10	3–7	204	351	58.1	2,362	6.7	12	10	78.1	62	332	5.4	1	28	153	11	5
2013	PHI	7	6	2–4	77	141	54.6	1,215	**8.6**	5	3	86.5	36	306	8.5	2	15	99	4	2
2014	NYJ	10	3	1–2	64	121	52.9	604	5.0	3	2	68.3	26	153	5.9	0	19	85	5	2
2015	PIT	5	3	2–1	40	66	60.6	371	5.6	2	1	79.8	20	99	5.0	0	10	53	2	0
Career		143	115	61–51–1	1,807	3,217	56.2	22,464	7.0	133	88	80.4	873	6,109	7.0	36	316	1,879	98	41

==== Playoffs ====
Year	Team	Games			Passing								Rushing				Sacks		Fumbles	
Year	Team	GP	GS	Record	Cmp	Att	Pct	Yds	Avg	TD	Int	Rtg	Att	Yds	Avg	TD	Sck	SckY	Fum	Lost
2002	ATL	2	2	1–1	**35**	**63**	55.6	**391**	6.2	1	**2**	66.3	**16**	94	5.9	0	3	27	1	0
2004	ATL	2	2	1–1	23	40	**57.5**	218	5.5	**2**	1	79.0	12	**145**	**12.1**	0	**5**	**47**	**2**	**1**
2008	ATL	Suspended / imprisoned																		
2009	PHI	1	0	—	1	2	50.0	76	**38.0**	1	0	**135.4**	1	0	0.0	0	0	0	1	**1**
2010	PHI	1	1	0–1	20	36	55.6	292	8.1	1	1	79.9	8	32	4.0	**1**	3	21	0	0
2013	PHI	Did not play																		
2015	PIT	Did not play																		
Career		6	5	2–3	79	141	56.0	977	6.9	5	4	77.6	37	271	7.3	1	11	95	4	2

=== College ===
Season	Team	Passing							Rushing			
Season	Team	Cmp	Att	Pct	Yds	TD	Int	Rtg	Att	Yds	Avg	TD
1998	Virginia Tech	Redshirted										
1999	Virginia Tech	90	153	58.8	1,840	12	5	180.4	110	580	5.3	8
2000	Virginia Tech	97	179	54.2	1,439	9	7	127.4	113	636	5.6	9
Career		187	332	56.3	3,279	21	12	153.1	223	1,216	5.5	17

== Awards and honors ==
NFL

- NFL Comeback Player of the Year (2010)
- 4× Pro Bowl (2002, 2004, 2005, 2010)
- Bert Bell Award (2010)

College

- Archie Griffin Award (1999)
- First-team All-American (1999)
- Big East Offensive Player of the Year (1999)
- Big East Rookie of the Year (1999)

== Coaching career ==
=== Early career ===
During their 2017 training camp, Vick joined his former coach Andy Reid as a coaching intern with the Kansas City Chiefs after stating his previous interest in coaching. After the Chiefs concluded their 2017 training camp, he became an NFL analyst on Fox NFL Kickoff on FS1.

=== Atlanta Legends ===
On April 25, 2018, Vick was hired as offensive coordinator for the Atlanta Legends of the Alliance of American Football. Vick said, regarding becoming a coach, "I didn't think I ever wanted to coach but talking about the game at Fox, I get excited like I'm out there playing again. But, it's still not touching individuals. When the opportunity came about, I felt like I could really make a difference and give back to the game. …Once I found out it was in Atlanta, I thought it was a home run." Shortly before the season began, head coach Kevin Coyle announced Vick would no longer serve as offensive coordinator, but would still remain with the team as a consultant.

=== Norfolk State ===
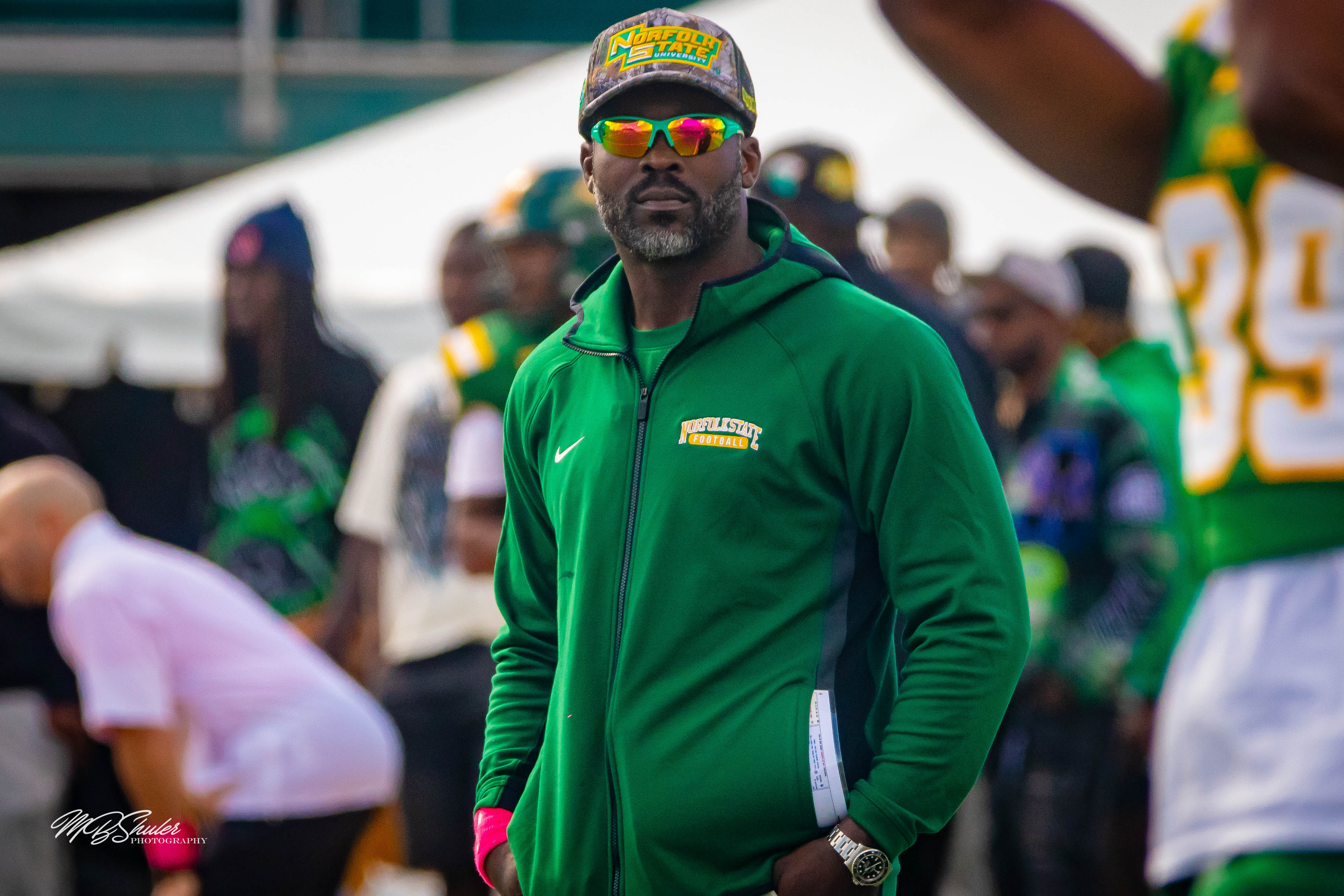
Vick as Norfolk State's head coach in 2025

On December 20, 2024, Vick was named the 19th head football coach at Norfolk State University. In his first season as head coach, Vick and the team finished with a 1–11 record.

== Head coaching record ==
Year	Team	Overall	Conference	Standing	Bowl/playoffs
Norfolk State Spartans (Mid-Eastern Athletic Conference) (2025–present)
2025	Norfolk State	1–11	0–5	6th	
2026	Norfolk State	4–6	0–3		
Norfolk State:		5–17	0–8		
Total:		5–17			

== Legal issues ==
=== Early controversies ===
Between his selection by the Atlanta Falcons in the 2001 NFL draft and early 2007, Vick was allegedly involved in several incidents:

- In early 2004, two men were arrested in Virginia for distributing marijuana. The truck they were driving was registered to Vick. Falcons coach Dan Reeves said he lectured Vick at that time on the importance of reputation, choosing the right friends, and staying out of trouble for the good of his team.
- On October 10, 2004, Vick and other members of his entourage, including employee Quanis Phillips, were at Atlanta's Hartsfield International Airport on their way to board an AirTran flight. While they were passing through a security checkpoint, a security camera caught Phillips and Todd Harris picking up an expensive-appearing watch which belonged to Alvin Spencer, a security screener. After watching the theft on a videotape, Spencer filed a police report. He claimed that Billy "White Shoes" Johnson, known as the Falcons' "fixer", interfered with the investigation. Although Vick's representatives declined to make him available for an Atlanta police inquiry, Spencer got the watch back six days later.
- In March 2005, Sonya Elliott filed a civil lawsuit against Vick alleging she contracted genital herpes from him in the autumn of 2002 and that he failed to inform her that he had the disease. Elliot further alleged that Vick had visited clinics under the alias "Ron Mexico" to get treatments and thus knew of his condition. On April 24, 2006, Vick's attorney, Lawrence Woodward, revealed that the lawsuit had been settled out of court under undisclosed terms. Many fans bought custom jerseys from NFL.com with Vick's #7 and the name "MEXICO" on the back. The NFL later banned customizing jerseys with the name Mexico.
- After a loss to the New Orleans Saints on November 26, 2006, in the Georgia Dome, Vick made an obscene gesture at fans in an apparent reaction to booing, holding up both hands with the middle finger extended. He was fined $10,000 by the NFL and agreed to donate another $10,000 to charity.
- Vick surrendered a water bottle that had a hidden compartment to security personnel at Miami International Airport on January 17, 2007. "The compartment was hidden by the bottle's label so that it appeared to be a full bottle of water when held upright," police said. Test results indicated there were no illegal substances in the water bottle and Vick was cleared of any wrongdoing. Vick announced that the water bottle was a jewelry stash box, and that the substance in question had been jewelry.
- On April 24, 2007, Vick was scheduled to lobby on Capitol Hill, hoping to persuade lawmakers to increase funding for after-school programs. Vick missed a connecting flight in Atlanta on Monday to Reagan National Airport in Arlington, Virginia. He failed to show up for another seat booked for him later that evening. On Tuesday morning, he did not attend his scheduled appearance at a congressional breakfast where he was to be honored for his foundation's work with after-school projects in Georgia and Virginia. Vick's mother, Brenda, accepted the award from the Afterschool Alliance. These events occurred the day before the search warrant on Vick's property which led to Vick's eventual prosecution for dogfighting activities.
- In 2007, Vick's father, Michael Boddie, made statements about possible dogfighting activities in 2001. Boddie told the Atlanta Journal-Constitution that around 2001, Vick was staging dogfights in the garage of the family's home in Newport News and kept fighting dogs in the family's backyard, including injured ones that the father nursed back to health. Boddie said his son had been urged to not engage in the activity, but continued. "This is Mike's thing," he said. "And he knows it." Within days, Vick's mother, Brenda Vick Boddie, told the Newport News Daily Press that "There was no dogfighting. There were no cages."

=== Dog fighting ===
A search warrant executed on April 25, 2007, as part of a drug investigation of Vick's cousin Davon Boddie, led to discovery of evidence of unlawful dog fighting activities at a property owned by Vick in rural Surry County in southeastern Virginia, with extensive facilities for the activity. Media attention quickly grew as state officials investigated, soon joined by federal authorities. As separate state and federal investigations progressed, more details emerged about an interstate dog-fighting ring that involved drugs and gambling. Gruesome details of abuse, torture, and execution of under-performing dogs galvanized animal rights activists and expressions of public outrage. Vick and several others were indicted on federal and Virginia state felony charges related to the operation.

==== Federal prosecution and conviction ====
Speech by Senator Robert Byrd made to U.S. Senate following the indictment of Michael Vick on federal dog fighting charges

In July 2007, Vick and three other men were indicted on federal felony charges of operating an unlawful interstate dog fighting venture known as "Bad Newz Kennels". Vick was accused of financing the operation, directly participating in dog fights and executions, and personally handling thousands of dollars in related gambling activities. Federal prosecutors indicated they intended to proceed under the provisions of the Racketeer Influenced and Corrupt Organizations Act (RICO), a United States federal law that provides for extended criminal penalties and a civil cause of action for acts performed as part of an ongoing criminal organization.

By August 20, Vick and the other three co-defendants agreed to separate plea bargains for the federal charges. They were expected to each receive federal prison sentences of between one and five years. Four days later, Vick filed plea documents with the federal court. He pleaded guilty to "Conspiracy to Travel in Interstate Commerce in Aid of Unlawful Activities and to Sponsor a Dog in an Animal Fighting Venture". Vick admitted to providing most of the financing for the operation, and to participating directly in several dog fights in Virginia, Maryland, North Carolina, and South Carolina. He admitted to sharing in the proceeds from these dog fights. He further admitted that he knew his colleagues killed several dogs who did not perform well. Vick also admitted to taking part in the killings of 6–8 dogs, by hanging, beating, and drowning. The "victimization and killing of pit bulls" was considered an aggravating circumstance, allowing prosecutors to exceed the federal sentencing guidelines for the charge. Vick denied placing any side bets on the dogfights. On August 27, U.S. District Judge Henry E. Hudson accepted Vick's guilty plea, but reminded Vick that he (Hudson) was under no obligation to accept the prosecution's recommendation of a reduced sentence.

While free on bail, Vick tested positive for marijuana in a random drug test. This was a violation of the conditions of his release while awaiting sentencing in federal court. Vick's positive urine sample was submitted on September 13, 2007, according to a document filed by a federal probation officer on September 26. As a result, Hudson ordered Vick confined to his Hampton, Virginia home between 10 p.m. and 6 a.m. with electronic monitoring until his court hearing date in December. He was ordered to submit to random drug testing.

In November, Vick turned himself in early to begin accruing time-served credit against his likely federal prison sentence. He was held at Northern Neck Regional Jail in Warsaw, Virginia awaiting sentencing on the federal convictions. On December 10, Vick appeared in U.S. District Court in Richmond for sentencing. Judge Hudson said he was "convinced that it was not a momentary lack of judgment" on Vick's part, and that Vick was a "full partner" in the dog fighting ring, and he was sentenced to serve 23 months in federal prison. Hudson noted that despite Vick's claim to have accepted responsibility for his actions, his failure to cooperate fully with federal officials, coupled with a failed drug test and a failed polygraph, showed that he had not taken full responsibility for "promoting, funding and facilitating this cruel and inhumane sporting activity". Vick was assigned to Federal Correctional Institution, Leavenworth, to serve his sentence.

At the request of federal authorities before sentencing, Vick agreed to deposit nearly $1 million in an escrow account with attorneys to reimburse others for the costs of caring for the confiscated dogs, most of which were being offered for adoption on a selective basis under supervision of a court-appointed specialist. Experts said some of the animals would require special care for the rest of their lives. During the administration of his bankruptcy case, the U.S. Department of Labor complained that these funds were paid at least partially with unlawfully withdrawn monies that Vick held in trust for himself and eight other employees of MV7, a celebrity marketing company he owned.

==== State prosecution and sentencing ====
Separate Virginia charges against all four defendants in the dog-fighting case were brought following indictments by the Surry County grand jury when it met on September 25, 2007. The principal evidence considered was sworn statements of the defendants during their plea agreement process before the federal court. Vick was charged with two class-6 felonies, which each carried a maximum penalty of five years' imprisonment.

Citing the high costs and transportation logistics of proceeding while Vick was still in federal prison, state prosecutor Gerald Poindexter decided to postpone Vick's trial in Surry County Circuit Court until after Vick's release from federal custody. Vick's attorneys sought to resolve the state charges sooner. On October 14, 2008, Vick's attorney Lawrence Woodward filed a motion to enter a plea via two-way electronic video with the Surry County Courts. Vick planned to plead guilty to state charges in an effort to get early release from federal prison and enter a halfway house. The request for a trial without Vick physically present was denied, but Poindexter agreed to hold the state trial while Vick was still in federal custody if Vick bore the costs of his transportation to Virginia and related expenses.

Vick was transported to Virginia in November 2008 to face the state charges. He appeared before the Surry County Circuit Court on November 25 at a session held in neighboring Sussex County because the Surry court building was undergoing renovation. He submitted a guilty plea to a single Virginia felony charge for dog fighting, receiving a 3-year prison sentence suspended on condition of good behavior, and a $2,500 fine. In return for the plea agreement, the other charge was dropped. Michael Dwayne Vick, Federal Bureau of Prisons (BOP) ID# 33765-183, was released on July 20, 2009.

==== Political activity ====
In 2011, Vick lobbied for H.R. 2492, the Animal Fighting Spectator Prohibition Act, which would have established federal misdemeanor penalties for spectators of illegal animal fighting and made it a felony for adults to bring children to fights.

== Financial troubles ==
At the end of 2006, Sports Illustrated magazine estimated Vick's annual income between his NFL salary and endorsements at $25.4 million, ranking him just below NASCAR's Dale Earnhardt Jr. in a listing of highest-earning athletes. Vick's finances suffered, however, from poor management, bad investments and lawsuits. Certified Financial Planner Michael Smith advised Vick from 2003 to 2005, but resigned after Vick took bad advice from friends, made ill-conceived investments, overspent, and otherwise undermined the wealth-building plan that Smith had created. Smith's plan was for Vick to have a net wealth of $100 million by 2010; by that date Vick was actually an estimated $18.97 million in debt.

In 2006, a $45 million lawsuit was pending in a dispute with Vick's original sports agents. Several lucrative endorsement deals soured.

After the dog fighting indictments were announced in July 2007, financial claims against Vick escalated. His financial affairs strained, Vick was unable to meet scheduled payments and other obligations. Within several months, he had been named in numerous lawsuits by banks and creditors for defaulting on loans, some of them related to business investments. The dog fighting property near Smithfield, Virginia, had been liquidated earlier, and in November 2007, Vick attempted to sell another of his homes.

In June 2008, when Vick's brother, Marcus, was arrested and jailed in Norfolk after a police chase, he listed his residence as a $1.39 million home owned by Vick in an exclusive riverfront community in Suffolk, Virginia. Construction of a new riverfront home took place on land Vick owned in another exclusive section of Suffolk. His attorneys later estimated that he was spending $30,000 a month to support seven friends and relatives, including his mother and brother, three children, and their mothers.

=== Bankruptcy ===
On July 7, 2008, Vick sought Chapter 11 bankruptcy protection in U.S. Bankruptcy Court in Newport News after failing to "work out consensual resolutions with each of his creditors," according to court papers. The initial filing, which was incomplete, listed assets of less than $50 million and debts of between $10 million and $50 million. The seven largest creditors without collateral backing their claims were owed a total of $12.8 million. The three biggest unsecured creditors were Joel Enterprises Inc., owed $4.5 million for breach of contract; Atlanta Falcons, owed $3.75 million for a pro-rated signing bonus; and Royal Bank of Canada, owed $2.5 million in loans.

==== Major financial obligations ====
Joel Enterprises of Richmond was listed as one of Vick's larger creditors. Sports agents Andrew Joel and Dave Lowman claimed Vick signed a contract with their firm in 2001, nine days before he announced he was leaving Virginia Tech early and declaring himself eligible for the NFL Draft. With his mother as a witness, Vick signed a five-year marketing agreement that anticipated a wide range of endorsement activities using Vick's name, likeness, voice, and reputation. Joel's cut was 25% of all deals, excluding Vick's NFL contract, according to the agreement. Vick attempted to end the relationship with Joel Enterprises a few weeks later, and entered into another relationship with other agents. In 2005, Joel Enterprises sued Vick in Richmond Circuit Court for $45 million in compensatory and punitive damages for breach of contract. After the Virginia Supreme Court denied a Vick motion and ruled that the civil trial could proceed in December 2006, the parties agreed to submit the dispute to binding arbitration for resolution instead of a formal civil court trial. The outcome of the case was an award of $4.5 million to Joel.

The Atlanta Falcons sought to recover a portion of Vick's $37 million 2004 signing bonus. A reduced amount of $20 million was awarded to the Falcons in binding legal arbitration, which Vick disputed. The sides agreed to reduce the amount to between $6.5 and $7.5 million. The bankruptcy court was advised of this Vick-Falcons settlement agreement on April 3, 2009.

On September 20, 2007, the Royal Bank of Canada filed a civil lawsuit in the U.S. District Court in Newport News against Vick for more than $2.3 million over a loan tied to real estate. The suit claimed Vick failed to meet a September 10 deadline to repay. On May 7, 2008, the court granted a motion for summary judgment against Vick for default and breach of a promissory note and ordered him to pay the bank more than $2.5 million.

On September 26, 2007, 1st Source Bank, based in South Bend, Indiana, claimed damages of at least $2 million in a federal lawsuit, alleging Vick and Divine Seven LLC of Atlanta refused to pay for at least 130 vehicles acquired to be used as rental cars. The bank's Specialty Financing Group provided financing for rental car fleets.

Wachovia Bank also filed a federal suit in October 2007 in Atlanta seeking about $940,000 from Vick and Gerald Frank Jenkins, a business partner. The bank claimed the two men and their business, Atlantic Wine & Package LLC, defaulted on a May 2006 loan of $1.3 million to set up a wine shop and restaurant. Jenkins, a retired surgeon who owned Atlantic Wine since 2004, brought Vick in as an investor. In May 2008, the U.S. District Court in Atlanta granted a summary judgment in favor of Wachovia. The judgment of $1.11 million included the initial principal balance, interest accrued, fees, overdrawn accounts, and legal fees. The order provided that further interest could be accrued.

The United States Department of Labor filed another lawsuit in federal district court in Newport News on March 25, 2009, alleging Vick and others violated federal employee benefits laws by withdrawing $1.35 million from a retirement plan sponsored by MV7, one of Vick's companies. The money was held in trust under pension laws to fund retirement plans for nine MV7 employees. The Labor Department simultaneously filed a complaint in federal bankruptcy court to prevent Vick from discharging his alleged debt to the MV7 pension plan. The complaint alleged that some of the funds were used to pay restitution ordered in his dogfighting case.

==== Early proceedings ====
In August 2008, trustee W. Clarkson McDow Jr. was appointed to manage Vick's bankruptcy. The trustee noted in court documents that Vick "has limited ability to arrange his finances and limited ability to participate in the bankruptcy case on an in-person basis." McDow wrote in court documents that it appeared Vick had "routinely relied upon others to make financial decisions for him, giving them discretionary control over large sums of money". McDow named Mary Wong and David A. Talbot as people who had obtained broad written authority to act as his attorney-in-fact over all of his financial affairs.

Vick had hired Wong, a business manager in Omaha, Nebraska, in the fall of 2007 on the recommendation of Falcons teammate Demorrio Williams. Wong helped cash in some of Vick's investments to provide restitution funds required by the federal court in his criminal case. According to a document filed by one of Vick's attorneys, she used a power of attorney from Vick to "wrongfully remove" at least another $900,000 from his various accounts. Court papers also alleged Wong "caused certain business entities owned by [Vick] to be transferred to her." Vick learned later that Wong had been permanently barred from working with any firm that traded on the New York Stock Exchange as the result of taking more than $150,000 from two elderly widows she met while working at Wells Fargo.

Vick next turned to Talbot, a medical school graduate from Hackensack, New Jersey who claimed to have expertise in financial management. Vick later told the court he met Talbot in April 2008 through his brother, Marcus. Talbot was to be paid $15,000 per month and took possession of one of Vick's cars, an $85,000 Mercedes-Benz. Vick later discovered that Talbot's résumé contained numerous false statements. Talbot had been accused of defrauding church members in New Jersey. The New Jersey Attorney General started legal action against Talbot for securities fraud over an alleged scheme to defraud investors of more than $500,000 by offering them "asset enhancement contracts" to be used to build a new church. U.S. bankruptcy Judge Frank Santoro ordered that the Mercedes-Benz Vick gave Talbot be repossessed and sold, and that Talbot appear at a hearing on September 5.

Paul K. Campsen, one of Vick's lawyers, told the court that Vick "has supported his mother, brother, fiancée and his two children" over the years. He said Vick's financial problems included average monthly expenses of $12,225 for several large homes his family and friends were living in and a monthly income of just $277.69.

==== Reorganization plan ====
Vick's attorneys filed a first plan of reorganization through bankruptcy on November 12, 2008. Under the plan, Vick was to sell three of his six homes. Vick's expenses, meanwhile, included support payments of approximately $30,000 a month. They included $14,531 a month to his mother, $12,363 a month to his fiancée and two daughters, and $3,500 a month to his former girlfriend Tameka Taylor, with whom he had a child. Creditors challenged Vick's spending plan given his loss of salary and suspension from the NFL. Vick's attorneys told the judge on November 13 that Vick "has every reason to believe that upon his release, he will be reinstated into the NFL, resume his career and be able to earn a substantial living."

After creditors objected to the initial reorganization plan, Vick appeared in person before Santoro at a hearing in Newport News on April 2, 2009. Santoro had decided not to allow testimony by video in March, saying he needed Vick in the courtroom to assess his demeanor and credibility. Vick testified that he intended to live a better life after prison. He said his crime was "heinous" and felt "true remorse". Near the end of the hearing, Santoro rejected the plan as unsound, saying that it was too strongly predicated on Vick's return to the NFL and the substantial projected income it would bring, neither of which was assured.

The judge commended Vick for trying to work out his financial mess after years of poor choices, but told Vick the numbers did not add up. Santoro adjourned the case and told Vick to work with his advisers to create a new plan, suggesting Vick begin by liquidating one or both of his Virginia homes, as well as three of the cars he intended to keep, and "buy a house more within his means." Vick had testified that he felt obligated to provide for friends and family because of "where he had come from." Santoro told Vick that while that was commendable, "You cannot be everything to everybody. If you do, you're going to be nothing to anybody."

On April 28, attorneys met with Santoro and said they made substantial progress on a revised plan. They reported having settled all disputes with Vick's creditors, including Joel. On August 27, Santoro approved the revised reorganization plan. It was supported by all of Vick's creditors but one who was owed $13,000. Every creditor was to be paid back in six years on the condition that an estimated $9 million in assets be liquidated. Vick was allowed annual living expenses of $300,000 under the plan. He could spend up to $3,500 a month for rent in Philadelphia and $750 for "utilities and miscellaneous". He was to pay $3,712 a month on the mortgage for his house in Hampton, Virginia, where his fiancée and two children lived, and could pay up to $1,355 per month in private school tuition for his children. Vick was also given up to $472 a month in car-related expenses. His mother was allowed $2,500 per month, and his former girlfriend Tameka Taylor was allotted $3,000 per month to support their son, Mitez. Vick was not required to pay creditors during his first season with the Eagles. Vick paid his agent, Joel Segal, $32,500 in 2010, $104,000 in 2011, and would pay him $160,000 each year from 2012 to 2015 for a total of $776,500. He paid bankruptcy lawyers $748,750 in 2010, $1 million in 2011, and a total of $2.6 million.

== Endorsements ==
During his career with the Falcons, Vick became a spokesperson for many companies. He had endorsement contracts with companies including Nike, EA Sports, Coca-Cola, Powerade, Kraft, Rawlings, Hasbro, and AirTran.

Even before the animal cruelty case surfaced in 2007, however, Vick's corporate status had deteriorated. Among the negative incidents was his middle finger gesture to Atlanta football fans in 2006. Vick's first endorsement after being released from prison was a two-year deal on January 27, 2011, with Unequal Technologies, a company that produces football pads. Nike officially signed Vick again as an athlete on July 1, 2011. The company had been supplying him with complimentary gear since October 2009; his re-signing marked the first time a sponsor had brought back an athlete after dropping him.

In 2012, Vick launched a sports clothing line called V7 to be sold exclusively at Modell's. Part of the proceeds was to go to the Boys and Girls Club of Philadelphia.

== Charitable foundations ==
Vick has been a principal in two charitable foundations, the Michael Vick Foundation and The Vick Foundation. In June 2006, Vick, along with his brother Marcus and mother Brenda, established The Vick Foundation, a nonprofit organization to support at-risk youth with after-school programs in the Metro Atlanta and Hampton Roads areas. The announcement of the new organization came just before the start of the foundation's first fundraiser, the Michael Vick Golf Classic. The inaugural event was held at the prestigious Kingsmill Golf Course in James City County near Williamsburg, Virginia in partnership with The Virginia Tech Alumni Association Tidewater Chapter, and raised more than $80,000 for charity. According to its 2006 federal tax return, the Michael Vick Foundation provided 100 backpacks to poor children in Newport News and paid for an after-school program.

After the Virginia Tech massacre on April 16, 2007, Vick and the United Way donated $10,000 to assist families affected. The Vick Foundation collected donations from communities in Atlanta and Virginia to be placed in the United In Caring Fund for Victims of the Virginia Tech Tragedy and a special fund at the United Way of Montgomery, Radford, and Floyd counties, which serves the Virginia Tech area. The Vick Foundation said the money would be used to provide help with funeral expenses, transportation for family members and other support services.

== See also ==
- List of NCAA major college football yearly passing leaders
- Dual-threat quarterback
- Racial issues faced by black quarterbacks
- List of left-handed quarterbacks
