= Denbigh High School (Newport News, Virginia) =

Location
- 259 Denbigh Boulevard; Newport News, Virginia 23608; United States; 37°07′34″N 76°32′53″W

Information
- School type: Public high school
- Founded: 1966
- School district: Newport News Public Schools
- Superintendent: George Parker, III
- Director: Dr. Aaron Smith (Aviation Academy)
- Principal: Dr. Adria Strothers
- Teaching staff: 99.93 (FTE)
- Grades: 9–12
- Enrollment: 1,380 (2017–18)
- Student to teacher ratio: 13.81
- Language: English
- Campus: Suburban
- Colors: Red, white, and blue
- Athletics conference: Virginia High School League; Peninsula District; Eastern Region
- Mascot: Patriot
- Rival: Woodside High School; Menchville High School
- Feeder schools: Passage Middle School; Ella Fitzgerald Middle School
- Website: http://denbigh.nn.k12.va.us https://avi.nn.k12.va.us Aviation Academy

Denbigh High School is a high school in Newport News, Virginia. It is a part of Newport News Public Schools.

Denbigh carries grades nine through twelve and has an enrollment of approximately 1,500 students. This school was rated "Fully Accredited" by the Virginia Department of Education for the 2005–2006 school year. Denbigh is the only host of the Aviation program in Newport News Public Schools.

Denbigh High School is represented by its mascot, the Patriot. Recently the known mascot picture of the Patriot was changed to a star with 'Patriots' across it. Rumors of possibly changing from the 'Patriots' and adopting a different mascot have been circulating, but nothing has been confirmed. Their colors are red, white, and blue. It also has the lowest-rated sports teams throughout the region. This school was opened in the fall of 1965 with grades 8-11, and the Junior class of that year became the first Senior class the following year. The class of 1970 was the first to go through all five years at Denbigh. For a time, Newport News had 5-year high schools, and Denbigh (the northernmost of the city's high schools) had 8-12th grades. The class of 1968 presented, as a memorial, a step from the first Denbigh school.

The Denbigh area of Newport News is named for the market town and community in Denbighshire, Wales.

Denbigh is also one of two sites in Newport News that hosts SAT testing and ACT testing.

Newport News Public Schools has a Telecommunications Program, which allows students at Denbigh High Schools and other schools within the division to participate in live television production. These students can gain experience reporting, producing, recording, and editing for live productions such as local sporting events. Additionally, Denbigh's choral and band programs are award-winning in local, regional, state, and national competitions.

== Demographics ==
Category	Enrollment	Percentage
Total Enrollment	1560	100%
Gender
Male	782	59.4%
Female	535	40.6%
Ethnicity
Native American	22	1.4%
Asian/Pacific Islander	74	4.7%
Black	842	54.0%
Hispanic	137	8.8%
White	485	31.1%
European	19	1.4%
Special Education	161	10.3%
Talented and Gifted	117	7.5%
Economically Disadvantaged	527	33.8%

== Notable alumni ==
- Antoine Bethea, former NFL safety
- Gordon Brown, former NFL running back
- DeWayne Craddock, 2019 Virginia Beach mass shooter who killed 12 people before killing himself
- Robert Cray, renowned blues guitarist
- Dwayne Hollis, professional football defensive back
- Siani Lee, former news anchor and reporter
- Chris Peace, former NFL defensive end
- Les Smith, former WAVY-TV and WTKR news anchor
- Mike Tomlin, head coach of the Pittsburgh Steelers of the NFL (2007–2025)
- Tony Vinson, former NFL and NFL Europa running back
- Joseph Wooten, keyboardist and backing vocalist for the Steve Miller Band
- Roy "Future Man" Wooten, five-time Grammy Award-winning jazz drummer and instrument inventor
- Victor Wooten, renowned bass guitarist and five-time Grammy Award winner
- Max Yates, former NFL linebacker

== Notable staff ==
- Tommy Reamon, former head football coach and NFL running back
