= VHSL Group 5A South Region =

- Abbreviation: Group 5A South
- Formation: 2013
- Purpose: Athletic/Educational
- Region served: Virginia
- Members: 28 public high schools
- Official language: English
- Affiliations: National Federation of State High School Associations
- Website: vhsl.org

The Group 5A South Region is a division of the Virginia High School League. Along with the 5A North Region, it consists of the second largest high schools in Virginia in terms of population. The region was formed in 2013 when the VHSL adopted a six classification format and eliminated the previous three classification system. For the purpose of regular season competition, schools compete within districts that existed prior to 2013, while post-season competition will be organized within four conferences that make up each region.

== Conferences for 2013–14 and 2014–15 ==
=== Atlantic Conference 9 ===
- Green Run High School of Virginia Beach
- Floyd E. Kellam High School of Virginia Beach
- Kempsville High School of Virginia Beach
- Princess Anne High School of Virginia Beach
- Salem High School of Virginia Beach
- Maury High School of Norfolk
- Norview High School of Norfolk

=== PenSouth Conference 10 ===
- Gloucester High School of Gloucester
- Hampton High School of Hampton
- Menchville High School of Newport News
- Warwick High School of Newport News
- Great Bridge High School of Chesapeake
- Hickory High School of Chesapeake
- Indian River High School of Chesapeake

=== Conference 11 ===
- Atlee High School of Mechanicsville
- Henrico High School of Henrico
- Highland Springs High School of Highland Springs
- Mechanicsville High School of Mechanicsville
- Deep Run High School of Glen Allen
- Douglas S. Freeman High School of Henrico
- Mills E. Godwin High School of Henrico
- Hermitage High School of Henrico

=== Conference 12 ===
- Matoaca High School of Chesterfield
- Meadowbrook High School of Chesterfield
- Prince George High School of Prince George
- L. C. Bird High School of Chesterfield
- Clover Hill High School of Midlothian
- Manchester High School of Midlothian
