= Hilton Elementary School =

Hilton Elementary School may refer to:

- Hilton Elementary School (Newport News, Virginia)
- Hilton Elementary School, Baltimore, Maryland, a school in the Baltimore City Public Schools
