= Curt Newsome =

American football coach (1958–2026)

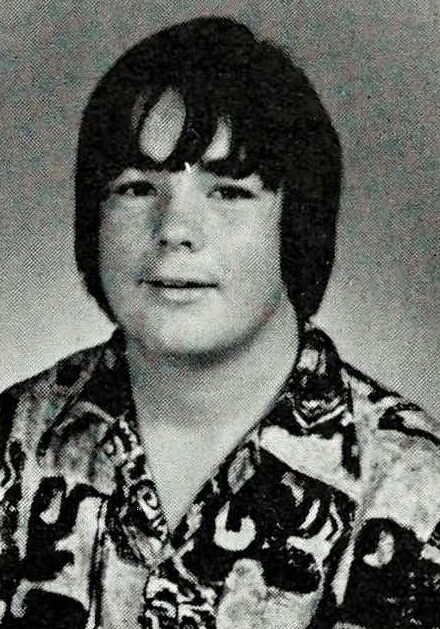
- Newsome in 1976

Biographical details
- Born: October 29, 1958; Hampton, Virginia, U.S.
- Died: May 2026 (aged 67)
- Education: Emory and Henry College (1982)

Playing career
- 1978–1981: Emory & Henry
- Position: Defensive tackle

Coaching career (HC unless noted)
- 1982: Ervinton HS (VA) (assistant)
- 1983–1986: Ervinton HS (VA)
- 1987–1997: Kecoughtan HS (VA)
- 1998: Heritage HS (VA)
- 1999–2001: James Madison (DL)
- 2002: James Madison (TE/OT)
- 2003–2005: James Madison (AHC/OL)
- 2006–2010: Virginia Tech (OL)
- 2011–2012: Virginia Tech (OG/C)
- 2013: James Madison (AHC/OL)
- 2014–2023: Emory & Henry

Head coaching record
- Overall: 53–42 (college)

Accomplishments and honors

Championships
- 1 ODAC (2014)

Curtis Wayne Newsome Jr. (October 29, 1958 – May 2026) was an American football coach. He was the head football coach for Emory & Henry College from 2014 to 2023. He previously coached for Ervinton High School, Kecoughtan High School, Heritage High School, James Madison, and Virginia Tech. He played college football as a defensive tackle for the Emory & Henry Wasps.

Newsome died in May 2026, at the age of 67.

== Head coaching record ==
=== College ===
Year	Team	Overall	Conference	Standing	Bowl/playoffs
Emory & Henry Wasps (Old Dominion Athletic Conference) (2014–2020)
2014	Emory & Henry	8–2	5–2	T–1st	
2015	Emory & Henry	6–4	4–3	T–3rd	
2016	Emory & Henry	6–4	5–2	T–2nd	
2017	Emory & Henry	3–7	1–5	T–6th	
2018	Emory & Henry	4–5	3–4	T–4th	
2019	Emory & Henry	7–3	6–2	3rd	
2020–21	Emory & Henry	3–1	3–0	2nd	
Emory & Henry Wasps (NCAA Division II independent) (2021)
2021	Emory & Henry	6–4			
Emory & Henry Wasps (South Atlantic Conference) (2022–2023)
2022	Emory & Henry	5–6	4–5	4th (Mountain)	
2023	Emory & Henry	5–6	3–5	4th (Mountain)	
Emory & Henry:		53–42	34–28		
Total:		53–42			
National championship Conference title Conference division title or championship game berth
