= Heritage High School (Newport News, Virginia) =

Public school in Virginia, United States

Location
- 5800 Marshall Avenue; Newport News, Virginia 23605; United States; 37°0′22″N 76°25′38″W

Information
- School type: Public high school
- Founded: 1996
- School district: Newport News Public Schools
- Superintendent: George Parker, III
- Director: Lenise Cowling (S.T.E.M. and University Magnet)
- Principal: Diron Ford
- Teaching staff: 78.55 (FTE)
- Grades: 9–12
- Enrollment: 1,168 (2021-22)
- Student to teacher ratio: 14.87
- Language: English
- Campus: Urban
- Colors: Maroon; Silver
- Athletics conference: Virginia High School League; Peninsula District; Eastern Region
- Mascot: Hurricanes
- Rivals: Warwick High School; Woodside High School
- Feeder schools: Crittenden Middle School; Huntington Middle School
- Website: http://heritage.nn.k12.va.us

Heritage High School, established in 1996, is a public school in Newport News, Virginia. The school is home to the Heritage Hurricanes, and its colors are maroon and silver. The school is also home to the Newport News Public Schools Science, Technology, Engineering, and Mathematics (STEM) magnet program, as well as the University magnet program. The school is located in the South East End area of the city (Downtown) at 5800 Marshall Avenue. The current principal is Earling Hunter. The school has a twin school, Woodside High School, that was built simultaneously and designed by the same architects.

== 2021 shooting ==
On September 20, 2021, a shooting occurred at the school, injuring two people. The shooter, 15-year-old Jacari Taylor, was arrested and has since pleaded guilty to malicious wounding and four gun charges. Taylor, who showed remorse for his actions, was ultimately sentenced to 10 years for the shooting.

== Demographics ==
As of October 2009

Category	Enrollment	Percentage
Total Enrollment	1495	100%
Gender
Male	697	46.6%
Female	798	53.4%
Ethnicity
Native American	7	0.5%
Asian/Pacific Islander	8	0.5%
Black	1311	87.7%
Hispanic	34	2.3%
White	131	8.8%
Unspecified	4	0.3%
Special Education	178	11.9%
Talented and Gifted	56	3.7%
Economically Disadvantaged	772	51.6%

== Athletics ==
The Hurricanes compete in the Peninsula Region, Division 4A.

In 2000, The Heritage football team won the Virginia state championship with a 14-0 overall record. In 2008, the girls basketball team also won the Virginia state title, defeating Forest Park.

== Notable alumni ==
- Khalid Abdullah, NFL Player
- Darryl Blackstock, NFL Player
- Trinity Tatum, winner of the eighth season of Love Island USA
