= Marcus Vick =

American football player (born 1984)

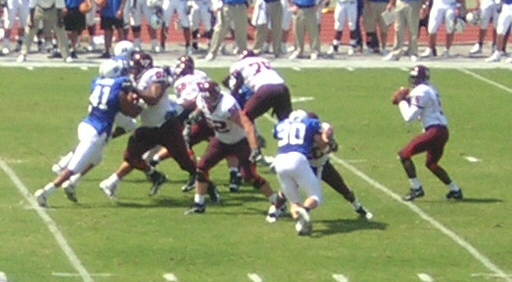
- Vick (far right) with Virginia Tech in 2005

No. 5
- Position: Quarterback

Personal information
- Born: March 20, 1984 (age 42); Newport News, Virginia, U.S.
- Listed height: 6 ft 0 in (1.83 m)
- Listed weight: 216 lb (98 kg)

Career information
- High school: Warwick (Newport News)
- College: Virginia Tech (2002-2005)
- NFL draft: 2006: undrafted

Career history
- Miami Dolphins (2006)

Awards and highlights
- First-team All-ACC (2005); Paul Torgersen Award (2002)

Career NFL statistics
- Games played: 1
- Stats at Pro Football Reference

Marcus Deon Vick (born March 20, 1984) is an American former football quarterback. He played college football for the Virginia Tech Hokies, earning first-team All-ACC honors in 2005, but was dismissed after the season due to several legal infractions and unsportsmanlike play. Marcus joined the Miami Dolphins of the National Football League (NFL) in 2006 as an undrafted free agent, appearing in only one game before he was released. Since the end of his playing career, he has continued to face various legal troubles.

== Early life ==
Marcus Deon Vick was born to Brenda Vick and Michael Boddie on March 20, 1984, in Newport News, Virginia. His parents married approximately two years later, by which time they had four children, Christina (Marcus' older sister), Michael (Marcus' older brother), Courtney, and Marcus. Although their parents had wed, the children decided to continue using their mother's surname.

Vick grew up in Ridley Circle, a public housing project in the crime-ridden East End neighborhood of Newport News. During his younger years, his father traveled for work a lot and his mother worked relatively low wage service jobs, including driving a school bus and working at K-Mart.

Vick attended Warwick High School. At Warwick, he was coached by Tommy Reamon, a former collegiate and professional football player who had been instrumental in the development of future NFL quarterbacks Aaron Brooks (his older cousin) and Marcus' brother, Michael.

== College career ==
=== Recruitment to Virginia Tech ===
Heading into his senior year of high school, Vick was one of the country's top quarterback prospects. Although his brother had taken Virginia Tech in Blacksburg, Virginia within one game of a national championship and despite Michael's close relationship with Virginia Tech coach Frank Beamer, Marcus did not seem sold on attending Tech.

North Carolina State, Virginia, Tennessee, and Miami all had scholarship offers on the table. Marcus was seriously considering NC State and Virginia Tech. By September, it was clear that Marcus was considering several schools, mostly because of concerns about the Hokies' scheme and its ability to prepare him for the NFL.

=== 2002–2003 ===
While Vick arrived at Tech with great fanfare, he did not play as a true freshman. Beamer redshirted him, and he was a member of the dress squad for every game. Vick threw five touchdown (TD) passes during spring scrimmages and added another in the Maroon-White game. He was 6-for-7 passing for 95 yards and one touchdown during one scrimmage, and turned in a 57-yard run in another scrimmage. He hit 10-of-15 passes for 92 yards and a touchdown in the Maroon-White game. For performances such as these, he was awarded the Paul Torgersen Award for the top offensive newcomer.

In 2003, Vick played in seven games, splitting time with Bryan Randall. The highlight of his season came during a 31–7 upset win over #2 Miami. Despite completing only one pass, Vick's exceptional running ability and the outstanding play of Tech's defense contributed to one of the biggest wins in the history of Virginia Tech football. In Virginia Tech's loss in the Insight Bowl to the California Golden Bears, Vick racked up 82 receiving yards, including one touchdown reception.

=== 2004 ===
Prior to the 2004 collegiate season, Vick had several run-ins with the law which resulted in misdemeanor convictions. According to an article in The Washington Post, the convictions triggered a review by Virginia Tech Athletic Director Jim Weaver under the school's Comprehensive Action Plan, which was put in place in 1997 after 22 arrests involving 19 football players during a 15-month period.

Following an incident which occurred on January 27, 2004, he was arrested and accused of having sexual relations with a 15-year-old girl. The age of consent in Virginia is 18. With the others, he was also charged with unlawfully providing alcohol to three underage girls who "claimed" to be college students.

An eight-hour-long trial was held in Montgomery County Juvenile and Domestic Relations Court. According to a report in the Washington Post, "one of the girls wept as she recounted how she and two friends met the players at a Tech women's basketball game Jan. 27 and, after sneaking out of a house during a slumber party, went in Vick's sport utility vehicle to the apartment Vick and Hill share." The newspaper also reported "another girl testified that she told the players she was 18, three years older than her actual age." Although Vick had confessed to police that he had consensual sex with one of the girls that night, during the hearing, the girl refused to answer questions from defense lawyers, invoking her Fifth Amendment right against self-incrimination.

Juvenile and Domestic Judge Robert C. Viar Jr. dismissed the sex charge against Vick. However, he was convicted of all three counts of contributing to the delinquency of a minor, sentenced to 30 days in jail and fined $2,150. On the same day, two of Vick's teammates also were convicted of three counts each of contributing to the delinquency of a minor. Hokies tailback Mike Imoh, 19, was sentenced to 10 days in jail and fined $750. Wide receiver Brenden Hill, 19, was sentenced to 20 days in jail and fined $1,500.

Vick appealed the lower court decision to Montgomery County Circuit Court. However, on September 13, he entered into a plea agreement which was accepted by the circuit court. The terms were a "no contest" plea to a single misdemeanor count of contributing to the delinquency of a minor, a suspended 30-day jail sentence, a fine of $100, and he was ordered to perform 24 hours of community service. Montgomery County Circuit Judge Robert Turk also prohibited Vick from contacting the teenage girls who were at the party. (After planning to appeal, Hill also settled on a similar plea agreement that erased two of the three misdemeanor counts. He pleaded "no contest" to the same charge and received the same penalty as Vick).

In the summer of 2004, Vick was charged with reckless driving and possession of marijuana in New Kent County, Virginia. As part of a plea agreement in that case, Vick was placed in a drug offender program that required him to perform 24 hours of community service, undergo drug counseling and random drug tests, and give up his Virginia driver's license for six months.

In July, as a result of the incidents, Weaver suspended Vick from the team indefinitely; he had already been suspended for the first three games of the 2004 season. A month later, Virginia Tech suspended him from school for the entire 2004 fall semester. School officials also said that he would lose that year of eligibility.

Marcus Vick was reinstated to the school and the football team under specific guidelines that warranted immediate dismissal from the team for further transgressions.

=== 2005 ===
Beamer initially announced that Vick would enter the 2005 season as the team's third-string quarterback, but he quickly won the starting role after impressive spring practices and scrimmages. 2005 was Vick's most successful season, which saw the Hokies contending for a national championship and culminating in an 11–2 record, an ACC Coastal Division title, an appearance in the inaugural ACC Championship Game, and a win in the 2006 Gator Bowl.

The 2005 season, however, saw more controversy surrounding Vick. On October 1, 2005, Vick angered fans in Morgantown, West Virginia with a display of his middle finger to the crowd during the game at West Virginia University. Vick later apologized. During the 2006 Gator Bowl on January 2, he stomped on the leg of Louisville Cardinals defensive end Elvis Dumervil. Dumervil was in a defenseless position trying to get back up after a play. Vick claimed the incident was accidental and asserted he apologized to Dumervil after the game; Dumervil said that no apology was made. Virginia Tech Athletic Director Jim Weaver issued a statement from the university on the incident:

The unsportsmanlike conduct of quarterback Marcus Vick in yesterday's Gator Bowl game against Louisville is unacceptable behavior and contrary to the Hokies Respect Campaign. Such on-field action is not reflective of Virginia Tech football nor of the values we hold at Virginia Tech. I and my colleagues in central administration are embarrassed and this athletic administration will not condone such acts of unsportsmanlike conduct. We will review and assess this incident further and deal with it accordingly.

The referee working the game apologized for missing Vick's stomp, saying he would have thrown Vick out of the game if he had seen it.

Vick lost his privilege to drive a motor vehicle in Virginia as the result of traffic convictions, including reckless driving. On December 17, 2005, he was charged in Hampton, Virginia with speeding, and for the second time, with the more serious misdemeanor charge of driving on a suspended or revoked license. These offenses brought the total of his traffic arrests to nine in Virginia while he was enrolled at Virginia Tech.<

=== Dismissal from Virginia Tech ===
On January 6, 2006, Virginia Tech announced Vick's permanent dismissal from its football program "due to a cumulative effect of legal infractions and unsportsmanlike play". It later emerged that Vick had not informed school officials about the November traffic charges. They only learned about them four days after the Gator Bowl. He was already facing a lengthy suspension for his behavior at the Gator Bowl, but the traffic charges were the last straw.

In 24 career games at Virginia Tech, Vick threw for 2,868 yards, 19 touchdowns, and 15 interceptions while also running 184 times for 492 yards and six touchdowns. However, during the same period, he was charged with nine traffic offenses, as well as convictions for possession of marijuana and contributing to the delinquency of a minor.

In response to being thrown off the team, Vick has been quoted as saying, "It's not a big deal. I'll just move on to the next level, baby."

=== College football statistics ===
Year	Team	Passing						Rushing			
Year	Team	Cmp	Att	Pct	Yds	TD	Int	Att	Yds	Avg	TD
2002	Virginia Tech	Redshirted									
2003	Virginia Tech	30	57	52.6	475	2	5	37	102	2.8	0
2004	Virginia Tech	Suspended									
2005	Virginia Tech	177	289	61.3	2,393	17	10	147	380	2.6	6
Totals		207	346	59.8	2,868	19	15	184	482	2.6	6

== Professional career ==
Vick declared his eligibility for the NFL draft on January 7, 2006. After the 2006 NFL draft, he told ESPN's Michael Smith that he considered himself a better quarterback than Matt Leinart and Jay Cutler.

Pre-draft measurables
Height	Weight	Arm length	Hand span	40-yard dash	10-yard split	20-yard split	20-yard shuttle	Three-cone drill	Vertical jump	Broad jump	Wonderlic
6 ft 0 in (1.83 m)	200 lb (91 kg)	31 1/8 in (0.79 m)	8 3/4 in (0.22 m)	4.56 s	1.61 s	2.66 s	4.08 s	6.94 s	36 in (0.91 m)	9 ft 9 in (2.97 m)	11
All values from NFL Scouting Combine

Despite pre-draft speculation that Vick could go as high as the third round, he went undrafted, becoming an unrestricted free agent who could sign a contract with any team. Many of the NFL's scouts questioned his attitude and his ability to avoid future troubles on and off the field. Vick attended a Miami Dolphins rookie free agent minicamp after the draft and was subsequently signed by the Dolphins to a free agent contract for league minimum pay as a "wide receiver/quarterback/return specialist".

The Dolphins released him on September 2, 2006, to reach the regular season roster limit but re-signed Vick two days later, assigning him to the practice squad. On October 17, 2006, the Dolphins signed him as a wide receiver/kick returner/quarterback. He was moved from the practice squad to the active roster for the team's Week 7 game versus the Green Bay Packers. He was listed as the No. 3 "emergency" quarterback on the depth chart. His first action in the NFL was a regular season game against the New York Jets on December 25, 2006. He played the wide receiver position for the 4th quarter but had no recorded receptions. After the season, his contract expired and the Dolphins opted not to re-sign him.

== Legal troubles after Virginia Tech ==
On January 9, 2006, Vick was charged with three counts of brandishing a firearm, a Class One misdemeanor, in Suffolk, Virginia. A police report alleged that he pointed a gun at a 17-year-old in the parking lot of a McDonald's in Suffolk after Vick's girlfriend had an argument with three people. Vick claimed that the gun in question was a BlackBerry cell phone and that his accusers were trying to blackmail him.

On December 14, 2006, a 17-year-old girl from Montgomery County, Virginia, filed a civil lawsuit against Vick accusing him of molestation of a minor, fraud, and additional charges. In the lawsuit, seeking $6.3 million, the girl claimed that when she was 15 (below the legal age of consent in Virginia), she was forced into a sexual situation with Vick, who was 20 years old, over a nearly two-year-long period. She also alleged that Vick offered to provide her alcohol and marijuana and forced her to have sex with other men. On September 15, 2008, the parties agreed to a settlement in the lawsuit.

On June 13, 2008, a bicycle officer in Norfolk approached a couple arguing in a car. When asked for identification, Vick allegedly took off, driving the car at high speed. When another officer spotted the car and stopped it, Vick failed a sobriety test. He was charged with DUI, misdemeanor eluding police, driving on the wrong side of a street, reckless driving, driving on a suspended license, and was taken into custody. Vick was living at the time in his brother Michael's riverfront mansion in Suffolk and Michael's condominium in the South Beach section of Miami Beach. He was released on bond later Friday morning. On October 20, Vick pleaded guilty to DUI. He was sentenced to twelve months in jail which the judge suspended, a fine of $250, and his Virginia driving license was suspended for a year. He was also convicted of eluding a police officer and driving on the wrong side of the road, and fined $280 on those charges.

In August 2009, a judge ordered him to jail for probation violations including failure to complete an alcohol education program, testing positive for marijuana, missed appointments, and failure to pay court costs and fines. Vick was freed on a $25,000 bond and appealed the decision.

In January 2013, a judge sentenced Vick to five days in jail for failing to produce adequate documentation about his financial status by a court-ordered deadline. On December 30, Vick was arrested in Forsyth County for a second DUI, driving without a license, and driving with an expired car registration.

On April 5, 2016, Vick was charged with assaulting a police officer who was arresting him on a contempt charge in Virginia. On July 11, Vick pled guilty in Newport News, Virginia, to the resisting arrest charge and was ordered to serve one month in jail.

On October 8, 2016, Vick was again arrested on drug possession charges. An officer reportedly detected an odor of marijuana coming from an apartment as they approached it. This odor became stronger after the door was opened by a man inside, who was later identified as Vick. In September 2017, Vick accepted a plea deal and received one year of supervised probation and five years of good behavior.

On March 20, 2017, Vick was arrested in Norfolk, Virginia. In July 2017, Vick pled guilty to a felony drug possession count in connection with this arrest and was sentenced to two years in jail with the full sentence suspended. He was also sentenced to three years of supervised probation.

In February of 2026, Vick was arrested in Chesapeake, Virginia in connection with a domestic dispute that occurred on December 30, 2025. The alleged altercation occurred during a child custody transfer where the mother of his child sustained minor injuries. Vick was charged with misdemeanor assault and battery, and an emergency protective order was granted to the victim.
