= Aaron Brooks (American football) =

American football player (born 1976)

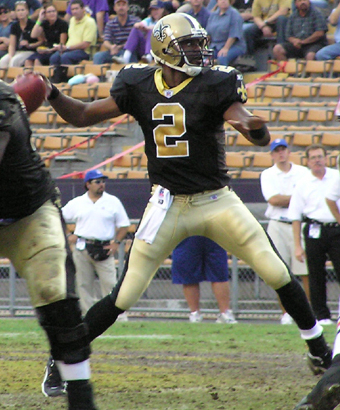
- Brooks with the New Orleans Saints in 2005

No. 2
- Position: Quarterback

Personal information
- Born: March 24, 1976 (age 50); Newport News, Virginia, U.S.
- Listed height: 6 ft 4 in (1.93 m)
- Listed weight: 205 lb (93 kg)

Career information
- High school: Ferguson (Newport News)
- College: Virginia (1994–1998)
- NFL draft: 1999: 4th round, 131st overall pick

Career history
- Green Bay Packers (1999); New Orleans Saints (2000–2005); Oakland Raiders (2006)

Awards and highlights
- New Orleans Saints Hall of Fame

Career NFL statistics
- Passing attempts: 2,963
- Passing completions: 1,673
- Completion percentage: 56.5%
- TD–INT: 123–92
- Passing yards: 20,261
- Passer rating: 78.5
- Rushing yards: 1,534
- Rushing touchdowns: 13
- Stats at Pro Football Reference

Aaron Lafette Brooks (born March 24, 1976) is an American former professional football player who was a quarterback in the National Football League (NFL) for eight seasons, primarily with the New Orleans Saints. He played college football for the Virginia Cavaliers. He was a member of the Saints for six seasons, where he set the franchise records for regular season and career touchdown passes. Brooks spent his first season with the Green Bay Packers, who selected him in the fourth round of the 1999 NFL draft, and his final season with the Oakland Raiders.

Brooks' most successful season was in 2000 when he led the Saints to their first playoff victory in franchise history. For his accomplishments with the franchise, he was inducted to the New Orleans Saints Hall of Fame in 2014.

== Early life ==
Brooks lived in a public housing project in the East End area of Newport News. Mentored by Coach Tommy Reamon, Brooks played high school football and graduated from Homer L. Ferguson High School in Newport News. He was awarded a scholarship to attend the University of Virginia (UVA), from which he graduated in 1999.

== College career ==
Brooks enrolled at the University of Virginia in the fall of 1994 and was a redshirt as a true freshman. He was a backup to Mike Groh in 1995. He competed with fifth year senior Tim Sherman, whose father Tom was the wide receivers coach, for the starting quarterback job in 1996. The Cavaliers were returning defensive players such as Jamie Sharper, James Farrior, and Ronde Barber. The offense was led by running back Tiki Barber. The coaching staff made Sherman, who had played well against Michigan and Virginia Tech in 1995 after starter Mike Groh went down to injury, the primary quarterback instead of the inexperienced Brooks. Nonetheless, Brooks received playing time in nearly all games and was the primary quarterback in a few. Inconsistent quarterback play by both Brooks and Sherman led to an underachieving season, and Virginia fans still debate the quarterback play of the 1996 season.

Brooks was the starter in 1997. Both Brooks and the team struggled in the early part of the season but surged late to finish the season with a 7–4 record. In 1998, the team got off to a strong start and was briefly in the top ten. The highlight of the year, and Brooks' career, was the season finale at Virginia Tech. The Cavaliers were down 29–7 at halftime, but Brooks led the biggest comeback in school history in the 36–32 victory. The Cavaliers finished the regular season with a 9–2 record, which earned them an invitation to the Peach Bowl where they suffered a 35–33 defeat at the hands of Georgia.

== Professional career ==
Pre-draft measurables
Height	Weight	Arm length	Hand span	40-yard dash	10-yard split	20-yard split	20-yard shuttle	Three-cone drill	Vertical jump	Broad jump	Wonderlic
6 ft 3 1/2 in (1.92 m)	203 lb (92 kg)	32 in (0.81 m)	9 1/2 in (0.24 m)	4.53 s	1.54 s	2.62 s	4.29 s	7.52 s	35 1/2 in (0.90 m)	10 ft 0 in (3.05 m)	17
All values from NFL Combine

=== Green Bay Packers ===
In 1999, Brooks began his career as a third-string backup to Brett Favre behind second-string quarterback Matt Hasselbeck, taking no snaps during the regular season.

=== New Orleans Saints ===
The Packers traded Brooks and tight end Lamont Hall to the New Orleans Saints for linebacker K. D. Williams and the Saints' third round pick in the 2001 draft ahead of the 2000 season.

In his first season with the Saints, Brooks took over as starting quarterback after Jeff Blake was sidelined with a broken foot in the team's 11th game of the season. In his first NFL start, Brooks led the Saints to a 31–24 victory over the St. Louis Rams, becoming the first QB in NFL history to defeat the defending Super Bowl champions on the road in his first career start. Brooks led the team to a 3–2 record in his five starts for an overall 10–6 record, winning the NFC West. In the playoffs, the Saints defeated the Rams, 31–28. The Saints were without their starting running back, Ricky Williams, and lost their best receiver, Joe Horn, early in the game. Brooks threw four touchdown passes to lead the Saints to their first playoff win in franchise history, becoming the first QB in NFL history to eliminate the defending Super Bowl champions in his first career postseason start. The Saints then lost their Divisional Playoff game to the Minnesota Vikings, 34–16.

In 2001, the Saints went 7–9, ending on a four-game losing streak. In those last four games of the season, the Saints would be outscored by more than 100 points, 160–52. Brooks threw a then franchise record-tying 26 touchdowns and a career best 3,832 passing yards in his first full season as a starting quarterback; he also threw a then-franchise record 22 interceptions.

In 2002, Brooks lead the Saints to a 6–2 record and guided an offense that averaged 32 points a game through the first half of the season before the team imploded in the second half. The Saints went 3–5 to finish the season, losing their last three games to teams eliminated from playoff contention. Brooks' 27 passing touchdowns were tied for the second-most in the NFL with Peyton Manning and Brett Favre.

2003 was Brooks' most efficient year, compiling an 88.8 passer rating, a 3:1 touchdown to interception ratio, and a 59.1% completion rate, all career bests. However, the Saints finished 8–8 and did not make the playoffs.

In 2004, the Saints started 4–8, but finished the season with a four-game winning streak. The Saints almost made the playoffs but lost out on tiebreakers. Brooks threw 16 interceptions that year, twice as many interceptions as the previous year. 2004 was also the final year Brooks threw for more than 3,000 yards (2,743 meters) in a season.

In late 2005, after losing to the Falcons, the Saints benched Brooks and announced Todd Bouman as the team's starter for the last three games of the season. Brooks finished the year with 17 interceptions to 13 touchdowns, and a 3–10 record in 13 starts.

=== Oakland Raiders ===
After being released by the Saints, Brooks was signed by the Oakland Raiders in March 2006. He was the starter going into training camp. In his first regular season game as a Raider, he was sacked 9 times by the San Diego Chargers in a 27–0 loss. Brooks dislocated his shoulder in his second game against the Baltimore Ravens and missed the next several weeks. Second-year quarterback Andrew Walter started the next seven games for Oakland. After a 2–5 record over that span, a healthy Brooks was placed back into the starter's role. Despite slightly improved play, Brooks was unable to lead the defensive Raiders to very much success finishing with a league worst 2–14 record. Brooks also went on to have a career low 61.7 quarterback rating, and again threw more interceptions, eight, than touchdowns, three. He had an 0–8 record in eight starts for Oakland.

Brooks was released by the Raiders when they did not pick up his option after the 2006 season. In an October 2007 interview with The New York Times, Brooks indicated that he was not retired, stating "I definitely want to play". The New York Times speculated that his free agent status may have been partly fueled by a 2005 CBS interview in which Brooks publicly criticized Saints owner Tom Benson and the NFL for their handling of the Saints during Hurricane Katrina.

== Career statistics ==
Legend
**Bold**	Career high

=== NFL ===
Year	Team	Games			Passing								Rushing				Sacks		Fumbles	
Year	Team	GP	GS	Record	Cmp	Att	Pct	Yds	Avg	TD	Int	Rtg	Att	Yds	Avg	TD	Sck	SckY	Fum	Lost
1999	GB	0	0	–	DNP															
2000	NO	8	5	3–2	113	194	58.2	1,514	**7.8**	9	6	85.7	41	170	4.1	2	15	94	4	1
2001	NO	16	16	7–9	**312**	**558**	55.9	**3,832**	6.9	26	**22**	76.4	**80**	**358**	4.5	1	**50**	**330**	13	2
2002	NO	16	16	**9–7**	283	528	53.6	3,572	6.8	**27**	15	80.1	62	253	4.1	2	36	236	11	5
2003	NO	16	16	8–8	306	518	**59.1**	3,546	6.8	24	8	**88.8**	54	175	3.2	2	34	195	**14**	**11**
2004	NO	16	16	8–8	309	542	57.0	3,810	7.0	21	16	79.5	58	173	3.0	**4**	41	223	13	2
2005	NO	13	13	3–10	240	431	55.7	2,882	6.7	13	17	70.0	45	281	**6.2**	2	33	202	4	2
2006	OAK	8	8	0–8	110	192	57.3	1,105	5.8	3	8	61.7	22	124	5.6	0	26	174	5	3
Total		93	90	38–52	1,673	2,963	56.5	20,261	6.8	123	92	78.5	362	1,534	4.2	13	235	1,454	64	26

=== College ===
Year	Team	Passing						Rushing		
Year	Team	Cmp	Att	Yds	TD	Int	Rtg	Att	Yds	TD
1995	Virginia	0	2	0	0	1	-100.0	0	0	0
1996	Virginia	37	89	517	1	7	78.3	30	65	4
1997	Virginia	164	270	2,282	**20**	7	**151.0**	85	255	5
1998	Virginia	**168**	**322**	**2,545**	15	**10**	127.7	**97**	**320**	**6**
Total		369	683	5,344	36	25	129.8	212	640	14

== Post-playing career ==
After his NFL career, Brooks went into property development. In the summer of 2008, work began on his first project, Burlington Woods, an upscale subdivision located on 17 acres (69,000 m^{2}) in James City County, Virginia. Brooks oversaw the project through its completion, and Ryan Homes took over the construction phase.

Earlier in 2008, he announced plans to invest in Southeast Commerce Center, a redevelopment project in his hometown of Newport News. In a July 2008 interview, Brooks described plans to redevelop part of downtown Newport News. The multimillion-dollar investment would be a mixed-use development between Jefferson and Terminal avenues and 33rd and 29th streets in the economically depressed East End area., including 190 town houses, a grocery store and retail offerings. Vice Mayor Charles Allen, who has represented the district for 16 years on the Newport News City Council, said that it was "significant that one of our own has taken his resources and other resources to show us that we can do it. It's a good day. It's a good day for our community." Brooks commented, "It's a great opportunity to give back to the community and at the same time let retailers know we don't just have the stigma of being 'bad news,' ... a lot of hard-working, middle-class people that live in the area. I'm just trying to make the area better for them." As of August 2010, the project had not commenced, but was reported to be back on track after negotiations between Brooks and the city council. The project is now known as Brooks Crossing and continues as of 2024.

In 2014, Brooks was inducted into the New Orleans Saints Hall of Fame, along with former teammate John Carney.

== Personal life ==
Brooks is the second cousin of Michael and Marcus Vick.

== See also ==
- List of most consecutive starts by an NFL quarterback
