= Siani Lee =

American journalist

- Born: Margaret Englett; October 8, 1962; Seoul, South Korea
- Died: October 28, 2001 (aged 39); Schuylkill Township, Chester County, Pennsylvania, U.S.
- Education: Hampton University (BA)
- Occupation: Television journalist
- Years active: 1987–2001

Siani Lee (born Margaret Englett; October 8, 1962 – October 28, 2001) was a Korean American news anchor and reporter in Philadelphia, Pennsylvania. She previously worked in several other cities including Savannah, Georgia, Pittsburgh, Baltimore, and Washington, DC.

== Life and career ==
Lee was born in Seoul, South Korea and was raised in several military bases as an infant. Lee grew up in Newport News, Virginia where she graduated from Denbigh High School in 1981. Lee graduated from Hampton University in 1985 where she earned a Bachelor of Arts degree in mass communications and journalism. She began her career in 1987 at WTKR-TV in Norfolk, Virginia as a producer. In 1988, she moved to WTOC-TV in Savannah, Georgia where she was a reporter and producer. In 1990, she joined WMAR-TV in Baltimore, Maryland where she spent one year as a general assignment reporter. In 1991, Lee became an anchor and reporter at News Channel 8 in Washington, DC. She earned an award for her in-depth coverage of Washington DC's Asian American community from the National Association for Professional Asian Women. In 1992, Siani earned Sigma Delta Chi Society of Professional Journalists Dateline Award for her report on Korean American and African American race relations.

In 1993 after a brief stint on WTAE in Pittsburgh as a morning news anchor, she joined WCAU-TV (which was owned by CBS at the time) in Philadelphia, Pennsylvania as weekend evening anchor and reporter. She spent six years at the station reporting for major events including the 1993 Storm of the Century, the North American blizzard of 1996, and the station's affiliation swap with KYW-TV in 1995 (WCAU became an NBC-owned station at that time); she also anchored the weekend newscasts. Siani Lee's big break came in 1999 when she joined KYW-TV as the main weekday 6pm co-anchor and consumer reporter.

== Death ==
On Sunday, October 28, 2001, 20 days after her 39th birthday, Lee was driving her Mercedes in Schuylkill Township, Chester County, Pennsylvania, when she went through a stop sign at a major intersection. She was hit on the driver's side in a broadside collision. Lee was not wearing a seat belt at the time and was pronounced dead at the scene from severe neck and head trauma. Local officials had previously expressed concern that the stop sign was easy for drivers to miss, and had approved the addition of a traffic light at the intersection, which was "weeks away" from installation at the time of her death.

== Legacy ==
Lee was the President of the Philadelphia chapter of the Asian American Journalists Association and was the first Asian American to anchor in the Philadelphia market. She served on the board of directors at MANNA, an agency which provided food to AIDS patients. Lee was remembered by her colleagues as a hardworking and valued woman and was also known for her willingness to help others and for her humor.

Lee was posthumously inducted into "The Broadcast Pioneers of Philadelphia's Hall of Fame" on November 29, 2009.
