= Warwick High School (Virginia) =

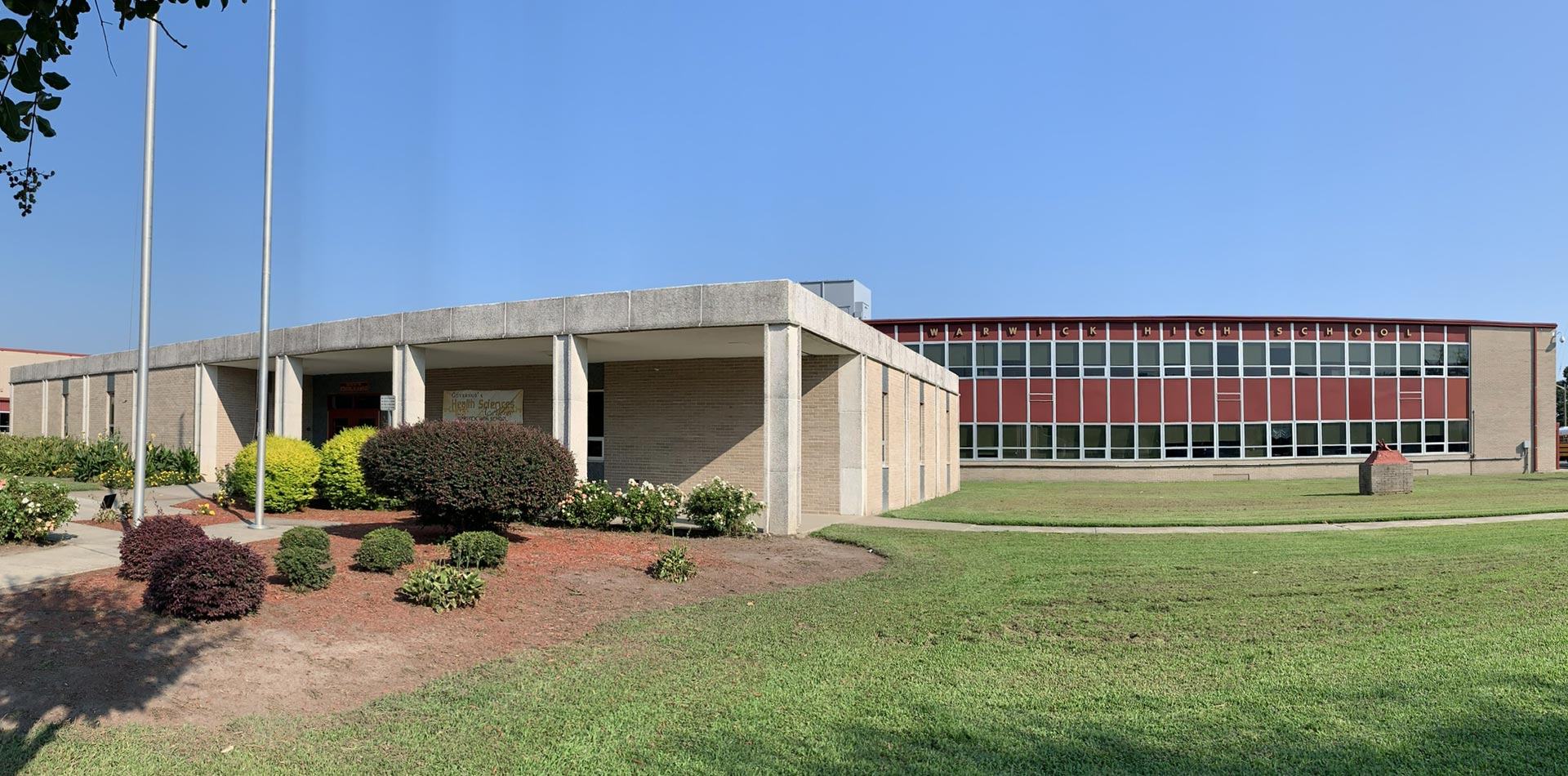
- Front of Warwick High School

Location
- 51 Copeland Lane; Newport News, Virginia, 23601; United States; 37°3′9″N 76°28′32″W

Information
- School type: Public high school
- Founded: 1926
- School district: Newport News Public Schools
- Superintendent: Michelle Mitchell
- CEEB code: 471553
- Principal: Tiffany Thompson
- Grades: 9–12
- Enrollment: 1,522 (2023-24)
- Language: English
- Campus: Suburban
- Colors: Maroon and Gold
- Athletics conference: Virginia High School League; Peninsula District; Eastern Region
- Mascot: Raiders
- Rivals: Menchville High School; Phoebus High School; Woodside High School; Denbigh High School
- Feeder schools: Hines Middle School; Huntington Middle School
- Website: warwick.nn.k12.va.us

Warwick High School is a high school in Newport News, Virginia, United States. Warwick is the oldest of six high schools in the city and has been home to the Newport News Centre for the International Baccalaureate (IB) program since 1995. Warwick is also home to the Governor's Health Science Academy (GHSA), one of nine official Virginia academies in the state. The school's sports teams are nicknamed the Raiders, and previously the Farmers. On average, the student population is around 1,600 students.

== History ==
The school originally opened in 1926 as Morrison High School in the small community of Morrison. It became Warwick High School in 1948. Originally located in Warwick County, it became part of the Newport News Public Schools system in 1958 when the citizenry of the former Warwick County voted to be politically consolidated with the neighboring independent city of Newport News. The facilities at Warwick High School were expanded to their current size in 1968.

Following the 1954 Brown vs. Board of Education decision of the U.S. Supreme Court, racial desegregation lawsuits eventually resulted in a federal court-ordered busing program in Newport News, which began in 1971. Busing changed the nature of Warwick's population and community. However, in the years after the federal court supervision ended, a magnet school approach was adopted to attract students and families to select the school voluntarily.

Also in 1971, the student body voted to change the school mascot from the Farmers to the Raiders after an influx of students came from the recently closed Newport News, Huntington, and Carver High Schools (which were closed due to the city of Newport News desegregating), and the demographics changed from almost entirely white school to a school whose student body was almost 40 percent African-American.

Due to overcrowding and pest-control issues, Warwick High School expanded into the building, formerly the Warwick Early Childhood Center. This building was known as the Senior Center, although students from all grades may have classes there. The Senior Center was closed for first-floor remodeling during the 2022-2023 school year and reopened to students at the start of the 2023-2024 school year. Now known as the Annex building, its first-floor classrooms are dedicated for Governor's Health Science Academy, while the second floor is primarily used for select Advanced Placement (AP) and International Baccalaureate (IB) courses.

== 2022 Assistant Principal arrest ==
In November 2022, Jason Michael Taylor, then Assistant Principal of Operations at Warwick High School in Newport News, was arrested on 13 felony charges related to alleged incidents of sexual abuse involving a teenage student during his prior tenure as a band director at Western Branch High School between 2015 and 2018. Officials state the abuse began when the student was approximately 14–15 years old and continued until she was 18. According to court documents, the incidents reportedly escalated from prolonged hugs and kissing to more serious misconduct, often occurring in the band room.

Taylor remained employed at Warwick High School when charges were filed, and was subsequently suspended following his arrest. In 2023, he pleaded guilty to six counts of indecent liberties with a child in Chesapeake Circuit Court. Later that year, Taylor was sentenced to 24 years in prison, with 16 years suspended, meaning he is only expected to serve eight years behind bars.

== Student achievements ==
During the 2007–2008 school year, Warwick High School started an archery team. The team won the state competition and went to nationals in Louisville, Kentucky.

Warwick High School's Scholastic Bowl team has won the Peninsula District Scholastic Bowl every year since 2017-18.

Students from the debate team qualified for the state championship tournament in the 2021-2022 year.In 2024, Warwick High School's Debate Team placed at the VHSL Class 5 State Championships, held April 26–27 at James Madison University in Harrisonburg.

In 2025, Warwick High School placed 1st at Blue Crab Bowl, Virginia's regional competition of the National Ocean Sciences Bowl, and advanced to nationals. Warwick High School's Blue Crab Bowl Team ultimately placed 7th out of 18 teams at the National Ocean Sciences Bowl Finals.

In 2025, Warwick's HOSA chapter, a co-curricular activity of the Governor's Health Science Academy, competed at Virginia's HOSA 45th State Leadership Conference, where six students place 1st in their respective competitions and advanced to the international level. They ultimately competed at HOSA International Leadership Conference, held June 18–21 in Nashville, Tennessee.

In addition, in 2025, senior Ariana Logsdon won gold at the VHSL Class 5 Cross Country Championship with a 19:15 time, becoming the first individual state champion for Warwick since 1997 in any sport and first female state champion since 1978.

== Demographics ==
On average for the 10 year span of 2012 to 2022:

Category	Enrollment	Percentage
Total Enrollment	1,612	100%
Gender
Male	750	46.8%
Female	862	53.2%
Ethnicity
Native American	12	0.3%
Native Hawaiian	7	0.5%
Asian	90	5.6%
Black	934	63.2%
Hispanic	207	9.2%
White	357	15.6%
Multiple Races	88	5.5%
Students with Disabilities	216	13.6%
Economically Disadvantaged	870	54.7%

== Former principals ==
- Gene Jones (1999—2005)
- Varinda Robinson (2005—2009)
- Rory Stapleton (2009—2015)
- Anthony Frazier (2015—2019)
- Kellie Mason (2019—2024)

== Notable alumni ==
- Will Crutchfield – orchestra conductor
- Tim Fasano – Bigfoot hunter, blogger, author – Class of 1975
- Johnny Gilbert - game show announcer, Jeopardy!
- Gary Hudson – actor - class of 1974
- Henry Jordan – former National Football League player, 5-time NFL champion, member of Pro Football Hall of Fame
- Norman Snead – former National Football League player, quarterback, second overall pick of 1961 NFL draft
- Sonja Sohn (Williams) – actress in the HBO drama The Wire
- William Styron - novelist and essayist, attended two years before transferring to Christchurch School, where he graduated
- Marcus Vick – National Football League player - Class of 2002
- Michael Vick – National Football League player - Class of 1998
- B. W. Webb - National Football League cornerback for the New York Giants
