= Woodside High School (Virginia) =

Location
- 13450 Woodside Lane; Newport News, Virginia 23608; United States; 37°10′23″N 76°31′27″W

Information
- School type: Public Magnet High School
- Founded: 1996
- School district: Newport News Public Schools
- Superintendent: Michele Mitchell (Interim)
- Principal: Mary Hardesty
- Grades: 9–12
- Enrollment: 1,984 (2016-17)
- Language: English
- Campus: Suburban
- Colors: Teal, Purple
- Athletics conference: Virginia High School League; Peninsula District; Eastern Region
- Mascot: Wolverines
- Rivals: Menchville High School; Heritage High School
- Yearbook: Legacy
- Feeder schools: Passage Middle School; Ella Fitzgerald Middle School
- Website: woodside.nn.k12.va.us

Woodside High School is one of six high schools in Newport News, Virginia. The Virginia Department of Education has accredited Woodside since the 2003–04 school year. The school has a twin school, Heritage High School, that was built simultaneously and designed by the same architects.

Woodside High School is a Fully Accredited High School, and it met the Adequate Yearly Progress marks for the No Child Left Behind Act established by the Federal Government.

Woodside is also the home of Newport News Public School's Center for the Arts and Communications Magnet Program, which offers specializations in music, dance, drama, creative writing, communications, and visual arts.

== Athletics ==
Opening in 1996, Woodside's sports teams have won five state titles: One in softball (2001) and four for boys basketball (2003–04, 2004–05, 2022–23, 2023-24).

== Demographics ==
As of October 2009

Category	Enrollment	Percentage
Total Enrollment	2061	100%
Gender
Male	894	43.4%
Female	1167	56.6%
Ethnicity
Native American	22	1.1%
Asian/Pacific Islander	74	3.6%
Black	1136	54.0%
Hispanic	182	8.8%
White	641	31.1%
Unspecified	29	1.4%
Special Education	213	10.3%
Talented and Gifted	155	7.5%
Economically Disadvantaged	696	33.8%

== Notable alumni ==
- Masego (born Micah Davis) – musician
- Mondoe Davis – pastor and former football linebacker

== See also ==
- Newport News Public Schools
- Heritage High School
- Menchville High School
