= Peninsula District =

Location
- Hampton Roads, Virginia United States

District information
- Type: Public
- Grades: 9–12

Other information
- Website: Peninsula District

The Peninsula District is a district of the Virginia High School League (VHSL). It consists of public high schools in the cities of Hampton and Newport News, as well as Gloucester High School in Gloucester County.

Schools in the Peninsula District compete in the VHSL's Class 4 and Class 5 regions.

== Current member schools ==
School	Location	Mascot	Colors	Division (VHSL Class)	Notes
Bethel High School	Hampton	Bruins	Green and Gold	4A	
Denbigh High School	Newport News	Patriots	Red, White, and Blue	4A	
Hampton High School	Hampton	Crabbers	Red and White	4A	Historic football powerhouse
Heritage High School	Newport News	Hurricanes	Maroon and Silver	4A	Newest school, alongside Woodside High School
Kecoughtan High School	Hampton	Warriors	Green and White	5A	
Menchville High School	Newport News	Monarchs	Purple and Gold	5A	
Phoebus High School	Hampton	Phantoms	Blue and Gold	4A	Multiple state football championships
Warwick High School	Newport News	Raiders	Maroon and Gold	5A	Named after the predecessor to the city of Newport News, Warwick County
Woodside High School	Newport News	Wolverines	Teal and Purple	5A	Largest school in the district

== Former member schools ==
- Homer L. Ferguson High School – Newport News (closed in 1996)
- Lafayette High School – Williamsburg (now in the AA Bay Rivers District)
- Newport News High School – Newport News (became Newport News Intermediate School, closed in 1980)
- Tabb High School – York County (now in the AA Bay Rivers District)
- James Blair High School – Williamsburg (converted to middle school in 1973)
- York High School – Yorktown (now in the AA Bay Rivers District)
- Gloucester High School - Gloucester (now in the AA Bay Rivers District, left in 2025)

== Champions ==
Season	Football
2004	Hampton (12–1)
2005	Phoebus (11-1)
2006	Hampton (9–2)
2007	Phoebus (13–1)
2008	Phoebus (15-0)
2009	Phoebus (15-0)
2010	Phoebus (15-0)
2011	Woodside (11–1)
2012	Phoebus (12-1)
2013	Phoebus (10-2)
2014	Heritage (11-2)
2015	Hampton (13–1)
2016	Hampton (12-2)
2017	Phoebus (11-1)
2018	Phoebus (13-2)
2019	Phoebus (12-2)
2020	Phoebus & Warwick (4-2)
2021	Phoebus (14-1)
2022	Phoebus (15-0)
2023	Phoebus (15-0)
2024	Phoebus (14-0)
