= Newport News Public Schools =

School division in Virginia, United States

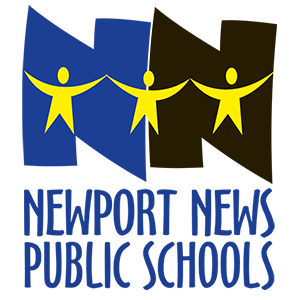

Address
- 12465 Warwick Blvd Newport News, Virginia, 23606-3041; United States

District information
- Type: Public school division
- Motto: College, Career, and Citizen-Ready
- Grades: PK - 12
- Superintendent: Dr. Michele Mitchell
- School board: 7 members
- Chair of the board: Dr. Terri Best
- Governing agency: Virginia Department of Education
- Schools: 45
- Budget: $406.3 million (FY2025-2026)
- NCES District ID: 5102640
- District ID: VA-117

Students and staff
- Students: 25,933 (2024-2025)
- Teachers: 2,026 (2024-2025) (on an FTE basis)
- Student–teacher ratio: 15.3:1 (K-7, 2023-2024) 13.83:1 (8-12, 2023-2024)
- Athletic conference: Peninsula District; Eastern Region

Other information
- Website: nnschools.org sbo.nn.k12.va.us

Newport News Public Schools (NNPS) is a division of Newport News, Virginia that operates the city's system of public schools. NNPS had a 2024-2025 enrollment of 25,933. According to the FY2025-26 Proposed Budget, NNPS employs about 3,895, including approximately 1,897 teachers.

== Governance ==
NNPS is governed by an elected seven-member school board. The seven members of the Newport News Public School Board are elected through a district system for staggered four-year terms, with one member elected at large. Newport News students also elect one non-voting student representative.

A superintendent implements the school board's policies. The current superintendent is Dr. Michele Mitchell. The Newport News School Board announced the appointment of Dr. Michele Mitchell as superintendent of Newport News Public Schools effective August 3, 2023. Dr. Mitchell, who was named acting superintendent of the school division January 2023, had served as the Executive Director of Student Advancement for 11 years, overseeing social work and psychological services, dropout prevention programs, special education services, gifted programs, school counseling, social emotional learning and school based mental health programs.

== Division structure ==
The schools of NNPS are divided into the three standard levels of American primary and secondary education. Newport News Public Schools operates 3 early childhood centers, 24 elementary schools, 7 middle schools, 5 high schools, 1 middle/high combination school, and 9 program sites.

=== High schools ===
- An Achievable Dream Middle & High School (Phoenix)
- Denbigh High School (Patriots)
- Heritage High School (Hurricanes)
- Menchville High School (Monarchs)
- Warwick High School (Raiders)
- Woodside High School (Wolverines)

=== Middle schools ===
- An Achievable Dream Middle & High School(Phoenix)
- Flora G. Crittenden Middle School (Cougars)
- Ella Fitzgerald Middle School (Jazz)
- Gildersleeve Middle School (Seahawks)
- Hines Middle School (Spartans)
- Huntington Middle School (Grade 8) (Vikings)
- Passage Middle School (Panthers)
- Booker T. Washington Middle School (Bay Savers)

=== Elementary schools ===
- An Achievable Dream Academy
- George Washington Carver Elementary School (Colts)
- B.C. Charles Elementary School (Mustangs)
- Deer Park Elementary School (Animals)
- Discovery STEM Academy
- David A. Dutrow Elementary School (Dolphins)
- General Stanford Elementary School (Eagles)
- Greenwood Elementary School (Gators)
- Hidenwood Elementary School (Huskies)
- Hilton Elementary School (Herons)
- Jenkins Elementary School (Jaguars)
- Katherine G. Johnson Elementary School (Stars)
- Kiln Creek Elementary School (Kangaroos)
- Knollwood Meadows Elementary School (Knights)
- George J. McIntosh Elementary School (Scotties)
- Newsome Park Elementary School (Navigators)
- Lutrelle F. Palmer Sr., Elementary School (Pandas)
- Richneck Elementary School (Raccoons)
- Riverside Elementary School (Bears)
- Sanford Elementary School (Seagulls)
- Saunders Elementary School (Spartans)
- Sedgefield Elementary School (Eagles)
- Stoney Run Elementary School (Koala Bears)
- Richard T. Yates Elementary School (Mates)

=== Early Childhood Centers ===
- Denbigh Early Childhood Center (Dinosaurs)
- Marshall Early Learning Center (Mariners)
- Watkins Early Childhood Center (Stars)

== Curriculum ==
=== Magnet Programs ===
Newport News Public Schools offers elementary, middle, and high school students the chance to focus on environmental science, communication and performing arts, aviation, global studies, and math, science, technology, and engineering through a variety of magnet and specialty program options. These include:

The Aviation Academy, located at Denbigh High School, teaches high school students with an emphasis on engineering, particularly in the field of aviation. The academy also offers students a Pilot Ground School course.

The International Baccalaureate Diploma Program teaches students with an emphasis on international learning. Students at Warwick High School can apply to enter a two-year IB program. They must have completed algebra, a year of a foreign language, and an advanced integrated language-arts class, all with grades of at least B; recommendations from teachers; and at least a 3.0 grade point average. The programs are offered in conjunction with the International Baccalaureate.

=== Telecommunications ===
NNPS offers a telecommunications course, other known as Telecom, for high school juniors and seniors. These courses teach the basics of television production and allow students to experience it first-hand at the division's local cable station. This also allows employment opportunities for students to record various events for the school system. These courses are dual enrolled with Norfolk State University. Since the fall of 2021, the Telecom program has partnered with Full Sail University.

=== Non-Traditional Programs ===
NNPS offers several programs that differ from a traditional educational curricula. These include:

The Point Option program offers a unique opportunity for the students in the Newport News community to experience teaching and learning in a non-traditional way. It also offers students of ability and determination a second chance to recapture credits or to accelerate their graduation in order to enter the workforce or post-secondary education.

The Enterprise Academy, an alternative school for students who have been suspended or expelled from their schools or have spent time in correctional facilities, emphasizes business.

New Horizons is a regional education organization.
