= Menchville High School =

Location
- 275 Menchville Road; Newport News, Virginia 23602; United States; 37°05′45″N 76°31′49″W

Information
- School type: Public high school
- Founded: 1970
- School district: Newport News Public Schools
- Superintendent: Dr. Michele Mitchell
- Principal: Jason Hollar
- Grades: 9–12
- Enrollment: 1,759 (2023–2024)
- Language: English
- Campus: Suburban
- Colors: Purple and Gold
- Athletics conference: Virginia High School League; Peninsula District; Eastern Region; 5A South Conference 10
- Mascot: Monarchs
- Feeder schools: Gildersleeve Middle School; Hines Middle School; Huntington Middle School
- Website: menchville.nn.k12.va.us

Menchville High School is a public high school located in Newport News, Virginia, United States. It is one of six high schools in the Newport News Public Schools division. Menchville is home to the division’s Dual Language Immersion program, which teaches academic content in two languages and promotes bilingual proficiency. The school also offers a range of Advanced Placement (AP) courses. The school's sports teams are nicknamed the Monarchs. On average, the student population is around 1,700 students.

== Demographics ==
Year	2005	2010	2015	2020	2023
Total Enrollment	2020	1772	1578	1662	1759-1761
Gender
Male	986	882	818	908	934
Female	1034	890	760	754	825
Ethnicity
Native American	13	54	6	2	3
Asian/Pacific Islander	50	63	51	83	48
Black	898	732	598	564	618-619
Hispanic	62	—	122	253	393
White	988	898	755	663	577-578
Multiple Races	—	25	46	97	120
Unspecified	9	—	—	—	—
Special Education/Students with Disabilities	188	224	192	229	250
Talented and Gifted	0	180	—	—	—
Economically Disadvantaged	566	449	618	662	857
English Learners	—	—	8	118	235

=== Percentages ===
Year	2005	2010	2015	2020	2023
Total Enrollment	100%	100%	100%	100%	100%
Gender					
Male	48.8%	49.8%	51.8%	54.6%	53.1%
Female	51.2%	50.2%	48.2%	45.4%	46.9%
Ethnicity					
Native American	0.6%	3%	0.4%	0.1%	0.2%
Asian/Pacific Islander	2.5%	3.6%	3.2%	5%	2.7%
Black	44.5%	41.3%	37.9%	33.9%	35.2%
Hispanic	3.1%	—	7.7%	15.2%	22.3%
White	48.9%	50.7%	47.8%	39.9%	32.8%
Multiple Races	—	1.4%	2.9%	5.8%	6.8%
Unspecified	0.4%	—	—	—	—
Special Education/Students with Disabilities	9.3%	12.6%	12.2%	13.8%	14.2%
Talented and Gifted	0%	10.2%	—	—	—
Economically Disadvantaged	28%	25.3%	39.2%	39.8%	48.7%
English Learners	—	—	0.5%	7.1%	13.3%

== Sports ==
=== VA state championships ===
- Boys' indoor track – 1972, 1973, 1980, 1982, 1983,1984, 1985, 1986, 1987, 2016, 2017, 2018
- Boys' outdoor track – 1972, 1979, 1980, 1981, 1994, 1995, 1996, 1997, 1998, 1999, 2000, 2001, 2002, 2003, 2004, 2005, 2006, 2007, 2008, 2009, 2010, 2011, 2012, 2013, 2014, 2015, 2016, 2017, 2018
- Wrestling – 1976
- Soccer - 2003
- Baseball – 2009
- Boys' swimming – 2016
- Girls Basketball - 2022

== Former principals ==
- John M. Caywood (1970–1988)
- John "Killer" Kilpatrick (1988–1997)
- Robert Johnson (1997–2002)
- Caryn Boyd (2002–2004)
- James "Bobby" Surry (2004–2022)
- Lisa Egolf (2022–2024)

== Notable alumni ==
- Karen Barefoot – basketball coach
- Cocoa Brown – actress
- Jharel Cotton – MLB pitcher for the Oakland A's
- Quiana Grant – supermodel, appeared in the 2008 Sports Illustrated Swimsuit Issue
- Kwamie Lassiter – former NFL free safety, Arizona Cardinals, San Diego Chargers, St. Louis Rams
- David Macklin – former NFL cornerback, Indianapolis Colts, Arizona Cardinals, Washington Redskins
- RJ May – member of the South Carolina House of Representatives since 2020
- Christopher Phillips – author, founder of Socrates Café
- David Pope (basketball) – former NBA small forward, Kansas City Kings, Wyoming Wildcatters, Seattle SuperSonics
- Al Toon – former NFL wide receiver, New York Jets
