= Timeline of Newport News, Virginia =

The following is a timeline of the history of the city of Newport News, Virginia, United States, which incorporated in 1896. For earlier history related to this same geographic area, see Warwick County, Virginia and Kecoughtan, Virginia.

== 19th century ==
- 1862 – Naval Battle of Hampton Roads fought near Newport News village during the American Civil War.
- 1880 – Old Dominion Land Company created by Collis Potter Huntington "to secure railway right-of-ways" on the Virginia Peninsula.
- 1882 – Chesapeake and Ohio Railway begins operating.
- 1883 – Hotel Warwick in business.
- 1886 – Chesapeake Dry Dock and Construction Company (later Newport News Shipbuilding and Dry Dock Co.) in business.
- 1888 – Warwick County, Virginia seat moves temporarily to Newport News from Denbigh.
- 1889
  - Newport News Light & Water Company in business.
  - YMCA branch organized.
- 1890
  - Citizens Railway (Hampton-Newport News) begins operating.
  - Horse-drawn Newport News Street Railway begins operating (approximate date).
  - Original First Baptist Church (Newport News, Virginia) built.
  - Population: 4,449.
- 1891
  - Courthouse built.
  - First National Bank established.
- 1894 – Adath Jeshurun synagogue built.
- 1896
  - January 16: City of Newport News incorporated, independent of Warwick County, Virginia.
  - Daily Press newspaper begins publication.
  - Fire station built.
  - Warwick County court returns to previous Denbigh, Virginia location.
- 1900 – Population: 19,635.

== 20th century ==
- 1901 – Star and Times-Herald newspapers begin publication.
- 1902 - First Baptist Church (Newport News, Virginia) moves to middle of 29th street
- 1904 – U.S. Custom House and Post Office built.
- 1906 – Buxton Hospital established.
- 1907 - First Baptist Church (Newport News, Virginia) rebuilt after fire the previous year
- 1908
  - Virginia State School for Colored Deaf and Blind Children opens.
  - Chamber of Commerce formed.
- 1910 – Olympic Theatre in business.
- 1914 – Curtis Flying Field begins operating near Newport News.
- 1917
  - U.S. military Hampton Roads Port of Embarkation headquartered in Newport News during World War I.
  - U.S. War Department Camp Alexander, Camp Hill, and Camp Stuart begin operating in vicinity of Newport News (approximate date).
- 1918
  - Jefferson Avenue Park (housing) established.
  - U.S. military Camp Eustis (later Fort Eustis) begins operating near Newport News.
  - Influenza outbreak.
- 1919
  - Newport News Shipbuilding and Dry Dock Company's Apprentice School established.
  - Hilton Village (housing) built.
  - Newport News Victory Arch erected.
- 1920
  - Council–manager form of government begins.
  - Philip W. Hiden becomes mayor.
- 1923 – WNEW radio begins broadcasting.
- 1924 – Collis P. Huntington High School built.
- 1927 – Kecoughtan becomes part of Newport News.
- 1928
  - James River Bridge opens.
  - WGH (AM) radio begins broadcasting.
- 1929 – Newport News Public Library built.
- 1930
  - Dodge Boat & Plane Co. in business.
  - Mariners' Museum founded.
- 1932 – James River Country Club founded.
- 1933
  - August 23: Hurricane.
  - U.S. military aircraft carrier USS Ranger launched at Newport News Shipbuilding and Drydock Company.
- 1937 – Aberdeen Gardens (housing) built in nearby Hampton for shipworkers.
- 1942 – U.S. military Hampton Roads Port of Embarkation headquartered in Newport News during World War II.
- 1945 – Citizens Rapid Transit Co. founded.
- 1946 – Electric streetcar stops operating.
- 1947 – WTID radio begins broadcasting.
- 1949 – Patrick Henry Airport begins operating.
- 1950 – Population: 42,358.
- 1952
  - Anchor Drive-In cinema in business.
  - Warwick County becomes the City of Warwick.
- 1954 – October 15: Hurricane Hazel occurs.
- 1956 – Newmarket Shopping Center in business.
- 1958 – July 1: City of Warwick consolidated into city of Newport News.
- 1959
  - U.S. Army Transportation Museum established in nearby U.S. military Fort Eustis.
  - Hampton Roads Academy opens with sixty students between grades 7 and 11.
- 1960
  - Interstate 64 highway construction completed.
  - Population: 113,662.
- 1961 – Christopher Newport College opens.
- 1967 – Todd Stadium opens.
- 1968 – Afro-American Historical and Genealogical Society Hampton Roads branch formed.
- 1970 - Denbigh Baptist Christian School opens with 15 kindergarten students.
- 1971 – September: School "court-ordered busing" begins.
- 1972 – City Hall built.
- 1975 – Newmarket North Mall in business.
- 1979
  - September: Hurricane David occurs.
  - First Baptist Church (Newport News, Virginia) opens satellite campus 8 miles north of original downtown area.
- 1980 – Population: 144,903.
- 1981 – Amtrak Newport News station built.
- 1982 – Virginia Port Authority's affiliate Virginia International Terminals begins operating the Newport News Marine Terminal.
- 1984 – U.S. Continuous Electron Beam Accelerator Facility (later Jefferson Lab) established.
- 1987 – Patrick Henry Mall in business.
- 1992
  - Monitor–Merrimac Memorial Bridge–Tunnel opens.
  - Newport News/Williamsburg International Airport new terminal built.
- 1993 – Bobby Scott becomes U.S. representative for Virginia's 3rd congressional district.
- 1996
  - July: Hurricane Bertha occurs.
  - Warwick SRO housing created.
  - City website online (approximate date).

== 21st century ==
- 2005 – Ferguson Center for the Arts opens.
- 2010
  - McKinley L. Price becomes mayor.
  - U.S. military Joint Base Langley–Eustis in operation near city.
  - Warwick County Historical Society active.
  - Population: 180,719 in city; 1,676,822 in Virginia Beach-Norfolk-Newport News, VA-NC Metropolitan Statistical Area.

== See also ==
- Warwick County, Virginia
- History of Newport News, Virginia
- List of mayors of Newport News, Virginia
- National Register of Historic Places listings in Newport News, Virginia
- History of Hampton Roads area
- Timelines of other cities in Virginia: Alexandria, Hampton, Lynchburg, Norfolk, Portsmouth, Richmond, Roanoke, Virginia Beach

== Bibliography ==
- Newport News, Hampton, Phoebus and Old Point, Va. Directory: 1910, Richmond: Hill Directory Company, 1909
  - 1917 ed.
- Greater Newport News 'The Shipbuilding City'. Pen and Picture Sketches. Illustrated Cities. 1915.
- D.A. Calhoun (1919), Report on Municipal Survey of Newport News, Virginia, 1919, Better Newport News Association
- Federal Writers' Project (1941), "Newport News", Virginia: a Guide to the Old Dominion, American Guide Series, Oxford University Press, pp. 259+
- Alexander Crosby Brown (1946). Newport News' 325 Years: A Record of the Progress of a Virginia Community. Newport News Golden Anniversary Corporation. OCLC 6247364.
- City Consolidation in the Lower Peninsula, Charlottesville: University of Virginia, Bureau of Public Administration, 1956, "Report on the advantages and disadvantages of consolidating the cities of Hampton, Newport News, and Warwick"
- Annie Lash Jester. Newport News, Virginia 1607–1960. Richmond: Whittet & Shepperson, 1961.
- Van Hawkings. Hampton/Newport News: A Pictorial History. Virginia Beach: The Donning Company/Publishers, Inc, 1975.
- Ory Mazar Nergal, ed. (1980), "Newport News, VA", Encyclopedia of American Cities, New York: E.P. Dutton, p. 234, OL 4120668M
- Parke Rouse, Jr. (1986). Good Old Days in Hampton and Newport News. Richmond: Dietz Press. OCLC 13983158.
- John V. Quarstein and Parke S. Rouse Jr. Newport News: A Centennial History. Newport News: City of Newport News, 1996
- Melissa Simpson (June 25, 1996), "Glance At 100 Years: A City's History 1896–Present", Daily Press, archived from the original on January 21, 2011 (Timeline)
- Jane Carter Webb (2003). Newport News. Images of America. Arcadia. ISBN 978-1-4396-2947-5.
- Paul T. Hellmann (2006). "Virginia: Newport News". Historical Gazetteer of the United States. Taylor & Francis. ISBN 1-135-94859-3.
