= History of Newport News, Virginia =

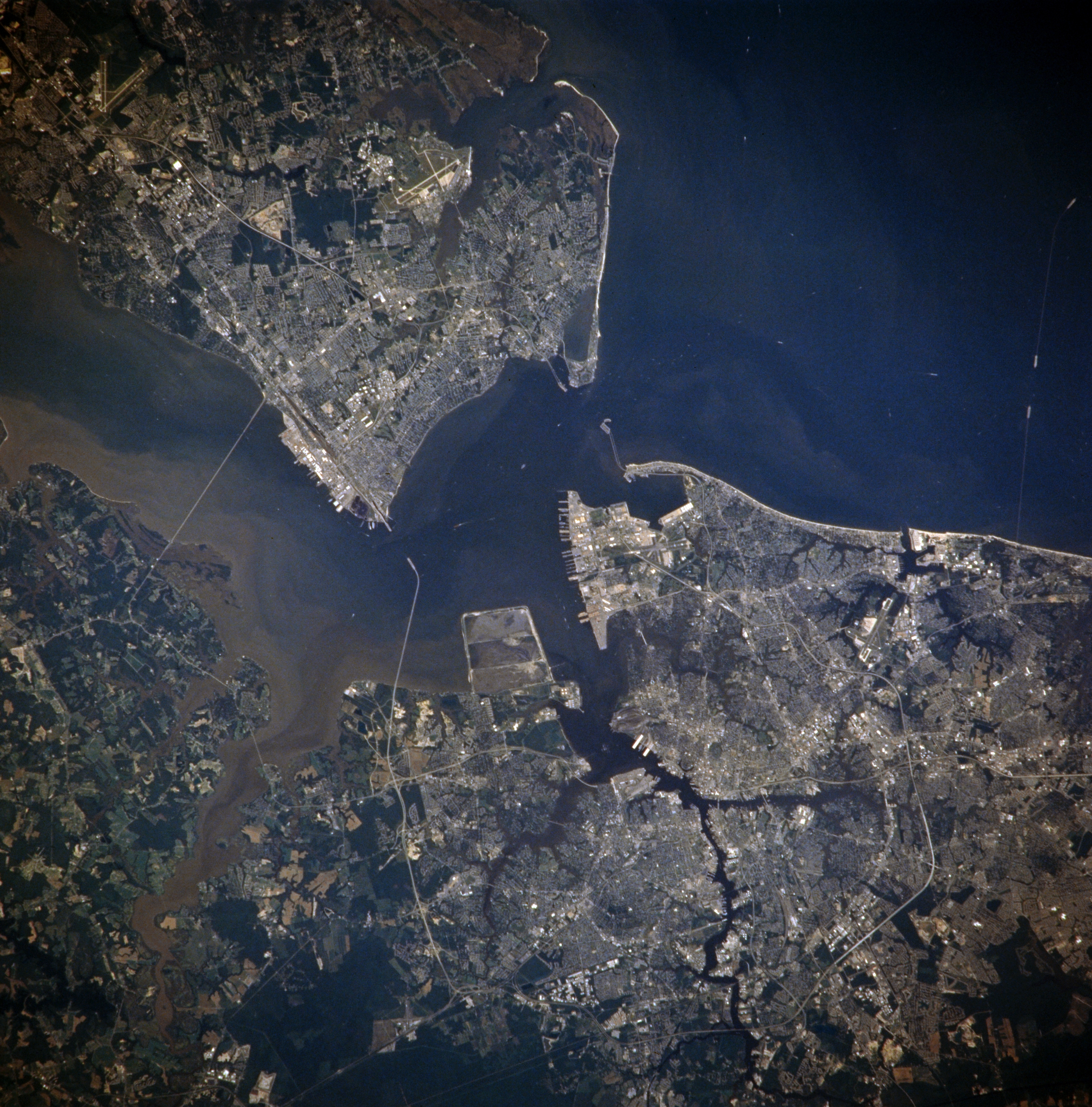
Newport News, Hampton, Portsmouth and Norfolk, Virginia, from space, July 1996 (Newport News is seen in the upper left quadrant)

Newport News has a long history dating back to the days of Jamestown, Virginia. The area which is now the city of Newport News has existed under different names and forms including Elizabeth Cittie, Warwick River Shire, Warwick County, Virginia, Warwick City, and the current independent city of Newport News.

== Newport News in Elizabeth Cittie, Warwick County ==
During the 17th century, shortly after establishment of Jamestown, Virginia, in 1607, English settlers and explorers began settling the areas adjacent to Hampton Roads. In 1610, Sir Thomas Gates took possession of a nearby Native American village which became known as Kecoughtan.

In 1619, the area of Newport News was included in one of four huge corporations of the Virginia Company of London, and became known as Elizabeth Cittie, which extended west all the way to Skiffe's Creek (currently the border between Newport News and James City County. Elizabeth Cittie also included all of present-day South Hampton Roads.

By 1634, the English colony of Virginia consisted of a total population of approximately 5,000 inhabitants and was redivided into eight shires of Virginia, which were renamed as counties shortly thereafter. The area of Newport News became part of Warwick River Shire, which became Warwick County in 1637. By 1810, the county seat was at Denbigh. For a short time in the late 19th century, the county seat was moved to Newport News.

Early Warwick County and Elizabeth City consisted of farms and plantations granted to landholders and settlers. Some of these included Marie’s Mount, the Newport News (Parker West) Farm at present-day 18th Street and Harbor Road, Blunt Poynt, Denbigh Plantation, Windmill Point, Bolthorpe Plantation, Celey's, Richneck Plantation, Stanley Hundred, Bourbon, Endview Plantation, Lee Hall Mansion, Cedar Grove, Briarfield and others. In 1704 there were just 125 properties registered in Warwick. Bourbon, Endview, Lee Hall and Cedar Grove (privately occupied) are still standing.

Daniel Gookin, Sr. born in Newcestown, Ireland, arrived in 1621 and is the first documented owner of land in lower Newport News. Gookin's tract of over 1,600 acres (6.5 km^{2}) ran along the James River from Newport News Point at least four miles (6 km) to the north. This tract of land had been known by Captain John Smith who had noted that there was a spring with good water here, where ships navigating the James stopped for fresh water. Between 1632 and 1639, John Chandler bought Newport News from Daniel Gookin, Jr. A large portion of this land included a cattle plantation called Marie’s Mount. The bulk of the tract lay in the long, narrow County of Warwick, which fronted the James River. Tobacco wharves and warehouses lined the river’s deep-water docks. The Newport News acreage along the Hampton Roads waterfront also included fresh water springs where ships navigating the James filled their water casks. John later sold the Marie’s Mount portion of the land to Capt. Benedict Stafford, perhaps in the 1650s when his sons were forming their families. Chandler’s land was eventually divided into a number of farms including Newport News Farm, Pumpkin Hall, the Washington Burk tract, the Wilbern tract, and the Hawkins tract. This property comprises all of the land in Newport News along the James River from Newport News Point to the Mariner's Museum.

== 1881–1896: Railroad transforms tiny farming village into new city ==
Newport News was merely an area of farm lands and a fishing village until the coming of the railroad and the subsequent establishment of the great shipyard.

As a 16-year-old in 1837, Collis P. Huntington had visited the rural village known as Newport News Point. He later became wealthy as one of the men who built the first transcontinental railroad across the western United States. He was recruited to help complete the railroad link from the Fall Line of the James River to the Ohio River, which was accomplished in 1873.

The completion of the new Chesapeake and Ohio Railway (C&O) also opened up access to the massive coal resources of West Virginia. However, a deepwater port was needed; the James River at Richmond was too shallow for colliers.

The solution for the C&O was its Peninsula Subdivision, built as an extension from Richmond east about 75 miles (121 km) to Newport News Point. Opened in late 1881, it provided an important pathway for coal mined in West Virginia to reach the harbor of Hampton Roads for coast wise and export shipping.

No place on the Peninsula benefited more from the completion of the C&O's Peninsula Subdivision than southeastern Warwick County, soon to become better known as Newport News. The Chesapeake and Ohio Railway became one of the country's wealthiest as West Virginia coal moved eastward to the coal piers. The coal volume of the C&O, combined with that of the Norfolk and Western Railway (N&W) shipping from Lambert's Point and that of the later-completed Virginian Railway (VGN) at Sewell's Point turned the harbor of Hampton Roads, the East Coast of the United States' largest ice-free port, into the largest coal export point in the world by 1915.

Collis P. Huntington and his associates set developing the tiny unincorporated community at Newport New Point. His Old Dominion Land Company built the landmark Hotel Warwick, opened in 1883, which played a significant role in the development of the city. The hotel dominated the landscape, and was the civic and commercial center of the area during its early years. The first bank at Newport News, the first newspaper, the U.S. post office, the federal customs office, and even the municipal government of Warwick County were each located within the Hotel Warwick, at least for a time. It was also the site in 1886 of the organizational meeting for the Chesapeake Dry Dock and Construction Company. The latter evolved into the Newport News Shipbuilding and Dry Dock Company.

For a brief time, Warwick County shifted the location of its county seat to Newport News from the historic location at Denbigh, where it had been situated since colonial times. However, the growth at Newport News was such that, in 1896, by an act of the Virginia General Assembly, it became one of only two Virginia localities to ever become an independent city without the additional stepping-stone of first becoming an incorporated town. (Virginia has had an independent city political subdivision since 1871). Walter A. Post served as the city's first mayor.

In the early years of the new city, leaders of the community and shipyard were virtually interchangeable. The newly incorporated city's first mayor, initially appointed, and then elected in 1898, was Walter A. Post. He had come to the area as one of the builders of the C&O Railway's terminals. He later became president of the shipyard, serving from March 9, 1911, to February 12, 1912, when he died.

== World War I ==
On March 14, 1914, Albert L. Hopkins, a young New Yorker trained in engineering took over leading the shipyard. He was traveling to England on the RMS Lusitania on shipyard business when he died on May 7, 1915, after the ship was torpedoed and sunk by a German U-boat off Queenstown on the Irish coast. 127 other Americans also lost their lives. His assistant Fred Gauntlett, was also on board, but was able to swim to safety. The Lusitania incident was among the events that brought the United States into World War I. Between 1918 and 1920, NNS delivered 25 destroyers.

Among all of the early shipyard leaders, after city and shipyard founder Collis Huntington, Homer Lenoir Ferguson is probably the best remembered for various roles in the community as well as his work and long tenure at the shipyard. He was a manager there when Albert Hopkins died, and assumed the presidency the following July. He saw the company through both world wars.

Hilton Village

As war clouds loomed over the U.S. in 1917, Ferguson had a major role in the development of Hilton Village, located just northwest of the shipyard, it became one of the first planned communities in the country. Built in 1918 by the federal government to house shipyard workers, the planners met with the wives of shipyard workers. Based on their input 14 house plans were designed for the projected 500 English-village-style homes. After the war, in 1922, Henry Huntington, who had a close relationship with Ferguson, acquired it from the government, and helped facilitate the sale of the homes to shipyard employees and other local residents. Three streets there were named after Post, Hopkins, and Ferguson. Hilton Village was the first significant suburb in Warwick County.

== Town of Kecoughtan ==
The incorporated town of Kecoughtan was formed on January 1, 1916, within Elizabeth City County. Eleven years later it was annexed by the independent city of Newport News on January 1, 1927. It is now part of the East End neighborhood of Newport News.

== World War II ==
After the first world war, Newport News Shipbuilding began building aircraft carriers. Ranger was delivered in 1934. It is an activity that was continuing as of 2008. At the shipyard, Homer Ferguson served until July 31, 1946, after the second World War had ended on both the European and Pacific fronts. As a noted community leader, he was a co-founder of the Mariners' Museum with Archer M. Huntington and his wife, sculptor Anna Hyatt. Ferguson remained active with the museum until his death. The former Homer L. Ferguson High School was named for him, as was the more recent Ferguson Center for the Performing Arts, located adjacent to the Mariners' Museum and Christopher Newport University.

== Consolidation with Warwick ==
A wave of political consolidations swept across the Hampton Roads region beginning in the 1950s after the fast population growth years of World War II and the period after. Independent city status guarantees protection against annexation of territory by adjacent communities. After years of resisting annexation efforts by Newport News, in 1952, Warwick County was successful in petitioning the Virginia General Assembly to become the independent city of Warwick. The first and only city manager of Warwick was J. Clyde Morris.

In 1958, the citizenry of the cities of Warwick and Newport News voted by referendum to consolidate the two cities, choosing to assume the better-known name of Newport News, and forming the third largest city population-wise in Virginia with a 65 square miles (168 km^{2}) area. The boundaries of the city of Newport News today are essentially the boundaries of the original Warwick River Shire and those of Warwick County for most of its existence, with the exception of minor border adjustments with neighbors.

== Huntington family, notable community roles ==
In addition to Collis, other members of the Huntington family also played major roles in Newport News. After his uncle's death, his nephew, Henry E. Huntington, assumed leadership of the shipyard. Huntington Park, developed after World War I near the northern terminus of the James River Bridge, is named for him.

Collis Huntington's son, Archer Milton Huntington and his wife, sculptor Anna Hyatt Huntington, developed the Mariners' Museum beginning in 1932, creating a natural park and the community's Mariners' Lake in the process. A major feature of Newport News, the Mariners' Museum has grown to become one of the largest and finest maritime museums in the world.

== See also ==
- Denbigh Plantation
- Warwick County, Virginia
- First Baptist Church (Newport News, Virginia)
- Timeline of Newport News, Virginia
- List of mayors of Newport News, Virginia
- Native American tribes in Virginia
