= Semmes =

Semmes may refer to:

- Semmes (surname), a surname
- Semmes, Alabama, a community in southwest Alabama
- USS Semmes, more than one United States Navy ship
