= Walter Lovett =

American football player and coach (1929–2025)

Biographical details
- Born: January 5, 1929; Hampton, Virginia, U.S.
- Died: March 18, 2025 (aged 96)
- Education: Virginia State (1951)

Playing career
- 1947–1950: Virginia State
- Position: Quarterback

Coaching career (HC unless noted)
- 1955–1963: Newport News Carver HS (VA)
- 1965–1969: Virginia State (line)
- 1970–1972: Virginia State
- 1974–1980: Hampton

Head coaching record
- Overall: 56–48–1 (college)

Accomplishments and honors

Championships
- 2 CIAA (1970, 1972); 1 CIAA Northern Division (1972)

Walter Lloyd Lovett (January 5, 1929 – March 18, 2025) was an American football player and coach. He served as the head football coach at Virginia State University from 1970 to 1972 and at Hampton University in Hampton, Virginia from 1974 to 1980, compiling a career college football coaching record of 56–48–1. Lovett was the line coach at Virginia State for five seasons prior to taking the head coaching position there. He died at home on March 18, 2025, at the age of 96.

== Head coaching record ==
=== College ===
Year	Team	Overall	Conference	Standing	Bowl/playoffs
Virginia State Trojans (Central Intercollegiate Athletic Association) (1970–1972)
1970	Virginia State	8–2	6–1	2nd (Northern) (Note: Morgan State won the CIAA's Northern Division title, but opted not to play in the CIAA championship game. Second-place Virginia State earned the Northern Division's playoff berth and beat Southern Division champion, Johnson C. Smith, in the conference title game.)	
1971	Virginia State	5–3–1	3–2	3rd (Northern)	
1972	Virginia State	8–3	5–0	1st (Northern)	
Virginia State:		21–8–1	14–3		
Hampton Pirates (Central Intercollegiate Athletic Association) (1974–1980)
1974	Hampton	3–7	3–4	5th	
1975	Hampton	5–5	5–3	T–4th	
1976	Hampton	7–4	6–2	2nd	
1977	Hampton	7–4	5–3	4th	
1978	Hampton	5–6	4–4	8th	
1979	Hampton	3–8	2–6	T–6th	
1980	Hampton	5–6	3–4	T–7th	
Hampton:		35–40	28–26		
Total:		56–48–1			
National championship Conference title Conference division title or championship game berth
