= Newport News High School =

High school in Virginia, United States

Coordinates: 36°58′57.8″N 76°25′47.8″W

Newport News High School was a high school located in Newport News, Virginia, United States. It was located at 3100 Huntington Avenue and operated by Newport News Public Schools.

== History ==
In 1896, the first segregated white high school in Newport News was in the First National Bank building at Washington Avenue and 28th Street. Its first principal was Horace H. Epes. It later held classes at Central School from 1899 until Central School burned down in 1913. Classes then met at John W. Daniel School, which was constructed in 1908. Both Central and Daniel Schools were in the 3100 block of Lafayette (later Huntington) Avenue. Walter Reed School at 2410 Wickham Avenue served as a high school until Newport News High School was built in 1924. Daniel served as a public school until 1960, when it became the first home of Christopher Newport University.

Newport News boasted one of the finest athletic fields in Virginia with the opening in 1935 of a concrete stadium, Saunders Stadium, with classrooms below at Newport News High School. A new gymnasium, named for the long-time athletic director and coach Julius "Julie" Conn, was opened in 1964.

From January 27, 1956, to December 14, 1965, Newport News High School's varsity basketball teams won 100 consecutive home games.

In 1971, Newport News High School was converted, along with George Washington Carver and Collis P. Huntington High Schools, to an intermediate school after the city's school district freedom-of-choice plan was struck down in the federal court and school districting went into effect.

In 1980, Newport News Intermediate School was closed.

The school building is now used by the U.S. Navy as an enlisted barracks for ships undergoing maintenance at Newport News Shipbuilding, and is named Huntington Hall.

== Athletics ==
Virginia high school athletic records are kept by the Virginia High School League

=== Baseball ===
- State IA baseball championship runner-up 1953 G. Washington-Danville. 1, Newport News 0
- State IA baseball championship 1920

=== Basketball ===
- State IA basketball championship 1964 Newport News 66, Hampton 54
- State I basketball championship 1958 Newport News 50, Granby 48
- State I basketball championship 1957 Newport News 53, Virginia-Bristol 31
- State I basketball championship 1956 Newport News 63, Geo. Washington-Alex. 52
- State I basketball championship 1952 Newport News 55, Washington-Lee 37
- State I basketball championship 1951 Newport News 44, Woodrow Wilson 42
- State I basketball championship runner-up 1950 Granby 57, Newport News 34
- State I basketball championship runner-up 1948 John Marshall 45, Newport News 35
- State I basketball championship runner-up 1944 Thom. Jefferson-Rich 32, Newport News 27
- State I basketball championship runner-up 1943 Newport News 33, Thom. Jefferson-Rich. 26
- State I basketball championship 1942 Newport News 31, John Marshall 24
- State I basketball championship 1938 Newport News 25, Thom. Jefferson-Rich. 23
- State I basketball championship runner-up 1934 Jefferson Sr.-Roanoke 23, Newport News 22
- State I basketball championship runner-up 1933 George Washington 24, Newport News 17
- State I basketball championship 1931 Newport News 29, Geo. Washington-Dan. 19

=== Football ===
- State AAA football championship 1931
- State AAA football championship 1929 – Maury, Norfolk, Newport News (tie)
- State AAA football championship 1925 – Newport News 7, Lynchburg 6
- State AAA football championship 1920 – Newport News 14 / Jefferson Senior, Roanoke 7. Newport News' coach in the 1920 season was Nathaniel Jarrett Webb, Sr. (April 25, 1891 – July 18, 1943).

=== Virginia State track and field championships ===
Newport News High School won 21 state outdoor track and field championships.

Ronald Ray still holds the legacy national record for 440 yards, set in 1973.

== Notable alumni and faculty ==
- Willie Armstead
- Herbert H. Bateman
- Eric Burden, first black student to attend the all-white Newport News High School in 1963
- Thomas N. Downing, politician
- Lefty Driesell, basketball coach.
- David Ellenson, rabb
- Joe S. Frank, politician
- Ava Gardner, actor
- Jimmye Laycock, 1970, offensive coach, Newport News High School; former head football coach, College of William and Mary
- John Montague, former Major League Baseball pitcher
- Thomas Granville Pullen Jr., former principal (1926); president, University of Baltimore
- Parke S. Rouse, Jr., 1933 graduate, newspaper columnist and author of several regional history books
- Susan Sandler, author/screenwriter, Crossing Delancey
- John B. Todd
- Nathaniel Jarrett Webb (1891–1943), 1919–1921 football coach, math and science teacher; later member of Virginia House of Delegates, 1936–1939
