= Maryus Jones =

American politician

Colonel Maryus Jones
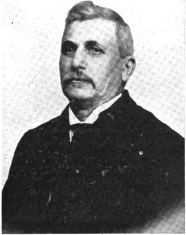

Mayor of Newport News
- In office 1908–1912
- Preceded by: Samuel R. Buxton
- Succeeded by: Bernard B. Semmes

Personal details
- Born: July 8, 1844 Marlefield, Gloucester County, Virginia, United States
- Died: January 26, 1923 (aged 78) Newport News, Virginia, United States

Maryus Jones (July 8, 1844 – January 26, 1923) was the mayor of Newport News, Virginia from September 1, 1908 to September 1, 1912. Jones was born in Gloucester County, Virginia at Marlfield Plantation. He was a direct descendant of Roger Jones, who came to Virginia in 1680 with Lord Colepeper. Prior to serving as mayor, he was a colonel in the Confederate Army. He took part in the dedication of a memorial to Confederate soldiers at Greenlawn Cemetery in 1909.

Jones fought in several battles in the American Civil War with the 24th Virginia Cavalry, including the Battle of Saint Mary's Church and the First Battle of Deep Bottom, where he was captured. Following the war, he attended the University of Virginia.

In a retrospective discussion of slavery in the South, Jones stated in a letter that "The great slave owners in no manner resembled what I have read of the barons of the fourteenth century who haughtily received the trembling vassals; on the contrary the old Virginia gentlemen were courteous and polite to all classes, not only to the whites, but to the slaves themselves."

Jones was buried at Abingdon Church, following his death in Newport News. Jones had moved to Newport News in 1899, where in addition to serving as mayor built a law practice and was a prominent Baptist.

Preceded by Samuel R. Buxton	Mayor of Newport News; 1908–1912	Succeeded by Bernard B. Semmes
