= Jessie M. Rattley =

American politician

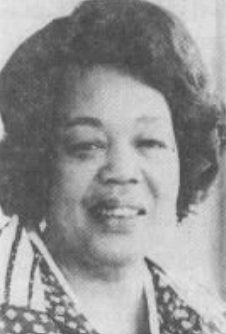

Mayor of Newport News, Virginia
- In office July 1, 1986 – June 30, 1990
- Preceded by: Joseph C. Ritchie
- Succeeded by: Barry E. DuVal

Vice Mayor of Newport News, Virginia
- In office 1976–??

Member of the Newport News City Council
- In office 1970–1990

54th President of the National League of Cities
- In office 1980
- Preceded by: Tom Moody
- Succeeded by: William H. Hudnut III

Personal details
- Born: Jessie Menifield; May 4, 1929 Birmingham, Alabama, U.S.
- Died: March 2, 2001 (aged 71)
- Education: Hampton Institute
- Occupation: teacher, politician
- Website: http://www.nngov.com/

Jessie Menifield Rattley (May 4, 1929 – March 2, 2001) served as the mayor of Newport News, Virginia from 1986 to 1990, the first woman and first African-American to hold the mayorship.

== Life and career ==
Jessie M. Rattley was born to the late Alonzo and Altona Menifield, on May 4, 1929, in Birmingham, Alabama. She attended schools in and graduated from Fairfield High School in 1947, after which she entered Hampton Institute in Hampton, Virginia, graduating with honors in 1951. That same year Mrs. Rattley began her teaching career at Huntington High School in Newport News, Virginia, where she established the business department.

On June 9, 1952, Mrs. Rattley founded the Peninsula Business College, which provided an opportunity for youth and adults to be trained for careers in business. In seeking employment opportunities for her students, she began her lifelong commitment to civil rights and political involvement.

Rattley obtained a degree from distance learning school La Salle Extension University. She worked as an educator.

Rattley was elected to the Newport News City Council in 1970. She was the first Black person and first woman elected to the council, and was re-elected in 1974, 1978, 1982, and 1986. Her election was seen as a major turning point in the civil rights movement for residents in Newport News. Her presence on the City Council led to residents of the city's Southeast community (most of them African-American) seeing funding for their schools and city services increased. She was first made the city's vice-mayor in 1976, and was the first woman and first African-American to the office. She additionally served as president of the National League of Cities in 1980, and was appointed by President Jimmy Carter to a seat on the Intergovernmental Advisory Committee of the U.S. Department of Education.

Rattley was selected mayor of Newport News in 1986. She was the first woman and first Black person to hold the office. During her tenure as mayor, she received some criticism from residents due to her controversial plan to expand HUD and federally subsidized low-income housing into what was the more recently upscale sections of the city, such as Denbigh.

After twenty years on the city council, Ratltley retired in 1990. She would later run for mayor of Newport News in 1996, the first year in which the city held a direct-election of its mayor. She was defeated by Joe Frank.

On August 9, 2005, the Newport News City Hall and the government buildings immediately surrounding it were rededicated the Jessie Menifield Rattley Municipal Center in her honor.

== See also ==
- List of first African-American mayors

Preceded by Joseph C. Ritchie	Mayor of Newport News; 1986–1990	Succeeded by Barry E. DuVal
