= Barry E. DuVal =

American politician

11th Virginia Secretary of Commerce
- In office January 17, 1998 – December 3, 2001
- Governor: Jim Gilmore
- Preceded by: Robert J. Stolle
- Succeeded by: Joshua Lief

Mayor of Newport News, Virginia
- In office July 1, 1990 – June 30, 1996
- Preceded by: Jessie M. Rattley
- Succeeded by: Joe Frank

Personal details
- Born: Barry Eugene DuVal; August 7, 1959 (age 67) Newport News, Virginia, U.S.
- Party: Republican
- Spouse: Cynthia Wermers
- Education: James Madison University

Barry Eugene DuVal (born August 7, 1959) is an American politician from Virginia. He was first elected to the City Council of Newport News, Virginia in 1988, and in 1990 was elected mayor, serving in that role until 1996. He has also served as the president and CEO of the Hampton Roads Partnership, a group that brings together the cities and counties of the Hampton Roads area with local universities and businesses in order to promote the region's economic interests. His service in this field led then-Governor Jim Gilmore to appoint DuVal to be his Secretary of Commerce and Trade, a position he held from 1998 until 2001. After long being considered a Republican frontrunner to succeed Herbert H. Bateman, DuVal surprised many in 2000 when he decided to drop out of the race for Congress in Virginia's 1st congressional district. Jo Ann Davis went on to win the seat. In April 2010, DuVal was named President & CEO of the Virginia Chamber of Commerce.

Political offices
Preceded by Jessie M. Rattley	Mayor of Newport News, Virginia; 1990–1996	Succeeded by Joe Frank
Preceded by Robert J. Stolle	Virginia Secretary of Natural Resources; 1998–2001	Succeeded by Joshua Lief
