= Greenlawn Memorial Park (Newport News, Virginia) =

Historic cemetery in Virginia, United States

- Greenlawn Cemetery
- U.S. National Register of Historic Places
- Virginia Landmarks Register
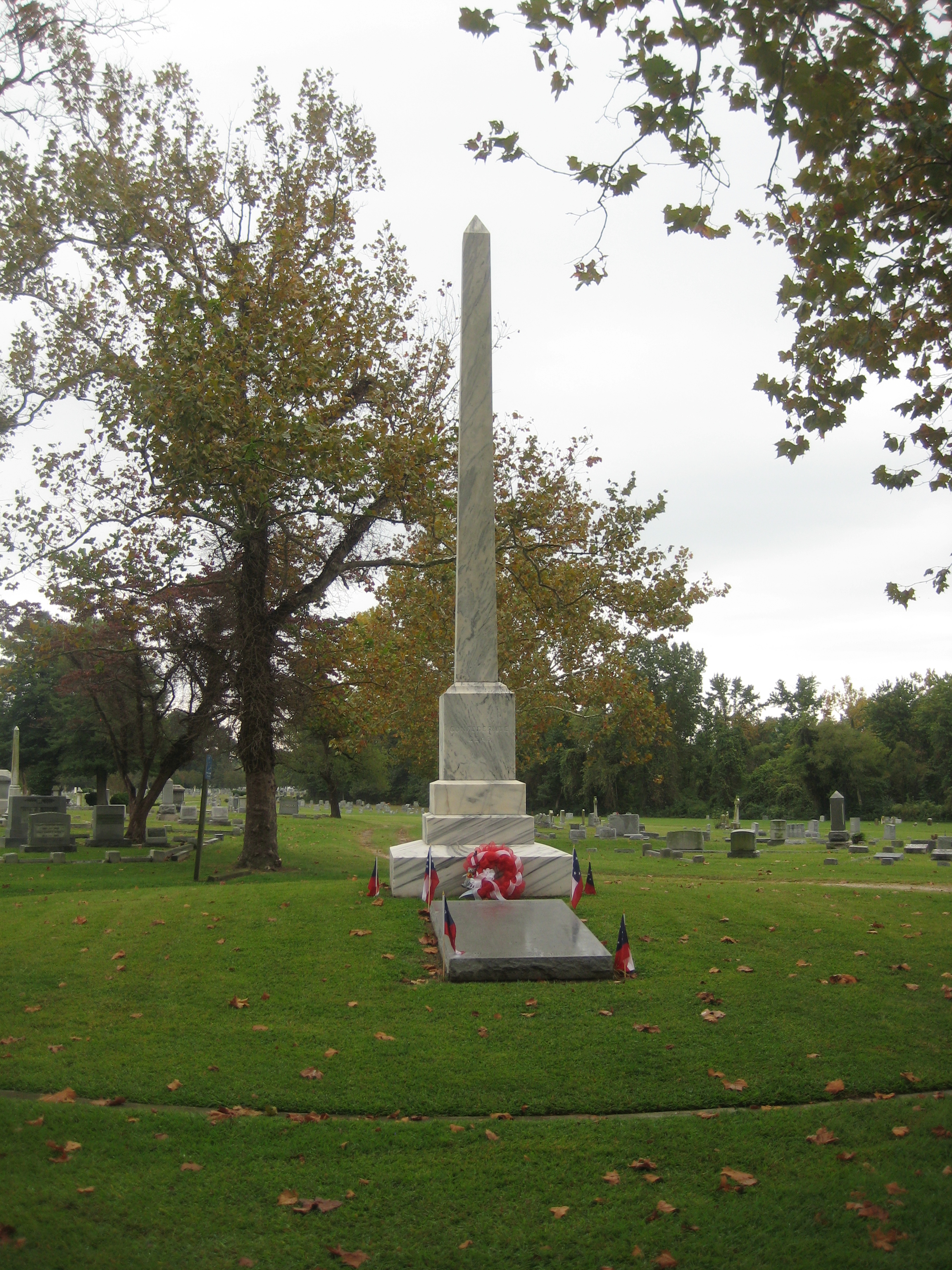
- Camp Butler POW monument at Greenlawn Cemetery

- Location within Virginia Location within the United States
- Location: 2700 Parish Ave., Newport News, Virginia
- Coordinates: 36°59′50″N 76°24′15″W
- Area: 50 acres (20 ha)
- Built: 1900
- Built by: Lawson and Newton; Couper, O.D., Ennis
- NRHP reference No.: 99000139
- VLR No.: 121-0065

Significant dates
- Added to NRHP: February 5, 1999
- Designated VLR: September 14, 1998

Greenlawn Memorial Park, also known as Greenlawn Cemetery, is located at 2700 Parish Avenue, Newport News, Virginia. Greenlawn Memorial Park is a 50-acre (200,000 m^{2}) cemetery located where two natural streams, Mill Dam Creek and Salters Creek, come together. The cemetery has been in continuous operation, serving the Newport News and Hampton, Virginia, since 1888. There are approximately 20,000 burials in the cemetery. Greenlawn Memorial Park is on the National Register of Historic Places.

Greenlawn Cemetery was developed by the Newport News Cemetery Company beginning February 14, 1888. The incorporators were T. H. Gordon, Louis Bremond, I. E. White, Theodore Livezey, E. Clayton, E. B. Smith, T. E. Monis and M. B. Crowell. By the terms of the charter, they were authorized to associate others with them. Walter A. Post, George Benjamin West, Carter M. Braxton, W. B. Livezey, C. B. Nelms and W. J. Nelms were added as associates.

At the center of the cemetery is a 25-foot (7.6 m) obelisk erected in 1900 marking the mass grave of 163 Confederate Prisoners of War. The 163 Confederate soldiers were re-interred there in 1900. These were POWs who died in the nearby Newport News POW camp between April 27, 1865 and July 5, 1865. At the foot of this monument is a granite ledger with the names, rank, state and unit of each soldier. Soldiers from 13 southern states are represented.

The cemetery office building is a 1936 Sears Catalog Home.

Pleasant Shade Cemetery was established adjacent to Greenlawn for African Americans in 1909. It is the resting place of Lightfoot Solomon Michaux and other notables.

== Notable burials ==
- Schuyler Otis Bland (1872–1950): U. S. Congressman from Virginia serving from July 2, 1918 to February 16, 1950.
- Perkins, Robert Walker (1859–1919): member of Virginia House of Delegates, 1894 to 1896.
- Nathaniel Jarrett Webb (1891–1943): member of Virginia House of Delegates, 1936 to 1939.
- One British Commonwealth war grave, of an Army Veterinary Corps Surgeon of World War I.
