= Thomas B. Jones =

American businessman and politician

10th Mayor of Newport News, Virginia
- In office 1926–1930
- Preceded by: Charles C. Smith
- Succeeded by: Harry Reyner

Personal details
- Profession: Politician, businessman

Thomas B. Jones was an American businessman and politician, serving on the city council then becoming mayor of Newport News, Virginia from 1926 to 1930.

| Preceded by Charles C. Smith | Mayor of Newport News; 1926–1930 | Succeeded by Harry Reyner |
