= Allan A. Moss =

Former mayor of Newport News, Virginia, United States

Mayor of Newport News, Virginia
- In office 1898–1904; 1916–1920

Personal details
- Born: December 3, 1854
- Died: 1929 (aged 74–75)

Allan A. Moss (December 3, 1854 – 1929), referred to as A. A. Moss, was the mayor of Newport News, Virginia. He is the only person to date to have served two non-consecutive terms. His first span of office covered three two-year terms, from September 1, 1898, to September 1, 1904. By 1916, the term in office was extended to four years, and he served again from September 1 of that year to September 1, 1920. His terms saw continued growth of the city in its early state (having only been incorporated as an independent city in 1896). He presided over the dedication of the Newport News Victory Arch in 1919.

Preceded by Walter A. Post	Mayor of Newport News; 1898 – 1904	Succeeded by Samuel R. Buxton
Preceded by Bernard B. Semmes	Mayor of Newport News; 1916 – 1920	Succeeded by Philip W. Hiden
