= Harry Reyner =

American politician (1889–1978)

Mayor of Newport News, Virginia
- In office 1930–1932

Personal details
- Born: 1889
- Died: 1978 (aged 88–89)

Harry Reyner (1889–1978) was the mayor of Newport News, Virginia, from 1930 to 1932.

== Biography ==
Before serving as mayor, he was a businessman, starting as a boy, selling pies to workers at the Newport News Shipbuilding & Dry Dock Company. As an adult, he started a business as a ship chandler with his father. He left to fight in World War I, and returned at the war's conclusion to run Associated Charities, which provided assistance to families suffering from the local depression that occurred when the shipyard lost its wartime shipbuilding contracts.

He was first elected to serve on Newport News City Council in 1922. He served one term as mayor, and as mayor he established a pension fund for city employees. He also served four terms as vice-mayor.

== Biography ==
Preceded by Thomas B. Jones	Mayor of Newport News; 1930–1932	Succeeded by Richard W. West
