= List of mayors of Newport News, Virginia =

This is a list of people who have served as mayor of the city of Newport News, Virginia.

Image	Mayor	Term
	Allan A. Moss	July 1896 – November 1896
	Walter A. Post	November 1896 – September 1, 1898
	Allan A. Moss (2nd term)	September 1, 1898 – September 1, 1904
	Samuel R. Buxton	September 1, 1904 – September 1, 1908
	Maryus Jones	September 1, 1908 – September 1, 1912
	Bernard B. Semmes	September 1, 1912 – September 1, 1916
	Allan A. Moss (3rd term)	September 1, 1916 – September 1, 1920
	Philip W. Hiden	1920–1924
	Charles C. Smith	1924–1926
	Thomas B. Jones	1926–1930
	Harry Reyner	1930–1932
	Richard W. West	1932–1936
	B. G. James	1936–1940
	T. Parker Host Sr.	September 3, 1940 – February 13, 1942
	Dr. R. Cowles Taylor	February 16, 1942 – December 20, 1955
	Alfred M. Monfalcone	January 16, 1956 – September 1, 1956
	Robert B. Smith	September 1, 1956 – June 30, 1958
	Oscar J. Brittingham Jr.	July 1, 1958 – June 30, 1962
	Donald M. Hyatt	July 1, 1962 – June 30, 1970
	J. William Hornsby	July 1, 1970 – June 30, 1974
	Harry E. Atkinson	July 1, 1974 – June 30, 1976
	Joseph C. Ritchie	July 1, 1976 – June 30, 1986
	Jessie M. Rattley	July 1, 1986 – June 30, 1990
	Barry E. DuVal	July 1, 1990 – June 30, 1996
	Joe S. Frank	July 1, 1996 – June 30, 2010
	McKinley L. Price	July 1, 2010 – December 31, 2022
	Phillip Jones	January 1, 2023 – present

== See also ==
- Timeline of Newport News, Virginia
- History of Newport News, Virginia
