= McKinley L. Price =

American politician

McKinley L. Price DDS
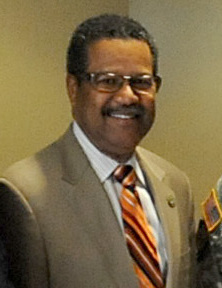

Mayor of Newport News, Virginia
- In office July 1, 2010 – December 31, 2022
- Preceded by: Joe Frank
- Succeeded by: Phillip Jones

Personal details
- Born: McKinley Lenard Price; March 10, 1949 (age 77) Newport News, Virginia, U.S.
- Party: Independent
- Spouse: Valerie Lynn Scott
- Relations: Bobby Scott (brother-in-law)
- Children: 2, including Marcia
- Education: Hampton Institute (B.A.); Howard University (D.D.S.)
- Occupation: Dentist, soldier, politician
- Website: http://www.nngov.com/

Military service
- Allegiance: United States
- Branch/service: United States Army
- Years of service: 1972
- Rank: First lieutenant

McKinley Lenard Price (born March 10, 1949) is an American politician and dentist who served as the mayor of the city of Newport News, Virginia, from 2010 until 2022.

== Career ==
Price graduated from Collis P. Huntington High School in 1967 and Hampton Institute in 1971 before serving in the United States Army as a commissioned officer. He was honorably discharged as a first lieutenant in 1972. Price attended Howard University College of Dentistry, after which he performed a general anesthesia residency at Providence Hospital in Baltimore.

During the COVID-19 pandemic, Price helped by encouraging people to get vaccinated and administering vaccinations himself.

== Personal life ==
Price is a member of Alpha Phi Alpha fraternity. Price was married to Valerie Scott Price until her death in 2025, a retired teacher of thirty years who worked with the Newport News Public School System and the sister of U.S. representative Bobby Scott. Together, they have two children including Marcia, who was elected to the Virginia House of Delegates in 2015.

== See also ==
- Newport News, Virginia
