= Lewis McMurran =

American politician

Lewis McMurran Jr.

Member of the Virginia House of Delegates from the 49th district
- In office January 1948 – January 11, 1978
- Preceded by: Stanley S. Garner
- Succeeded by: Robert C. Scott

Personal details
- Born: Lewis Archer McMurran Jr. April 11, 1914 Newport News, Virginia, U.S.
- Died: July 17, 1989 (aged 75) Newport News, Virginia, U.S.
- Party: Democratic
- Spouse: Edith Lea
- Education: Washington and Lee University

Military service
- Allegiance: United States
- Branch/service: United States Navy
- Years of service: 1942–1946
- Rank: Lieutenant commander
- Battles/wars: World War II
- Awards: Bronze Star Medal

Lewis Archer McMurran Jr. (April 11, 1914 – July 17, 1989) was a member of the Virginia House of Delegates from 1948 until 1977. He represented the City of Newport News, Virginia including representing Warwick County, Virginia before it was consolidated into the City of Newport News.

He was born in Newport News, Virginia on April 11, 1914. He attended Washington and Lee University.

He served in the United States Navy Reserve in World War II rising to the rank of Lieutenant Commander.

He was a Democrat. He was member of the Virginia Delegation to the 1948 Democratic National Convention. He was elected to the Virginia House of Delegates in 1948. He served until 1977. His committee assignments included Federal Relations (Chairman), Chesapeake and Its Tributaries, Counties Cities and Towns, and Roads and Internal Navigation.

Through his work in the Virginia General Assembly, he was instrumental in the founding of Christopher Newport University in 1960 as a two-year branch of the College of William and Mary. In 1985, the college honored him by renaming their Christopher Newport Hall to Lewis A. McMurran, Jr., Hall. In 2010, the original building was demolished, and the current Lewis A. McMurran, Jr. Hall opened in its place.

In 1981 the College of William and Mary awarded Lewis A. McMurran Jr. an honorary degree (LL.D.).

He was a member of the Presbyterian Church and the James River Country Club.

He was the founding chairman of the Jamestown-Yorktown Foundation, the Virginia state agency that operates Jamestown Settlement and the Yorktown Victory Center. As a member of the Virginia House of Delegates he was instrumental in the creation of the Virginia 350th Anniversary Commission in 1954 and served as its chairman. He continued as chairman of the Jamestown-Yorktown Foundation until 1986 and was chairman emeritus at the time of his death in 1989.
