= Harry E. Atkinson =

American politician (1920–2001)

21st Mayor of Newport News, Virginia
- In office July 1, 1974 – July 1, 1976
- Preceded by: J. William Hornsby
- Succeeded by: Joseph C. Ritchie

Personal details
- Born: Harry Eugene Atkinson; February 6, 1920; Newport News, Virginia, U.S.
- Died: June 30, 2001 (aged 81); Newport News, Virginia, U.S.
- Resting place: Quantico National Cemetery, Quantico, Virginia, U.S.
- Political party: Democratic
- Spouse: Lora Catherine Thompson (m. 1943)
- Parent(s): Joseph J Atkinson; Lucille Kempton
- Profession: Politician

Military service
- Allegiance: United States
- Branch/service: United States Marine Corps
- Battles/wars: World War II

Harry Eugene Atkinson (February 6, 1920 – June 30, 2001) was the mayor of Newport News, Virginia from July 1, 1974 to July 1, 1976. His single term in office saw the development of two major landmark buildings in the city's midtown area - the Rouse Tower office complex in 1974 and Newmarket North Mall in 1975. Also completed during Atkinson's term was the first span of the four-lane James River Bridge that would eventually replace the original two-lane bridge.

After serving as mayor, Atkinson led a group of Newport News citizens and the Newport News Historical Commission in creating Potter's Field, a city park on the former site of the Warwick County Poor Farm.

== Notes ==
Preceded by J. William Hornsby	Mayor of Newport News; 1974–1976	Succeeded by Joseph C. Ritchie
