= Virginia Interscholastic Association =

Educational organization in Virginia, US

The Virginia Interscholastic Association was an educational and extracurricular organization formed in 1954 by African American secondary school principals and administrators to provide African American high school students in Virginia with athletic, artistic, academic, and leadership opportunities unavailable to them in segregated schools. From April 1954 to August 1969, over 100 schools participated with the VIA and approximately 40,000 students became members of the organization. Once defunded, the VIA merged with the Virginia High School League (VHSL). The distinguished alumni of the VIA include Mary Winston Jackson, one of the three women featured in the book Hidden Figures by Margot Lee Shetterly and the film of the same title, tennis champion Arthur Ashe, and basketball’s Bobby Dandridge. The VIA served schools that were seen as a "beacon of hope" by many students.

== History ==
=== Formation ===
During a summer conference at Hampton University in 1952, high school principals in Virginia discussed the lack of funding in African American high schools and proposed an organization that would coordinate statewide activities for African American high school students. On April 20, 1954, the VIA was established with the help of a group of African American high school principals in Virginia, Virginia State University, the Department of Education, and the General Assembly of Virginia which funded staff training for teachers and coaches at the request of Virginia State University.

=== Administration ===
The VIA’s Executive Committee “administered activities, schedules, conferences, competitions and appointments. This body consisted of ‘(a) the three groups of member schools; (b) two representatives from the State Department of Education; (c) one member representing Virginia State College; (d) one junior high school representative (Womble).’” A guidance counselor was made available to VIA members to assist them with their socioemotional and academic needs. The coordinated efforts of Virginia State University staff, teachers, coaches, the Department of Education and parents can be attributed with the success of the VIA.

=== Hall of Fame ===
Each year the VIA Heritage Association inducts members to the hall of fame. In 2016, Olympic gold medalist Benita Fitzgerald Mosley was selected. In 2022, seven members were inducted.

=== Archives ===
In May 2023, Billie Jean King and Ilana Kloss made a donation to Teaching for Change to digitize the archives at Virginia State University.

== Programs ==
The VIA organized and administered academics, associations, arts, and athletics programs for its student members.

=== Academics ===
African American high school students participated in academic competitions in mathematics and science, specifically algebra, chemistry, physics, and biology. Virginia State University, Virginia Union University, Hampton, and St. Paul’s College rotated hosting these academic competitions where students completed tests and quizzes. Students had to qualify for these competitions through an often rigorous process.

=== Associations ===
The VIA also granted African American high school students leadership opportunities with Student Council, National Honor Society, and Student Participation Association. These leadership associations carved space for VIA members to learn and hone their leadership skills in a time of oppression and discrimination.

=== Arts ===
In addition to academic and leadership opportunities, the VIA dedicated many of its resources to its arts and athletics programs. VIA members participated and performed in choir, music, and drama competitions and festivals at Virginia State University. Thousands of spectators attended these events where students were judged and awarded for their performances. Member schools often hosted theatrical performances as well.

=== Athletics ===
Through its network of member schools, the VIA created opportunities for African American high school students to compete in football, basketball, baseball, golf, tennis, and track and field. Through its partnerships with Virginia State University, Virginia Union University, Hampton, and St. Paul’s College, the VIA helped African American high school students compete at the collegiate level. Collis P. Huntington High School, for example, won sixteen Virginia Interscholastic Association eastern District titles and seven VIA state championships under coach Thad Madden from 1943 through 1971. Some of the most accomplished athletes in Virginia were members of the VIA. Renowned American tennis player Arthur Ashe (Maggie L. Walker High School) was a member of the VIA.

== Member Schools ==
City or Town	School	Principal	Coach	Group
Blairs	Southside	W.S. Turner	James Earley	Group 1
Charlottesville	Jackson Burley	E.G. Mobley	Robert S. Smith	Group 1
Clarksville	West End	Mrs. D.J. Harris	Lewis Mardhall	Group 1
Danville	John M. Langston	John Byrd, Jr.	Howard Allen	Group 1
Halifax	Halifax County Trg.	W.C. Edwards	C. H. Cage	Group 1
Hampton	George P. Phenix	G.W. Stevenson	S.A. Booker	Group 1
Lawrenceville	James Solomon russell	H.L. Giles	D. F. Thompson	Group 1
Lynchburg	Dunbar	C.W. Seay	Harry Waters	Group 1
Norfolk	Booker T. Washington	Winston Douglas	J. Christian	Group 1
Norfolk	Crestwood	C.A. Wood	R.M. Andrews	Group 1
Newport News	Huntington	W.D. Scales	F.L. Travis	Group 1
Petersburg	Peabody	Clyde S. Scott	J.S. Burton	Group 1
Portsmouth	I.C. Norcom	W.E. Waters	R.T. Smith	Group 1
Rapidan	George W. Carver Reg.	H.S. Fleshmon	UNKNOWN	Group 1
Richmond	Armstrong	G. Peterson, Jr.	M.C. Robinson	Group 1
Richmond	Maggie L. Walker	G.W. Liverpool	A.L. Gardner	Group 1
Roanoke	Lucy Addison	E.L. Phillips	C.L. Price	Group 1
Rock Castle	St. Emma Military Acad.	Rev. A.O’Rourke	W. Clark, Sr.	Group 1
Suffolk	East Suffolk	W.L. Turner	B.L. Davis	Group 1
Warwick	George W. Carver	Homer Hines	W.I. Travis	Group 1
Accomac	Mary N. Smith	F.L. Joynes	J.H. Parsons	Group 2
Alexandria	Parker-Gray	W.H. Pitts	Louis Johnson	Group 2
Amelia	Russell Grove	W.M. Green	A.L. Saunders	Group 2
Arlington	Hoffman-Boston	G.M. Richardson	R.J. Griffin	Group 2
Ashland	John M. Gandy	Mrs. E.D. bundy	G.W. Quarles	Group 2
Bedford	Sussie Gibson	J.I. Jones	Peyton Otey	Group 2
Beverlyville	Julius Rosenwald	J.A. Bennett	UNKNOWN	Group 2
Bowling Green	Union	G.B. Ruffin	A.E. Love	Group 2
Cambria	Christiansburg Inst.	J.F. Banks	T.R. Sease	Group 2
Charlotte	Central	G.H. Binford	L.S. Oxendine	Group 2
Chester	Carver	W.A. Brown	B.Hayes, Jr.	Group 2
Courtland	Southampton Co. Trg.	C.W. Womble	Cohen Cosby	Group 2
Dendron	L.P. Jackson	B.T. Potent	UNKNOWN	Group 2
Dillwyn	Carter G. Woodson	G.F. Harris	A.D. Wilson	Group 2
Dinwiddie	Southside	R.W. Watson	W.H. Morgan	Group 2
Disputanta	Disputanta Training	W.H. Gillard	G.J. Hayes	Group 2
Emporia	Edward W. Wyatt	F.H. Smith	W.C. Washington	Group 2
Farmville	Robert R. Moton	S.F. Griffin	W.H. Truman	Group 2
Fieldale	George W. Carver	N.E. Johnson	Reginald Leo	Group 2
Franklin	Hayden	S.P. Morton	Leon Armstead	Group 2
Fredericksburg	Walker-Grant	J.G. Johnson	P.H. Gunning	Group 2
Glen Allen	Virginia Randoplh	U.C. Oliver	M.L. Glover	Group 2
Gretna	Northside	Albert G. Tippitt	B.L. Dix	Group 2
Louisa	A.G. Richardson	R.E. Phanelson	C.L. Conyors	Group 2
Machipongo	Northampton County	W.H. Smith	B.E. Moss	Group 2
Manassas	Manassas Regional	C.N. Bennett	P.W. Ellis	Group 2
Martinsville	Albert Harris	J.E. Turner	R.M. Cole	Group 2
Merrifield	Luther P. Jackson	T.M. Williams	G.W. Felton	Group 2
Norfolk	Princess Anne Co. Trg.	J.V. Boykin	Judge Goss	Group 2
Nottoway	L.H. Foster	J.B. Woodson	D.L. Maynard	Group 2
Portsmouth	Our Lady of Victory	A.F. Pereira	UNKNOWN	Group 2
Roanes	Thomas C. Walker	H.E. Johnson	W.J. Whitehead	Group 2
Rocky Mount	Franklin Co. Trg.	C.L. Atkins	S.M. Hawkins	Group 2
Rustburg	Cambell County	O.J. Duncan, Jr.	H.F. Pettiford	Group 2
Ruthville	Ruthville	E.E. Scott	E.E. Scott	Group 2
Salem	Carver	C.D. Harmon	I. Cannaday	Group 2
Shipman	Nelson County Trg.	R.M. Thompson	UNKNOWN	Group 2
Snell	John J. Wright	A.L. Scott	M. Morbrey	Group 2
Smithfield	Isle of Wight Trg.	C.M. Gillis	M. Law	Group 2
South Hill	East End	E.N. Taliaforro	O.L. Sherill, Jr.	Group 2
South Norfolk	George W. Carver	C.S. Brabble	P.E. Parham	Group 2
Suffolk	Booker T. Washington	J.F. Peele, Jr.	L. Dunovant	Group 2
Templeman	A.T. Johnson	L.A. Richardson	J.A. Thompkins	Group 2
Vitoria	Lunenburg	K.P. Evans	C.M. Jones	Group 2
Warrenton	William C. Taylor	C.P. hazzard	C.I. Craig	Group 2
Waverly	Sussex Co. Trg.	J.I. Bridgers	C.D. Jackson	Group 2
Williamsburg	Bruton Heights	D.J. Montague	Ruell Blair	Group 2
Appomattox	Carver-Price	Richard Patrick	N.H. Miller	Group 3
Barryville	Johnson-Williams	L.D. Harding	L.D. Harding	Group 3
Bluefield	Tazewell County	J.A. Hubbard	E.R. Coleman	Group 3
Clifton Forge	Jefferson	W.C. Hill	UNKNOWN	Group 3
Covington	Watson	C.G. Brown	UNKNOWN	Group 3
Cumberland	Luther P. Jackson	J.B. Pervell	UNKNOWN	Group 3
Edge Hill	Ralphe Bunche	L.C. Bland	T.R. Butler	Group 3
Harrisonburg	Lucy F. Simms	A.M. Stitt	B.M. Hinton	Group 3
Kolland	Nasemond County	H.E. Howell	E.C. Richards	Group 3
Hopewell	Carter G. Woodson	B.F. Epps	R.J. Haynes	Group 3
Irwin	Central	C.A. Pennington	M.N. Lewis	Group 3
King and Queen	King and Queen Central	G.W. Robinson	B.D. Jones	Group 3
King William	Hamilton-Holmes	S.D. Womack	H.A. Townes	Group 3
Leesburg	Douglas	S.M. Sydnow	UNKNOWN	Group 3
Lexington	Lylburn Downing	U.B. Broadneaux	G.C. Singfield	Group 3
Luray	Andrew Jackson, Jr.	S.H. Dodson	Kirk N. Gaskin	Group 3
Mathews	Thomas Hunter	J.M. Brooks	A.R. Cooley	Group 3
Norton	Southside	G.N. Carr	UNKNOWN	Group 3
Palmyra	S.C. Abrams	W.E. Friend	E.L. Edwards	Group 3
Powhatan	Pochontas	G.W. Ransome	E. Finney	Group 3
Quinton	G.W. Watkins	G.W. Watkins	UNKNOWN	Group 3
Staunton	Booker T. Washington	A.R. Ware	J.D. Hicks	Group 3
Stormont	St. Clare Walker	C.I. Thurston	J.D. Madison	Group 3
Stuart	Patrick Central	P.H. Stone. Jr.	S.L. Lester	Group 3
Tapahannock	Essex County	P.B. Parks	F.P. Holmes	Group 3
Warsaw	Richmond County	W.H. Mackey	R.P. Young	Group 3
Waynesboro	Rosenwald	E.G. Wood	K. Booker	Group 3
White Stone	A.T. Wright	P.G. Lewis	UNKNOWN	Group 3
Winchester	Douglas	K.N. Gaskins	E.K. Barksdale	Group 3
Yorktown	James Weldon Johnson	R.L. Rice	W.M. Wallace	Group 3
