= Philip W. Hiden =

American politician (1872–1936)

Personal details
- Born: Philip Wallace Hiden; April 5, 1872 Orange, Virginia, U.S.
- Died: October 25, 1936 (aged 64) Newport News, Virginia, U.S.
- Occupation: Businessman
- Known for: Mayor of Newport News, Virginia

Philip Wallace Hiden (April 5, 1872 – October 25, 1936) was a businessman and mayor of Newport News, Virginia.

Hiden, whose earlier ancestors from Watford, England used the spelling Hyden, was born in Orange, Virginia. He married Martha Woodroof (1883–1959), daughter of Jesse Alphonso Woodroof and Susan (Graves) Woodroof. She was, in her own right, a researcher, genealogist, and historian who established the city library system's Virginia collection. The couple had three children.

Preceded by Allan A. Moss	Mayor of Newport News; 1920–1924	Succeeded by Charles C. Smith
