= Joseph C. Ritchie =

American politician

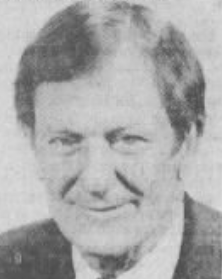

Mayor of Newport News, Virginia
- In office 1976–1986
- Deputy: Lorraine Grillo
- Preceded by: Harry E. Atkinson
- Succeeded by: Jessie M. Rattley

Joseph C. Ritchie was the mayor of Newport News, Virginia for ten years, from July 1, 1976 to June 30, 1986. Ritchie was the first Republican mayor for the city; in fact, his election to City Council in 1970 was the first time a Republican had been chosen to serve as a Councilman. Joe entered the political arena winning election to the Newport News City Council in 1970 and again in 1976, 1980, and 1984. In 1976, Council voted him to the position of Mayor, a role in which he served for 10 years.

Ritchie's decade as mayor saw significant growth in the city. Major improvements to the infrastructure of the city were carried out during his terms. Ritchie himself considered the lowering of tax rates, a cause with which he was particularly involved in, to be key to growth in the city during this time. In 1982 Ritchie signed a "sister city" agreement with the city of Neyagawa, Osaka, Japan.

He was a prime mover in the initiation of City Center at Oyster Point in 2000 and was known for his strong support for economic development, including the growth and success of the Oyster Point Office Park. Joe was instrumental in the City being selected for the Army Air Forces Exchange Service 1 million square foot distribution center at Oakland industrial Park. He also played a key role in bringing Canon Virginia to Newport News.

After serving as mayor, Ritchie returned to his career as a contractor, as owner and CEO of the Ritchie-Curbow Construction Company. The company is responsible for building several sites of interest in the Hampton Roads area. Ritchie is also a managing member of Newport News Town Center, LLC, responsible for the managing of the city's new City Center at Oyster Point district. In addition, Ritchie was a charter member of the Virginia Company Bank and served on its board of directors, executive committee, and loan committee.

Joseph Carlton Ritchie was born March 7, 1930, to John Reynolds and Rose Agnes Ritchie in Newport News, Virginia. He died on August 17, 2025, in Williamsburg, Virginia, at the age of 95.

Joe attended John W. Daniel Elementary School, Newport News High School, the NASA Apprentice School, Newport News Shipbuilding Design School, University of Virginia Extension, and Armed Forces Extension School.

He served two years active duty in the United States Marine Corps from October 1951 to October 1953 during the Korean War with VMF-223 at MCAS Cherry Point. He was employed at Newport News Shipbuilding in piping design and at Dow Chemical in project engineering before entering the business world in 1973 with Gary D. Curbow, forming Ritchie-Curbow Construction Company.

Preceded by Harry E. Atkinson	Mayor of Newport News; 1976–1986	Succeeded by Jessie M. Rattley
