= Death in Custody Reporting Act of 2013 =

U.S. bill about reporting deaths of prisoners

- Long title: To encourage States to report to the Attorney General certain information regarding the deaths of individuals in the custody of law enforcement agencies, and for other purposes.
- Announced in: the 113th United States Congress
- Sponsored by: Rep. Robert C. "Bobby" Scott (D, VA-3)
- Number of co-sponsors: 1

Codification
- Acts affected: Omnibus Crime Control and Safe Streets Act of 1968
- U.S.C. sections affected: 42 U.S.C. § 3791, 42 U.S.C. § 3750 et seq.
- Agencies affected: United States Congress, United States Department of Justice

Legislative history
- Introduced in the House as H.R. 1447 by Rep. Robert C. "Bobby" Scott (D, VA-3) on April 9, 2013; Committee consideration by United States House Committee on the Judiciary, United States House Judiciary Subcommittee on Crime, Terrorism, Homeland Security and Investigations

The Death in Custody Reporting Act of 2013 (H.R. 1447) is a bill that would require the United States Department of Justice to collect data from U.S. states and territories about the deaths of prisoners in their custody. States and territories would face monetary penalties for noncompliance. The bill would also require federal agencies to report on the deaths of prisoners in their custody. The Death in Custody Reporting Act of 2013 was introduced into the United States House of Representatives during the 113th United States Congress.

== Background ==
In 2000, Congress passed the Death in Custody Reporting Act of 2000 (H.R. 1800; Public Law 106-297) which created a program requiring states to report on the deaths and circumstances of those deaths of any prisoners in their custody. The Bureau of Justice Statistics continued to collect this information even after the law expired in 2006. This bill would continue that program and extend it to federal prisoners. It would also require the Attorney General to analyze the data and try to find a way to reduce those deaths, then report on it to Congress.

In 2011, 885 prisoners died in local custody, mostly due to natural causes such as cancer or heart disease. This was the lowest number of deaths over the twelve years that they were counted in this program.

== Provisions of the bill ==
This summary is based largely on the summary provided by the Congressional Research Service, a public domain source.

The Death in Custody Reporting Act of 2013 would require states that receive certain criminal justice assistance grants to report to the Attorney General on a quarterly basis certain information regarding the death of any person who is detained, arrested, en route to incarceration, or incarcerated in state or local facilities or a boot camp prison. The bill would impose penalties on states that fail to comply with such reporting requirements.

The Death in Custody Reporting Act of 2013 would require the head of each federal law enforcement agency to report to the Attorney General annually certain information regarding the death of any person who: (1) is detained or arrested by any officer of such agency (or by any state or local law enforcement officer for purposes of a federal law enforcement operation); or (2) is en route to be incarcerated or detained, or is incarcerated or detained, at any federal correctional facility or federal pretrial detention facility located within the United States or any other facility pursuant to a contract with or used by such agency.

The bill would require the Attorney General to study such information and report on means by which it can be used to reduce the number of such deaths.

The information states would be required to provide includes mostly demographic data. States would need to indicate the prisoner's name, gender, race, ethnicity, and age. The circumstances surrounding the prisoner's death would also have to be reported.

== Procedural history ==
The Death in Custody Reporting Act of 2013 was introduced into the United States House of Representatives on April 9, 2013 by Rep. Robert C. "Bobby" Scott (D, VA-3). It was referred to the United States House Committee on the Judiciary and the United States House Judiciary Subcommittee on Crime, Terrorism, Homeland Security and Investigations. On December 4, 2013, the full Committee held a Consideration and Mark-up session. They then order the bill to be reported by voice vote. On December 6, 2013, Majority Leader Eric Cantor's office announced that H.R. 1447 would be considered under a suspension of the rules during the week of December 9, 2013.

== Debate and discussion ==
Rep. Bob Goodlatte spoke in favor of the bill at the House Judiciary Committee markup session, saying that "the collection of this data will help Federal, State, and local governments examine the relationship between deaths in custody and the proper management of jail and prison facilities."

Rep. John Conyers also spoke in favor of the bill at the markup session, arguing that the greatest powers of the government is to take away a citizen's freedom. As a result, "the government maintains an important obligation to treat those in its custody in a fair way and to refrain from doing them harm, and it is our role and in the interest of all our citizens that we maintain transparency with respect to the treatment of prisoners and others held in government custody."

== See also ==
- List of bills in the 113th United States Congress
- Federal law enforcement in the United States
