= Semmes (surname) =

Semmes is a surname. Notable people with it include:

- Albert G. Semmes (1810–1883), American lawyer and politician
- Alexander Alderman Semmes (1825–1885), American Civil War Union Navy commodore
- Benedict J. Semmes, Jr. (1913–1994), United States Navy admiral
- Benedict Joseph Semmes (1789–1863), American politician and Maryland State Senator
- Bernard B. Semmes, a mayor of Newport News, Virginia
- Paul Jones Semmes (1815–1863), a banker, businessman, and a Confederate General in the American Civil War
- Raphael Semmes (1809–1877), an officer in both the U.S. Navy and Confederate Navy
- Stephen Semmes, a Professor of Mathematics at Rice University
- Thomas J. Semmes (1824–1899), a member of the Louisiana state legislature
- T. Semmes Walmsley (1889–1942), Mayor of New Orleans
