= Phillip Jones (politician) =

American politician (born 1989)

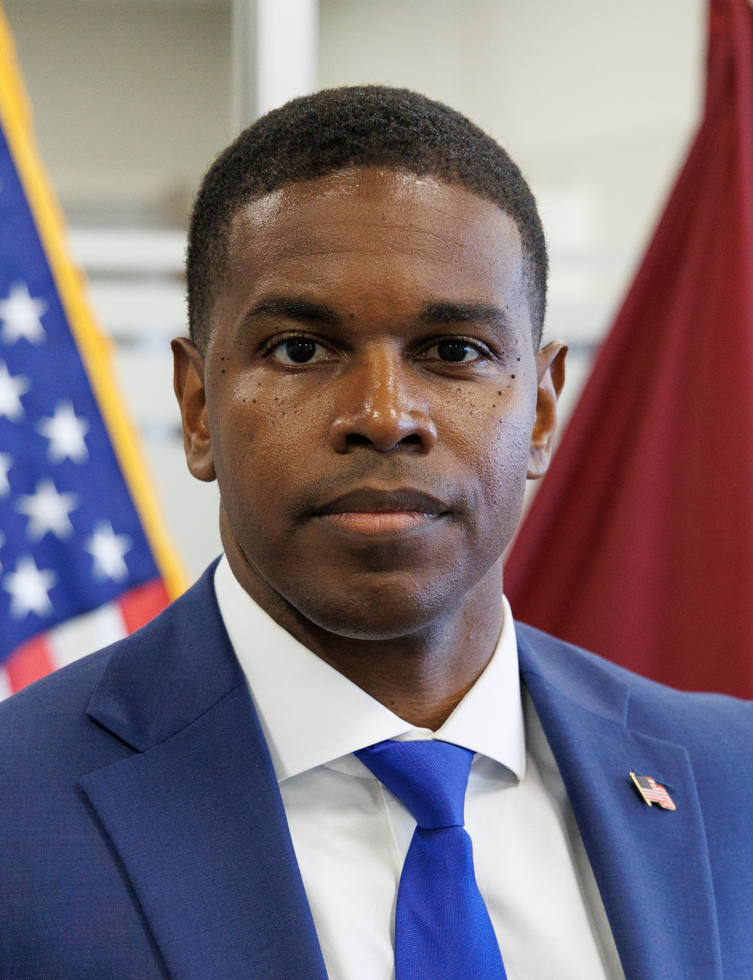
- Jones in 2024

27th Mayor of Newport News, Virginia
- Incumbent
- Assumed office January 1, 2023 (Note: Jones' term officially began on January 1 although he was not sworn in until January 10.)
- Preceded by: McKinley L. Price

Personal details
- Born: Phillip Damon Jones; September 19, 1989 (age 37)
- Party: Democratic
- Spouse: Jamila Wynter
- Education: United States Naval Academy, Harvard University (MBA, MPP)
- Occupation: Politician, Consultant, Marine
- Website: https://phillipjones.com

Military service
- Allegiance: United States
- Branch/service: United States Marine Corps
- Years of service: 2012–2018 (active); 2018–present (reserves)
- Rank: Major

Phillip Damon Jones (born September 19, 1989) is an American politician and the current mayor of Newport News, Virginia. He is the 27th and youngest directly elected mayor of the Virginia city. (Note: Mayor Barry Duval was the youngest mayor of the Virginia City, but was made mayor by the City Council rather than an election.)

== Early life and career ==
Jones was born on September 19, 1989, at Kadena Air Force Base in Okinawa, Japan. His father, Daryl Jones, was an F-15 pilot, and his mother, Martha Stevenson-Jones was a KC-135 navigator in the United States Air Force. When Jones was a teenager, the family moved to Hampton Roads, Virginia. He graduated from Hampton Christian Academy in 2008. Jones attended the United States Naval Academy in Annapolis, Maryland, on a vice presidential nomination. In 2012, he graduated with a Bachelor of Science degree in history and a commission in the United States Marine Corps.

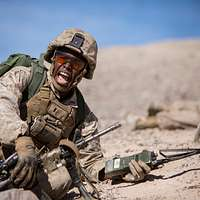
U.S. Marine Corps 1st Lt. Phillip D. Jones during 2015 training exercise.

Jones served six years as a Marine Corps infantry officer with 1st Battalion, 8th Marines. He currently serves as a Major in the United States Marine Corps Reserves.

After leaving the military, Jones attended Harvard University, receiving a Master of Business Administration (MBA) and a Master of Public Policy (MPP) from Harvard Business School and Harvard Kennedy School. After graduate school, Jones joined Bain & Company, focusing on social impact and public sector strategy.

== Political record ==
Jones was elected to office on Nov 8, 2022, winning 40% of the vote over three members of the city council.

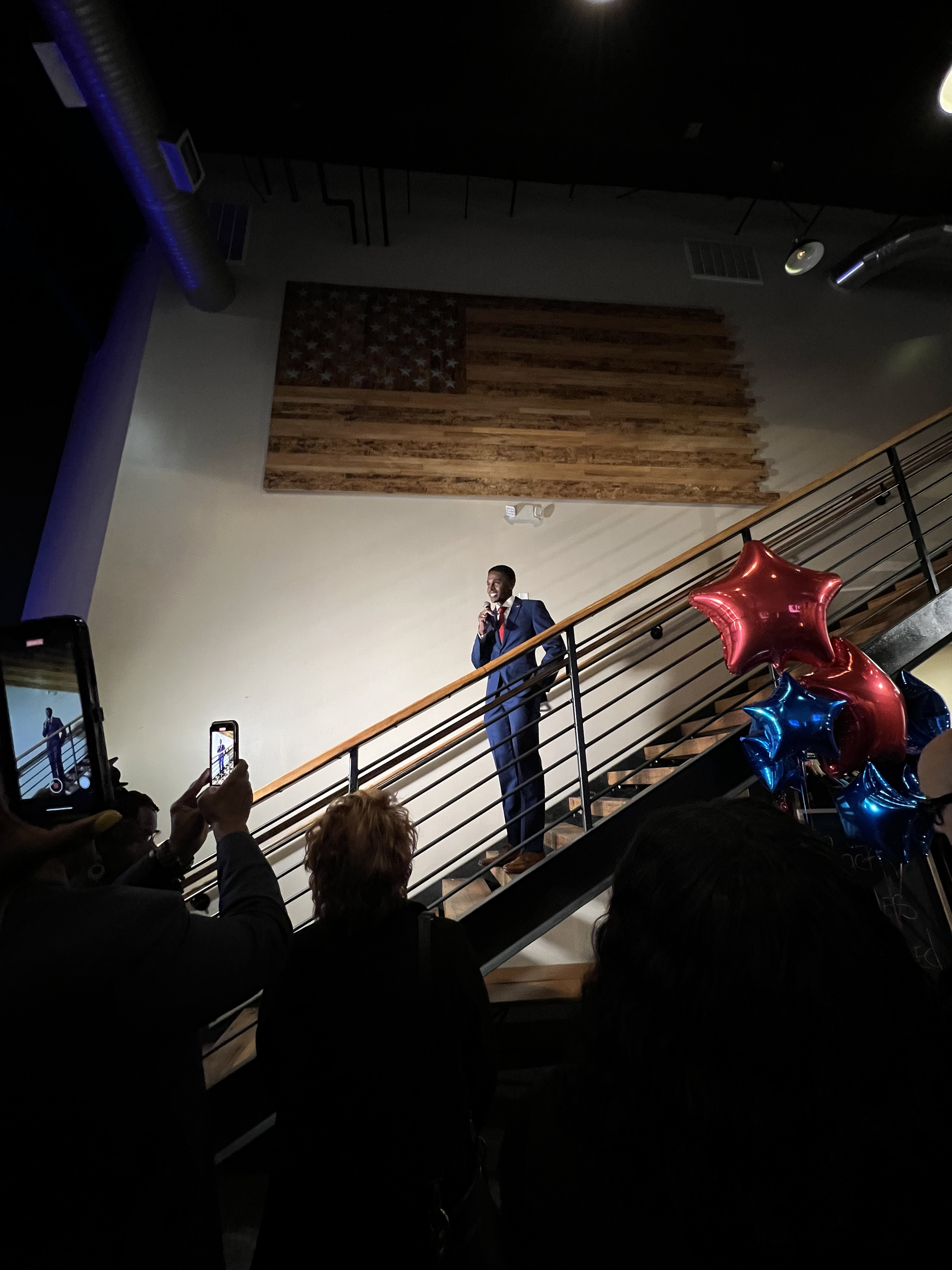
Newport News Mayor Phillip Jones On Election Night Giving Acceptance Speech

During his election, he was endorsed by Governor Terry McAuliffe and State Senator Mamie Locke. Prior to becoming mayor, Jones was a member of the Newport News Planning Commission for two years. He was sworn into office on January 10, 2023.

2022 Newport News, Virginia, mayoral election
Candidate	Votes	%
Phillip Jones	19,441	40.29%
Saundra Cherry	7,868	16.31%
Dave Jenkins	11,637	24.12%
Tina Vick	9,055	18.77%
Total votes	48,001	100%

== Mayor of Newport News ==
Prior to his official first day in office, Jones was invited to the White House as part of a bi-partisan group of newly elected mayors. There he met with President Joe Biden and members of the Biden-Harris Administration, including Secretary of Labor Martin J. Walsh, Secretary of Housing and Urban Development Marcia Fudge, and Secretary of Transportation Pete Buttigieg.

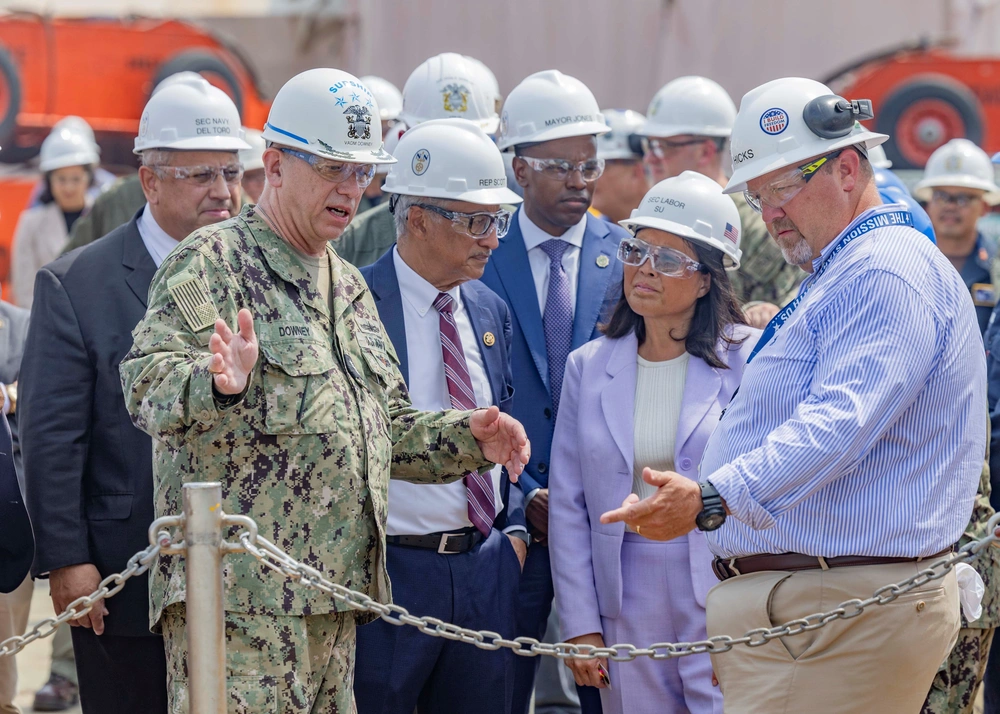
Secretary of the Navy Carlos Del Toro visits the Newport News Shipbuilding Yard with Mayor Phillip Jones, Congressman Bobby Scott (VA-03) and Acting Secretary of Labor Julie Su

=== Richneck shooting ===
On January 6, 2023, a six-year-old student at Richneck Elementary School in Newport News shot his teacher, Abby Zwerner, while inside their classroom. The shooting was the first school shooting of 2023 and prompted major discussions around gun control and violence in the United States. (The shooting occurred four days before Jones was sworn in.) During a press conference updating reporters, Jones called the incident a “red flag for the country.”

=== Bloomberg mayors program ===
In July 2023, Jones was selected as one of 40 mayors from around the world and 27 United States Mayors for the seventh class of the Bloomberg Harvard City Leadership Initiative.

=== Vice presidential visit ===
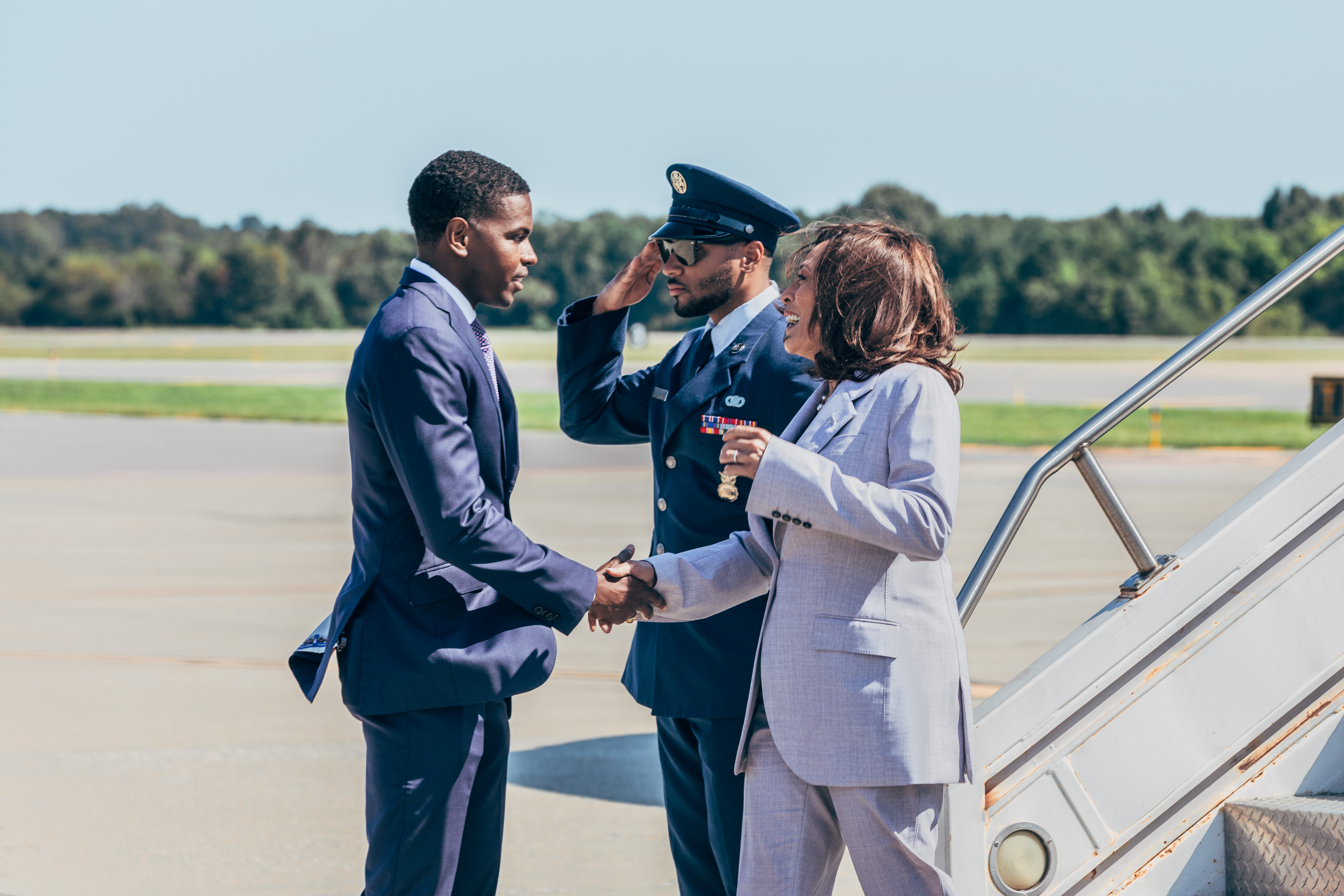
Jones and Harris prior the Vice President's visit at Hampton University for her “Fight for Our Freedoms College Tour"

Vice President Kamala Harris began her "Fight For Our Freedoms" college tour with a stop at Hampton University and was greeted at the Newport News/Williamsburg International Airport by Jones.

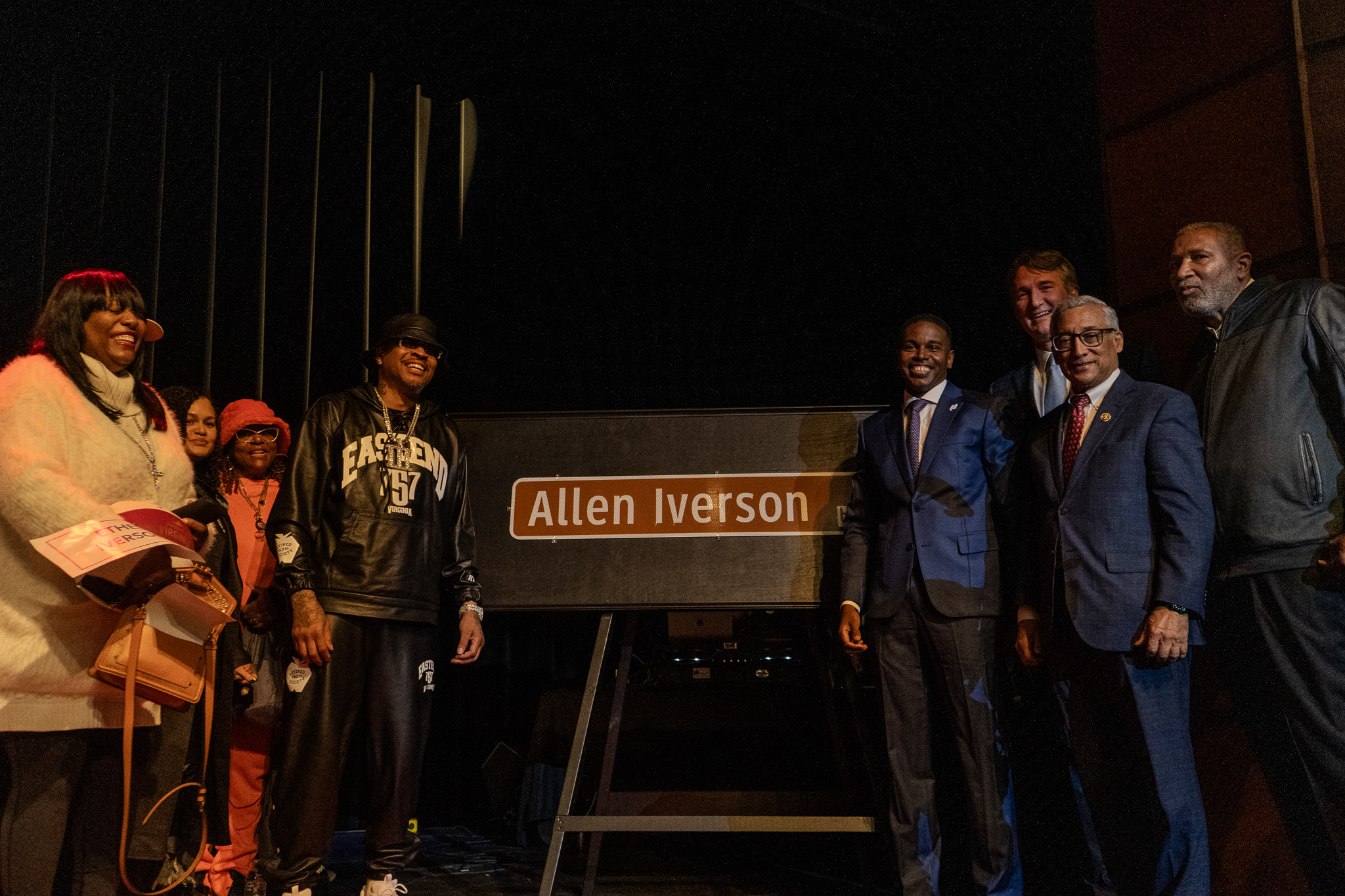
Iverson, Jones and Youngkin at the street renaming ceremony.

=== Allen Iverson Street Naming ===
Jones gave opening remarks at the street renaming ceremony for former NBA player Allen Iverson. Iverson, who grew up in the Hampton Roads area and attended Bethel High School, was named an NBA All-Star 11 times during his 14 season career in the professional basketball league. In February 2024, the Newport News city council officially renamed a section of 16th Street that stretches from Wickham Avenue to Walnut Avenue “Allen Iverson Way.” “He’s one of our native sons and we’re proud to honor him today,” Jones said at the ceremony. March 5 was also proclaimed Allen Iverson Day in the city by Gov. Glenn Youngkin.

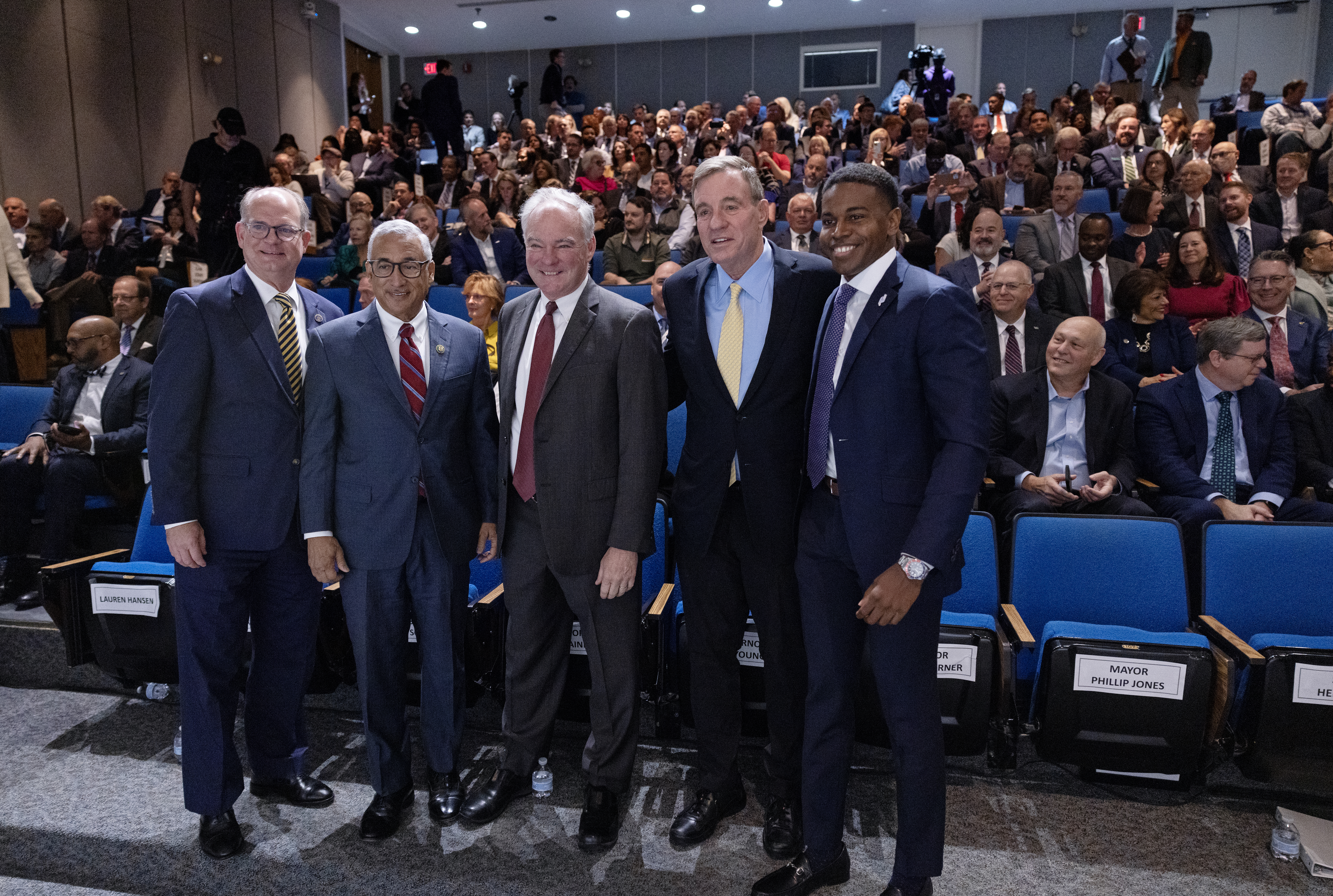
Members of Virginia Governor’s office, The Friends of Jefferson Lab, staff, users, and employees gathered together for an announcement of the approval of the High Performance Data Facility

=== Jefferson Lab updates ===
During Jones' first year in office, the Thomas Jefferson National Accelerator Facility, also known as Jefferson Lab, was chosen to manage a national project for centralizing research data. In collaboration with the Lawrence Berkeley National Laboratory in California, the High Performance Data Facility Hub will have its main infrastructure reside at Jefferson Lab.

“The city has been committed to supporting Jefferson Lab’s robust educational and scientific offerings since 1985,” Jones said at an event announcing the news. "We have directly invested more than $64 million to ensure Jefferson Lab’s success and growth.”

=== Pronouncements ===
On June 1, 2023, Jones officially recognized June as Pride Month and announced the city's first Pride festival.

== Personal life ==
Jones is a member of the Omega Psi Phi (ΩΨΦ) fraternity. He is married to Jamila Wynter, M.D.
