= Samuel R. Buxton =

American politician (1874–1951)

Personal details
- Born: February 10, 1874
- Died: November 9, 1951 (aged 77)
- Occupation: American politician, Mayor of Newport News, Virginia

Samuel Roland Buxton (February 10, 1874 – November 9, 1951) was the mayor of Newport News, Virginia from September 1, 1904 to September 1, 1908. He was born in Jackson, North Carolina and attended Wake Forest College. Later, he was instrumental, as part of a "Central Community Committee," of attracting interest in a memorial arch to recognize American troops returning home from the First World War. This arch became the Newport News Victory Arch.

His son, Samuel R. Buxton, Jr., served as a judge in the Newport News Circuit Court from 1968 to 1977. He died at his daughter's home in El Paso, Texas in 1951.

Preceded by Allan A. Moss	Mayor of Newport News; 1898–1904	Succeeded by Col. Maryus Jones
