= Richard W. West =

American politician

Mayor of Newport News
- In office 1932–1936
- Preceded by: Harry Reyner
- Succeeded by: B. G. James

Richard W. West was an American politician. He was the mayor of Newport News, Virginia from 1932 to 1936.

Preceded by Harry Reyner	Mayor of Newport News; 1932–1936	Succeeded by B. G. James
