= Joe Frank (politician) =

American politician (1942–2022)

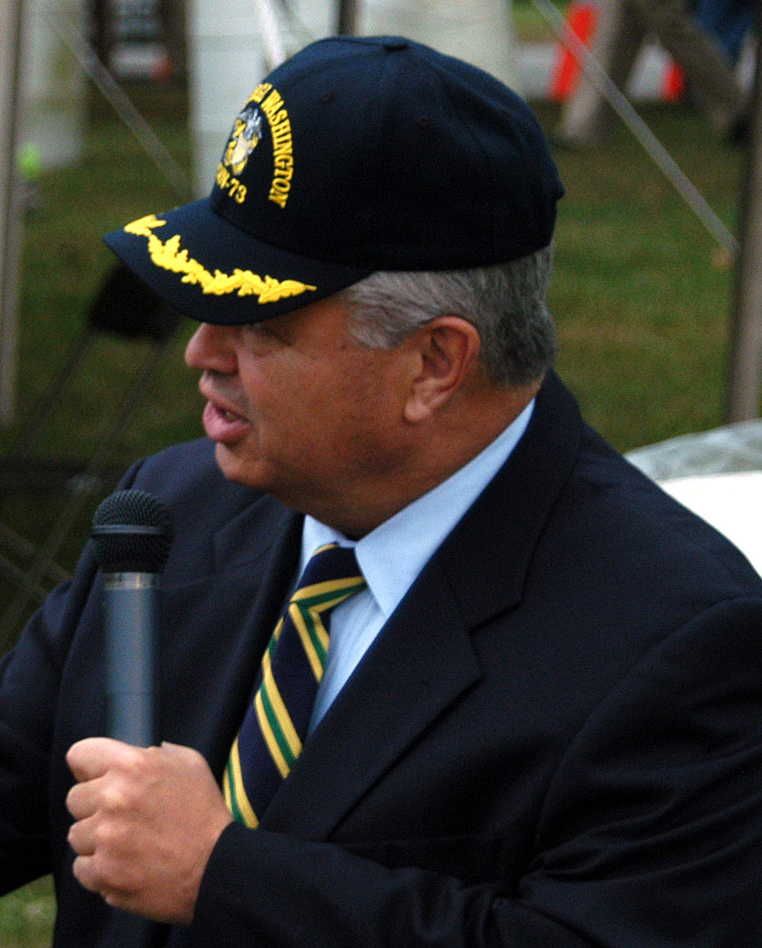
- Frank in 2005

Mayor of Newport News, Virginia
- In office July 1, 1996 – June 30, 2010
- Preceded by: Barry E. DuVal
- Succeeded by: McKinley L. Price

Personal details
- Born: Joe Samuel Frank; November 14, 1942 Newport News, Virginia, U.S.
- Died: October 27, 2022 (aged 79) Newport News, Virginia, U.S.
- Party: Democratic
- Spouse: Jane Susan (died 2021)
- Education: University of Virginia

Joe Samuel Frank (November 14, 1942 – October 27, 2022) was an American politician who was the mayor of Newport News, Virginia. A native of Newport News, and a lawyer, he was first elected mayor for the term starting July 1, 1996. He was re-elected in May 1998, 2002, and 2006. His last term expired on June 30, 2010. He was the first directly elected mayor in the history of the city. Frank was an Eagle Scout and was awarded the Distinguished Eagle Scout Award in 2009.

Frank was a father and grandfather. He died at his home in Newport News on October 27, 2022, at the age of 79.

| Preceded by Barry E. DuVal | Mayor of Newport News; 1996-2010 | Succeeded by McKinley Price |
