= Bobby Scott (politician) =

American politician and lawyer (born 1947)

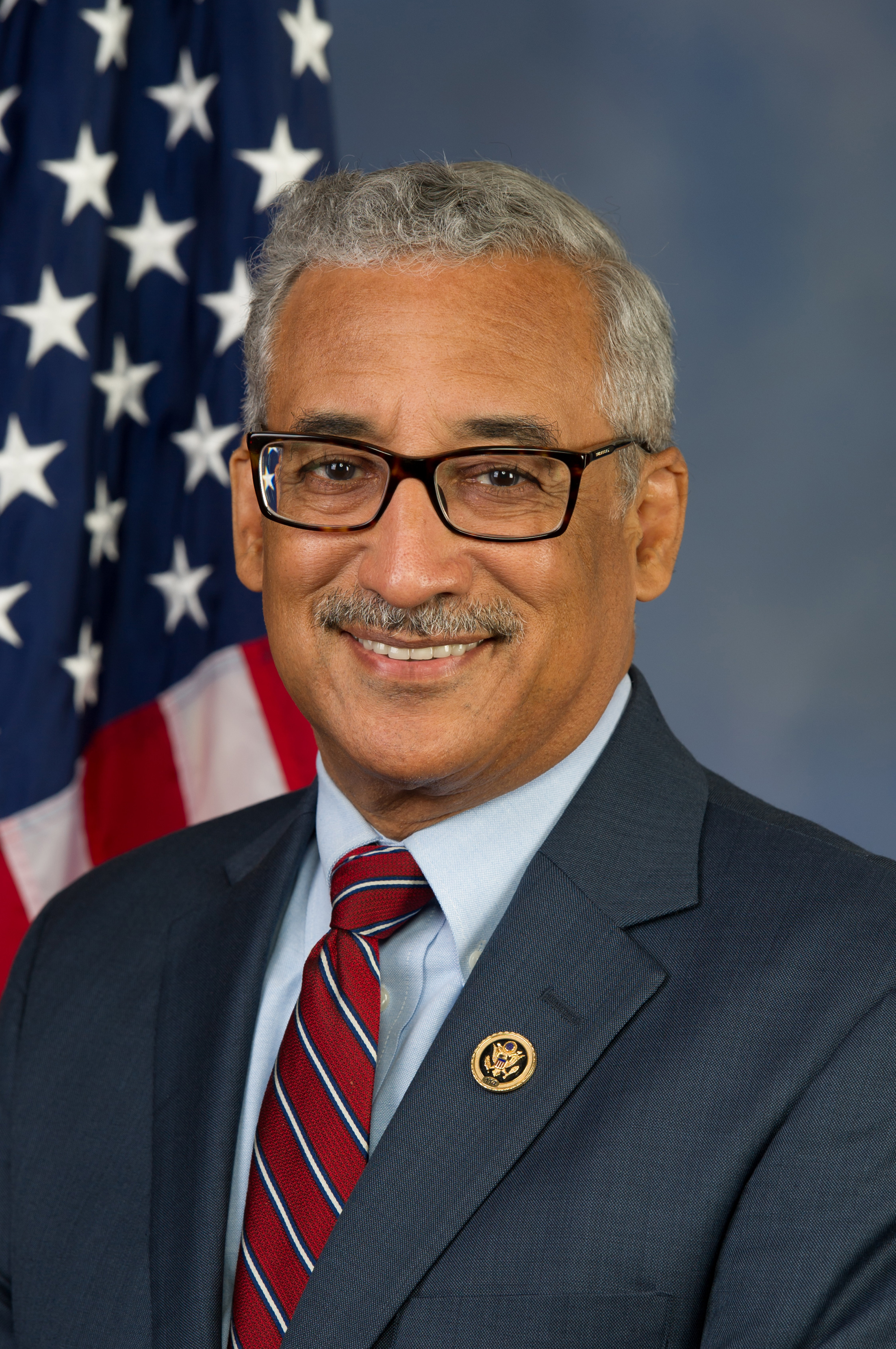

Ranking Member of the House Education Committee
- Incumbent
- Assumed office January 3, 2023
- Preceded by: Virginia Foxx
- In office January 3, 2015 – January 3, 2019
- Preceded by: George Miller
- Succeeded by: Virginia Foxx

Chair of the House Education Committee
- In office January 3, 2019 – January 3, 2023
- Preceded by: Virginia Foxx
- Succeeded by: Virginia Foxx

Member of the U.S. House of Representatives from Virginia's 3rd district
- Incumbent
- Assumed office January 3, 1993
- Preceded by: Thomas Bliley

Member of the Virginia Senate from the 2nd district
- In office January 12, 1983 – January 3, 1993
- Preceded by: Herbert Bateman
- Succeeded by: Henry Maxwell

Member of the Virginia House of Delegates
- In office January 11, 1978 – January 12, 1983 Serving with Ted Morrison, Alan Diamonstein
- Preceded by: Lewis McMurran
- Succeeded by: Mary A. R. Marshall
- Constituency: 49th district (1978–1982); 48th district (1982–1983)

Personal details
- Born: Robert Cortez Scott; April 30, 1947 (age 79) Washington, D.C., U.S.
- Party: Democratic
- Relatives: Marcia Price (niece); McKinley L. Price (brother-in-law)
- Education: Harvard University (BA); Boston College (JD)
- Website: House website Campaign website

Military service
- Branch/service: United States Army; Army Reserve
- Years of service: 1970–1973 (guard); 1973–1976 (reserve)
- Unit: Massachusetts Army National Guard
- Scott's voice Scott supporting the Pregnant Workers Fairness Act. Recorded May 14, 2021

Robert Cortez Scott (born April 30, 1947) is an American politician and lawyer serving as the U.S. representative for Virginia's 3rd congressional district since 1993. A member of the Democratic Party, he is the dean of Virginia's congressional delegation, a position he has held since 2019. He previously shared the deanship with Bob Goodlatte until the latter's retirement that year. He is also the first Filipino American voting member of Congress. His district serves most of the majority-Black precincts of Hampton Roads, including all of the independent cities of Norfolk, Newport News (where he resides), Hampton and Portsmouth, and parts of the independent city of Chesapeake. From 2019 to 2023, Scott was chair of the House Education and Labor Committee. He has been ranking member on that committee since 2023.

== Early life, education and legal career ==
Scott was born in Washington, D.C., and grew up in Newport News, Virginia. He is of African American and Filipino descent. His father, Charles Waldo Scott, was a pioneering African American surgeon and in 1952 became the first African American appointed to the Newport News school board in the 20th century. Scott's mother Mae Hamlin-Scott, a graduate in chemistry of the University of Michigan, was an educator who taught science in the Newport News public schools. His sister, Valerie Scott Price, was married to former Newport News mayor McKinley L. Price until her death in 2025; making their daughter, state delegate Marcia Price, Scott's niece.

Scott graduated from Groton School in 1965. He received his B.A. in government from Harvard College in 1969 and his Juris Doctor from Boston College Law School in 1973. He is a member of Alpha Phi Alpha fraternity. He was a lawyer in private practice in Newport News from 1973 to 1991.

Scott is an Episcopalian.

=== Military service ===
Scott is a former member of the Massachusetts Army National Guard (1970–73) and Army Reserve (1974–76).

== Virginia legislature ==
Scott was elected to the Virginia House of Delegates as a Democrat in 1977 and to the Senate of Virginia in 1982, after a census-based reapportionment changed district numbers (thus, his nominal predecessors were in fact representatives from Northern Virginia). In the Virginia legislature, Scott worked to allow the poor and children greater access to health care, as well as to increase the minimum wage, and increase job training. He also authored legislation providing tax credits to business that provide donations to serving local communities in preventing crime or improving social service delivery.

== U.S. House of Representatives ==
=== Elections ===
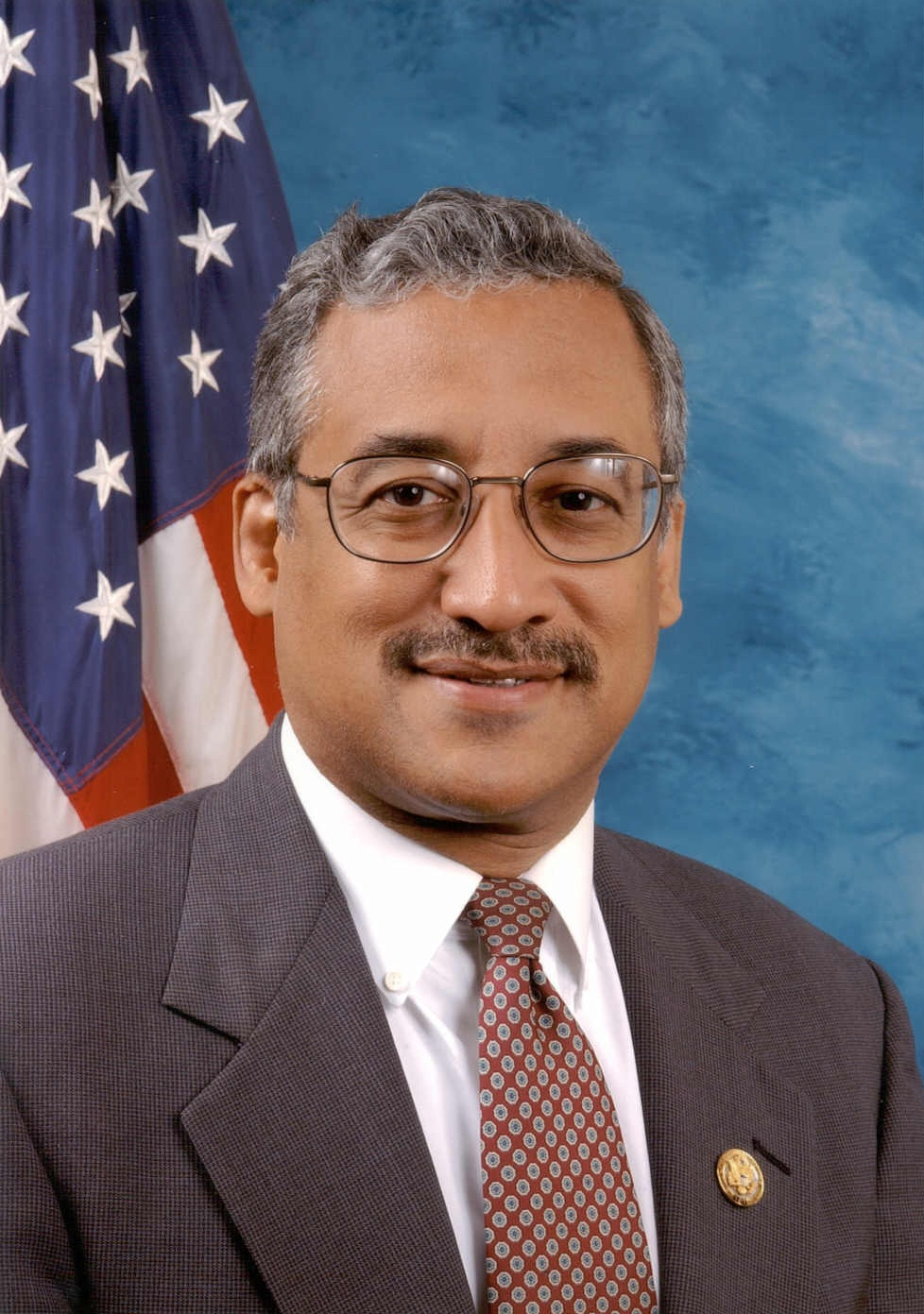
Scott during the 109th Congress

==== 1986 ====
Scott first ran for Congress in 1986 in the 1st district, which included his home in Newport News. He lost to Republican incumbent Herb Bateman, 56%-44%.

==== 1992 ====
In 1992, the Department of Justice directed the Virginia legislature to draw a black-majority district after the 1990 census. The legislature responded by shifting most of the black residents of Hampton Roads and Richmond into a newly created 3rd district. Scott won a three-way Democratic primary with 67% of the vote, which was tantamount to election in this heavily Democratic district. In the general election, he defeated Republican Dan Jenkins 79%-21%.

==== 1994-2008 ====
During this period, Scott was reelected every two years with at least 76% of the vote, except in 2004. That year, he was challenged by Republican Winsome Sears, a former State Delegate. He won with 69% of the vote, now the second-lowest winning percentage of his career. In 1994, Scott won 79.44% of the vote, defeating Republican Thomas E. Ward. In 1996, he won 82.12% of the vote, defeating Republican Eisle G. Holland. In 1998, he won 75.97% of the vote, defeating Independent Robert S. Barnett. He ran unopposed in 2000, 2002, 2006, and 2008.

==== 2010 ====
Scott defeated Republican Chuck Smith, a former JAG officer, 70%-27%.

==== 2012 ====
After redistricting, Scott's district was made even safer; he picked up all of Portsmouth and Newport News, as well as Petersburg. In 2008, President Barack Obama had carried the district with 76% of the vote; Scott won the new district with 78%, defeating Air Force officer Dean Longo. He easily won an 11th term with 81.26% of the vote.

Scott joined Obama in kicking off his campaign at Virginia Commonwealth University. The focus of the rally was largely on Obama's timeline for leaving the Middle East.

==== 2014 ====
Scott was unopposed for reelection, winning twelfth term in the U.S. House.

==== 2016 ====
The 3rd was reconfigured as a result of a court-ordered redistricting in 2015. It lost its territory in and around Richmond to the neighboring 4th district, but the new 3rd was no less Democratic than its predecessor.

Scott defeated Republican Marty Williams, 66%-33%, the lowest winning percentage of his career.

==== 2018 ====
Scott ran unopposed in both the Democratic primary and the general election, winning a fourteenth term in the U.S. House.

==== 2020 ====
Scott ran for a fifteenth term and defeated Republican John Collick in the general election.

==== 2022 ====
Scott ran for a sixteenth term and defeated Republican Terry Namkung in the general election.

==== 2024 ====
Scott ran for a seventeenth term and defeated Republican candidate John Sitka III in the general election.

==== 2026 ====
Scott ran for an 18th term in 2026 against three challengers. On November 3, 2026, he was reelected.

=== Tenure ===
Rep. Bobby Scott, D-VA, speaks in opposition to the Synthetic Drug Control Act of 2011 (HR 1254) by arguing that it is excessive in scope, imposes limits on researchers, and bypasses the existing process of banning substances. The legislation passed the next day, December 8, 2011, by 317–98. Video: C-SPAN

Scott is the first African American Representative from Virginia since Reconstruction. Also, having a maternal grandfather of Filipino ancestry makes Scott the first American of Filipino descent to serve as a voting member of Congress. His congressional district is the only one with a plurality black population in Virginia. It was created in 1992 and has remained the state's most Democratic district.

Scott's annual Labor Day picnic, usually held at his mother's residence in Newport News, is a major campaign stop for statewide and federal candidates in Virginia.

In 1997, Scott was one of two votes against the creation of a national registry for crimes against children and sexually violent offenders.

On November 7, 2009, Scott voted for the Affordable Health Care for America Act (HR 3962).

Scott has voted progressively in the House. He has supported increases in the minimum wage and has worked to eliminate anti-gay bias in the workplace. In 2010, Scott co-sponsored the "Lee-Scott bill" with Barbara Lee to make it easier on individuals who had been on unemployment for 99 weeks without finding work. Of the bill, Lee said, "it is important that we put in place a safety net for those still looking for work. We cannot and will not allow our fellow Americans to fall by the wayside. Congressman Scott and I plan to continue to push for passage of this legislation because it is simply the right thing to do."

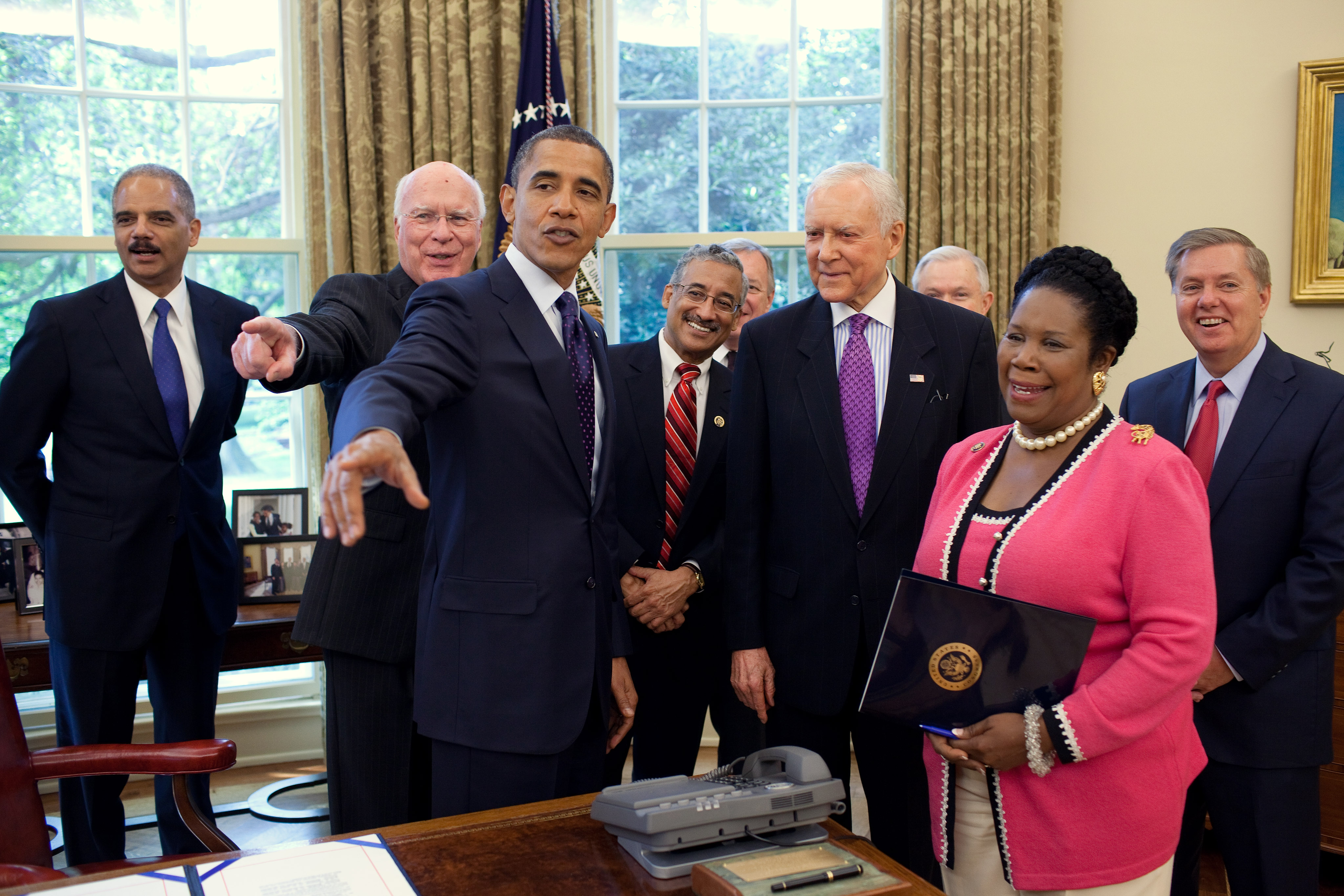
Scott (fourth from left) with President Obama and others at the signing of the Fair Sentencing Act in 2010

Scott supports LGBT rights. In 2009, he voted in favor of the Matthew Shepard and James Byrd Jr. Hate Crimes Prevention Act, a bill that expanded the federal hate crime law to cover crimes biased by the victim's sexual orientation or gender identity. In 2010, he voted in favor of the Don't Ask, Don't Tell Repeal Act. In 2019, Scott voted in favor of the Equality Act, a bill that would expand the federal Civil Rights Act of 1964 to ban discrimination based on sexual orientation and gender identity, and urged Congress members to support the legislation.

Scott was an outspoken opponent of the Bush administration. He opposed the Patriot Act, explaining that officials could abuse their power by promoting anti-terrorist security and develop unfair "racial profiling". In 2002 Scott voted against the Iraq war resolution and did not support any of the Bush Doctrine in reference to the Iraq war.

For his tenure as the chairman of the House Education and Labor Committee in the 116th Congress, Scott earned an "A" grade from the nonpartisan Lugar Center's Congressional Oversight Hearing Index.

Scott and Nikema Williams were the only two Democrats who voted against the expulsion of New York representative George Santos in 2023.

=== Legislation sponsored ===
Scott introduced the Death in Custody Reporting Act of 2013 (H.R. 1447; 113th Congress) on April 9, 2013. The bill would require the United States Department of Justice to collect data from U.S. states and territories about the deaths of prisoners in their custody. States and territories would face monetary penalties for noncompliance. It would also require federal agencies to report on the deaths of prisoners in their custody.

=== Committee assignments ===
- Committee on Education and Labor (ranking member)

=== Caucuses ===
- Black Maternal Health Caucus
- Congressional Asian Pacific American Caucus
- Congressional Black Caucus
- Congressional Arts Caucus
- Congressional Cement Caucus
- Congressional Equality Caucus
- Climate Solutions Caucus
- Congressional Ukraine Caucus
- Medicare for All Caucus

=== U.S. Senate speculation ===
When then-presumptive Democratic presidential nominee Hillary Clinton selected Tim Kaine, a U.S. Senator from Virginia, as her running mate in July 2016, speculation arose about who would be nominated to replace Kaine in the Senate should the ticket win. In August 2016, former Democratic Governor of Virginia Douglas Wilder stated that he would want Governor Terry McAuliffe to appoint Scott to the seat, stating that it "would be good for the commonwealth, good for the Democratic Party, of which Bobby has been most supportive, and great for our nation." On November 8, Clinton and Kaine lost the election and Kaine remained in his Senate seat.

=== Controversies ===
==== 2017 sexual harassment allegation ====
On December 15, 2017, Marsheri Everson (also known as M. Reese Everson), a former congressional fellow who had worked in Scott's office, alleged that Scott had sexually harassed her in 2013, touching her on the knee and back on separate occasions, then propositioning her with an inappropriate relationship after asking, "if you travel with me, are you going to be good?" Scott strongly denied Everson's claim. Everson was represented by two attorneys, one Jack Burkman, known for his involvement in the conspiracy theories surrounding the murder of Seth Rich as well as his alleged involvement in a scheme to pay women to lie about sexual harassment claims against special counsel and former FBI Director Robert Mueller. Everson's case against Scott was mutually dismissed in 2021.

== Electoral history ==
Virginia's 1st congressional district: 1986 results
Year	Democrat	Votes	Pct	Republican	Votes	Pct	
1986	Bobby Scott	63,364	44%	Herbert H. Bateman	80,713	56%	*

*Write-in and minor candidate notes: In 1986, write-ins received 9 votes.

Virginia's 3rd congressional district: Results 1992–2024
Year	Democrat	Votes	Pct	Republican	Votes	Pct		3rd Party	Party	Votes	Pct	
1992	Bobby Scott	132,432	79%	Daniel Jenkins	35,780	21%		Write-ins		261		
1994	Bobby Scott	108,532	79%	Thomas E. Ward	28,080	21%		Write-ins		8		
1996	Bobby Scott	118,603	82%	Elsie Goodwyn Holland	25,781	18%		Write-ins		34		
1998	Bobby Scott	48,129	76%	(no candidate)				Robert S. Barnett	Independent	14,453	23%	*
2000	Bobby Scott	137,527	98%	(no candidate)				Write-ins		3,226	2%	
2002	Bobby Scott	87,521	96%	(no candidate)				Write-ins		3,552	4%	
2004	Bobby Scott	159,373	69%	Winsome Sears	70,194	31%		Write-ins		325		
2006	Bobby Scott	133,546	96%	(no candidate)				Write-ins		5,448	4%	
2008	Bobby Scott	230,911	97%	(no candidate)				Write-ins		7,377	3%	
2010	Bobby Scott	114,656	70%	Chuck Smith	44,488	27%		James Quigley	Libertarian	2,383	2%	*
2012	Bobby Scott	259,199	81.27%	Dean J. Longo	58,931	18.48%	*	Write-ins		806	0.25%	
2014	Bobby Scott	139,197	94.43%	(no candidate)				Write-ins		8,205	5.57%	
2016	Bobby Scott	208,337	66.70%	Marty Williams	103,289	33.07%		Write-ins		714	0.23%	
2018	Bobby Scott	198,615	91.02%	(no candidate)				Write-ins		19,107	8.08%	
2020	Bobby Scott	233,326	68.35%	John Collick	107,299	31.43%		Write-ins		736	0.22%	
2022	Bobby Scott	139,659	67.02%	Terry Namkung	67,668	32.06%		Write-ins		516	0.25%	
2024	Bobby Scott	219,926	69.95%	John Sitka III	93,801	29.84%		Write-ins		670	0.21%	

*Write-in and minor candidate notes: In 1998, write-ins received 772 votes. In 2010, independent and write-in candidates received 2,210 votes.

== See also ==
- List of African-American United States representatives
- List of Asian Americans and Pacific Islands Americans in the United States Congress

U.S. House of Representatives
Preceded by Thomas Bliley	Member of the U.S. House of Representatives from Virginia's 3rd congressional district 1993–present	Incumbent
Preceded by George Miller	Ranking Member of the House Education Committee; 2015–2019	Succeeded by Virginia Foxx
Preceded by Virginia Foxx	Chair of the House Education Committee; 2019–2023	Succeeded by Virginia Foxx
Preceded by Virginia Foxx	Ranking Member of the House Education Committee; 2023–present	Incumbent
U.S. order of precedence (ceremonial)
Preceded by Jim Clyburn	United States representatives by seniority 14th	Succeeded by Nydia Velázquez
Preceded by Jim Clyburn	Order of precedence of the United States	Succeeded by Nydia Velázquez
