= USS Semmes =

Two ships of the United States Navy have been named "Semmes", in honor of Commander (USN), Rear Admiral (CSN), Brigadier General (CSA) Raphael Semmes

- USS Semmes (DD-189), a Clemson-class destroyer, commissioned in 1920, served in World War II and decommissioned in 1946. She was reclassified as AG-24 in 1935.
- USS Semmes (DDG-18), Charles F. Adams-class guided missile destroyer, commissioned in 1962 and decommissioned in 1991.
