= Bernard B. Semmes =

American politician

Mayor of Newport News, Virginia
- Preceded by: Maryus Jones
- Succeeded by: Allan A. Moss

Bernard Brockenbrough Semmes (1864-1917) was a Virginia lawyer and the mayor of Newport News, Virginia from September 1, 1912 to September 1, 1916.

== Biography ==
Semmes was born in Lexington, Virginia on September 22, 1864. He graduated from the Virginia Military Institute and obtained a law degree from Washington and Lee University School of Law. He served one term as mayor of Newport News, Virginia, before dying in Newport News in 1917.

| Preceded by Maryus Jones | Mayor of Newport News; 1912–1916 | Succeeded by Allan A. Moss |
