= Hotel Warwick =

Historic hotel in Virginia, US

- U.S. National Register of Historic Places
- Virginia Landmarks Register
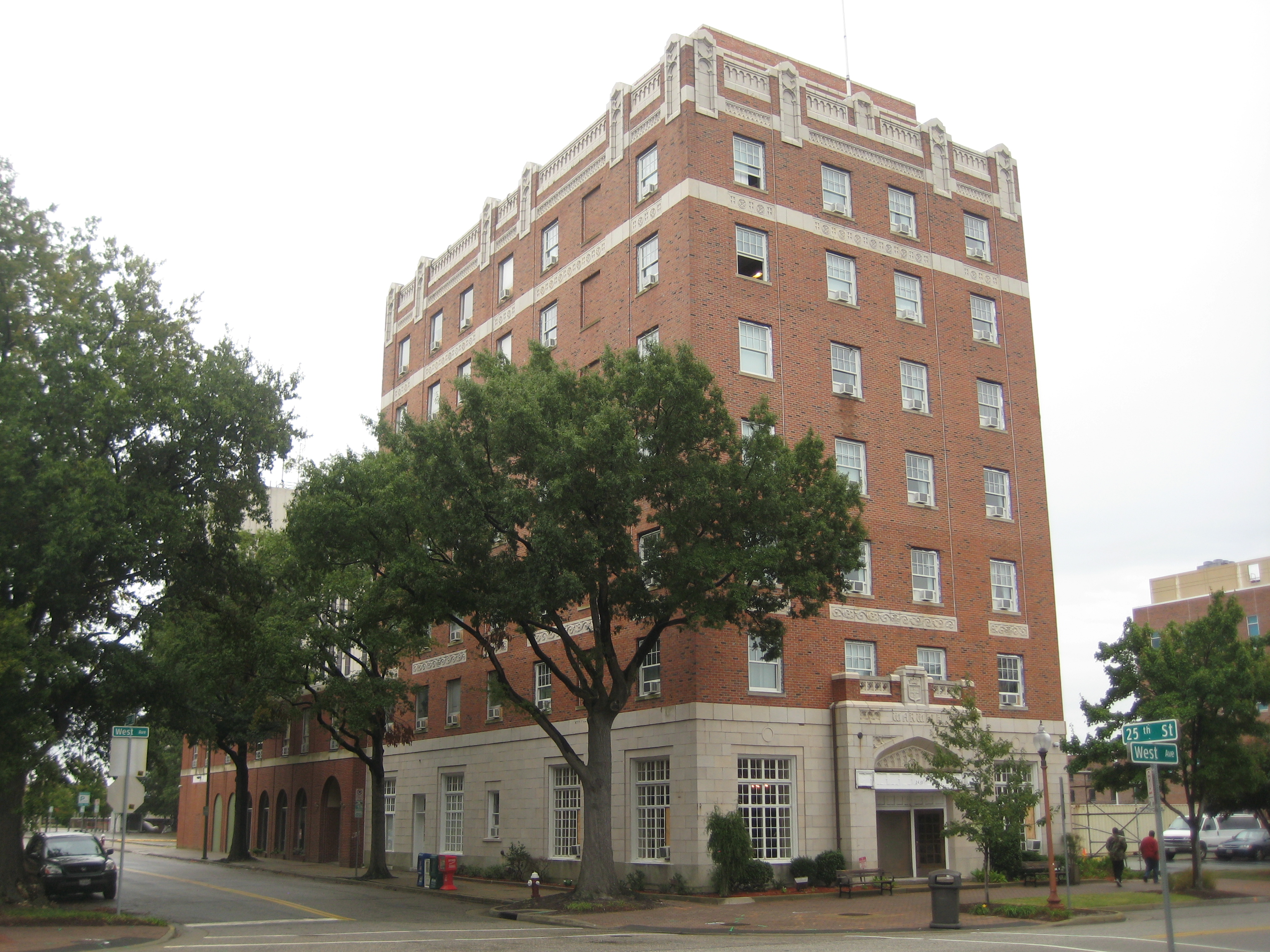
- Hotel Warwick, September 2012

- Location within Virginia Location within the United States
- Location: 25th St. and West Ave., Newport News, Virginia
- Coordinates: 36°58′36″N 76°25′55″W
- Area: 0.3 acres (0.12 ha)
- Built: 1928, 1962
- Architectural style: Art Deco, Gothic Revival
- NRHP reference No.: 84000044
- VLR No.: 121-0040

Significant dates
- Added to NRHP: October 4, 1984
- Designated VLR: August 21, 1984

Hotel Warwick is a historic hotel building located at Newport News, Virginia. It was built in 1928, and is a seven-story, brick building in an eclectic Gothic Revival / Art Deco style. It features terra cotta tile ornamentation and a continuous terra cotta and brick false parapet. A two-story addition was added to the rear of the building in 1962. It was the first skyscraper, first tower hotel and first fireproof hotel in Newport News. It replaced an earlier Hotel Warwick built by Collis Potter Huntington in 1883.

It was listed on the National Register of Historic Places in 1984.
