= First Baptist Church (Newport News, Virginia) =

Historic church in Virginia, United States

- First Baptist Church-Newport News
- U.S. National Register of Historic Places
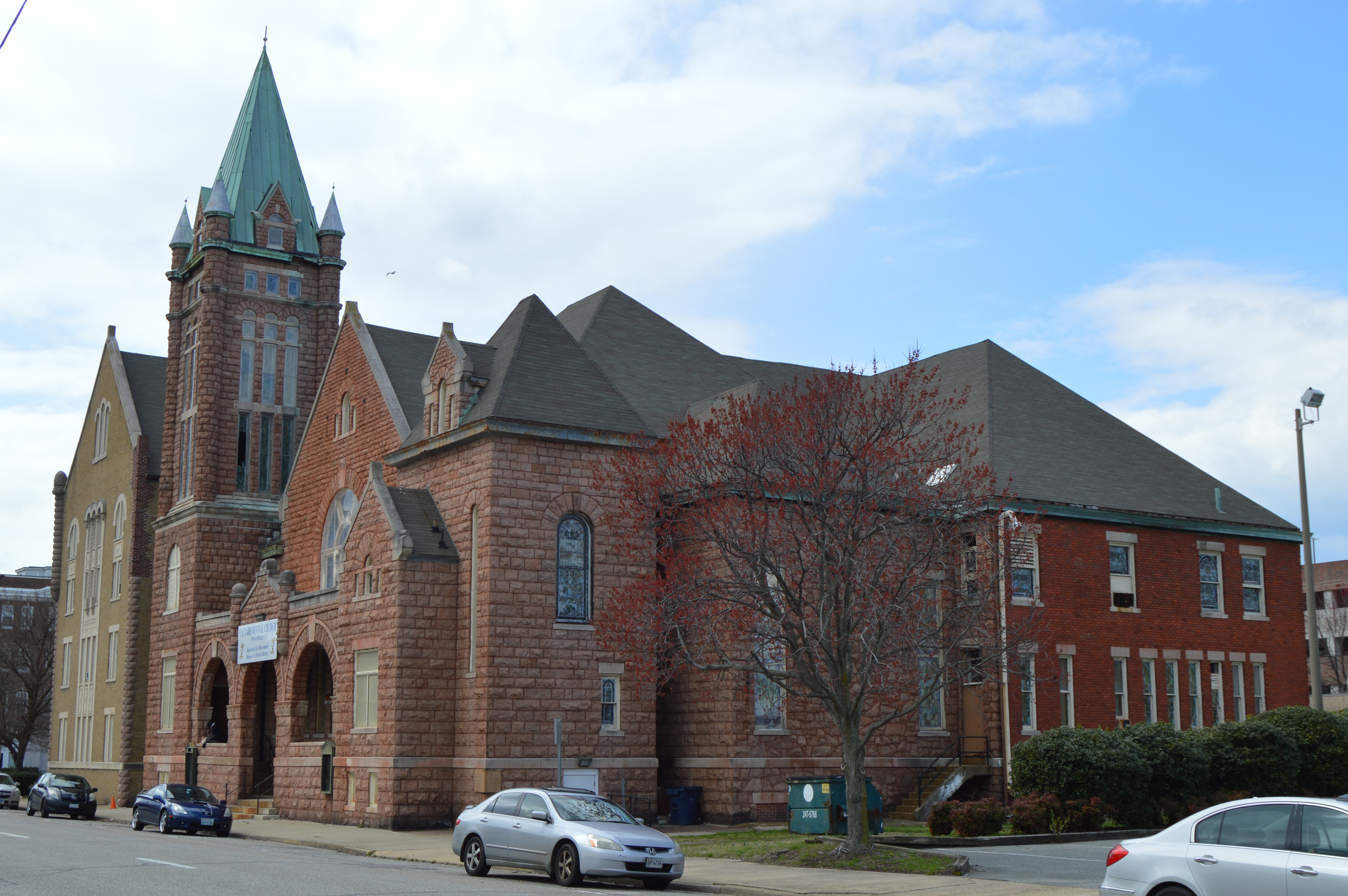
- Front and eastern side

- Location within Virginia Location within the United States
- Location: 119 29th St., Newport News, Virginia
- Coordinates: 36°58′48″N 76°25′59″W
- Area: Less than 1 acre (0.40 ha)
- Built: 1903
- Architect: R. H. Hunt
- Architectural style: Richardsonian Romanesque
- NRHP reference No.: 00000774
- Added to NRHP: May 11, 2000

The First Baptist Church is a historic church building, now housing the non-denominational Dominion Outreach Worship Center, at 119 29th Street in Newport News, Virginia. Built in 1902, the church is a prominent local example of Romanesque Revival architecture executed in stone. It was designed by R.H. Hunt of Chattanooga. It is fronted by a three-arch recessed porch, flanked by a tower on the left whose upper stages have rounded corners, and is capped by a pyramidal roof with conical turrets at the corners.

== History ==
The congregation responsible for building the church was organized as Newport News Baptist Church in 1881, the same year the C&O Railway came to the area. A meeting on 14 July 1881 held at Warwick (Denbigh) Baptist Church ordained L.R. Millbourne as the initial pastor, who served simultaneously at Denbigh (Warwick County), Newport News, and Emmaus (York County) for a time. With the railroad's arrival came rapid development of the area, and by June 14, 1883 the congregation is constituted as First Baptist Church (Newport News). This was the same year the first telephone switchboard was established in Newport News. In 1888, land was granted by Rev. Isaac Gates. A brick building was erected and dedicated at the corner of 29th Street and Washington Avenue on November 23, 1890.

Huntington's newly established Newport News Shipbuilding brought industrialization and the need for new workers to the local area. The congregation likewise grew and a larger building became necessary. A new church building was built in the middle of the 29th street block in 1902. The first service in the new building was held December 20, 1903. A fire on January 27, 1906, destroyed the 1902 building, but it was quickly rebuilt in place and services resumed by May 12, 1907. In 1930, the three-story education building was added. The congregation opened a satellite suburban chapel 8.4 miles north in 1979. It operated on both sites for many years before closing the 29th Street church in the 1980s.

The downtown building, and the attached education building, were listed on the National Register of Historic Places in 2000. Since First Baptist left the building, it has been owned and occupied by a number of churches. In 2000 it was owned by Rehoboth Fellowship Church, later it was occupied by Calvary Revival Church Peninsula, and in 2022 by Dominion Outreach Worship Center.

== See also ==
- National Register of Historic Places listings in Newport News, Virginia
