= Walter A. Post =

American politician

Mayor of Newport, Virginia
- In office November 1896 – September 1, 1898
- Preceded by: None, new office
- Succeeded by: Allan A. Moss

Personal details
- Born: January 7, 1857; Kingston, New York, U.S.
- Died: February 12, 1912

Walter A. Post (January 7, 1857 - February 12, 1912) was the first mayor of Newport News, Virginia.

He was born in Kingston, New York, on 7 January 1857, and studied as a civil engineer.

He was sent to Newport News by his brother-in-law, Eugene White of Brooklyn, who had contracted with railroad magnate Collis P. Huntington to build a cargo terminal at the end of the newly built eastern terminus of the Chesapeake & Ohio Railway on the Virginia Peninsula, in 1880.

When Newport News was chartered as an independent city in 1896, Post was chosen to serve as acting mayor until the city's first municipal elections could be held. On July 1 of that year, he was elected. Post chose to serve only one term as mayor, stepping down in 1898.

In 1902 Post commissioned a handsome Beaux Arts style mansion on Huntington Avenue in the North End Neighborhood of Newport News. The Post house still stands, surrounded by its original wrought-iron fence at 5600 Huntington Avenue, the largest lot in the North End.

In 1911, he assumed the presidency of Newport News Shipbuilding & Dry Dock Company. He would hold that office until his death in 1912. The newspapers of the day attributed his death to "overwork", and heart failure. His entire time in Newport News was spent serving as a kind of lieutenant for Huntington, who essentially built the city of Newport News to serve his railroad.

Post Street in the Hilton Village historic district in Newport News is named after Post.

Preceded by none	Mayor of Newport News; 1896–1898	Succeeded by Allan A. Moss
