= Collis P. Huntington High School =

Former African-American high school during the racial segregation era

Location
- 36°59′22″N 76°24′54.5″W

Information
- Type: Public, segregated
- Founded: 1927
- Closed: 1981
- Last updated: 29 December 2017

Collis P. Huntington High School, commonly referred to as just Huntington High School (opened in 1927) was a black high school located in the East End section of Newport News, Virginia, US, during the era of racial segregation. After desegregation, it became an integrated intermediate school (eighth and ninth grades), and in 1981 was converted to a middle school (sixth through eighth grades). The school was named after the shipping and railroad pioneer, Collis P. Huntington, who founded the local shipyards, the Newport News Shipbuilding & Dry Dock Company, at one time the largest shipbuilding concern in the world.

Lutrelle Palmer, the principal of Huntington High, also a strong NAACP advocate, whose own wages were supplemented by voluntary parental contributions, in November 1937 chastised his daughter for accepting a job in Newport News that paid her a third less per month than a beginning white teacher earned. This led to a unanimous vote by the Virginia State Teachers Association to file equal-pay lawsuits in partnership with the NAACP. This move paved the way to a statewide campaign attacking the legal basis for school segregation. Palmer was sacked from the school in 1943 for his activism.

Huntington's football team, coached by Thad Madden from 1943 through 1971, had 28 straight winning seasons, compiling a 251-114-16 record. Madden's Huntington teams won sixteen Virginia Interscholastic Association eastern District titles and seven VIA state championships. Huntington track and field squads, also under Madden, won 19 VIA state championships and were declared seven times runners-up after the VIA integrated with the Virginia High School League.

== Notable alumni ==
- Joe Durham, Former MLB player (Baltimore Orioles. St. Louis Cardinals)
- Former U.S. Energy Secretary, Hazel R. O'Leary (1937-)
- Thaddeus E. Hayes, founder of Thaddeus Hayes Dance Theatre (ca. 1928-April 26, 2000)
