= Port Warwick =

Coordinates: 37.071046°N 76.484557°W

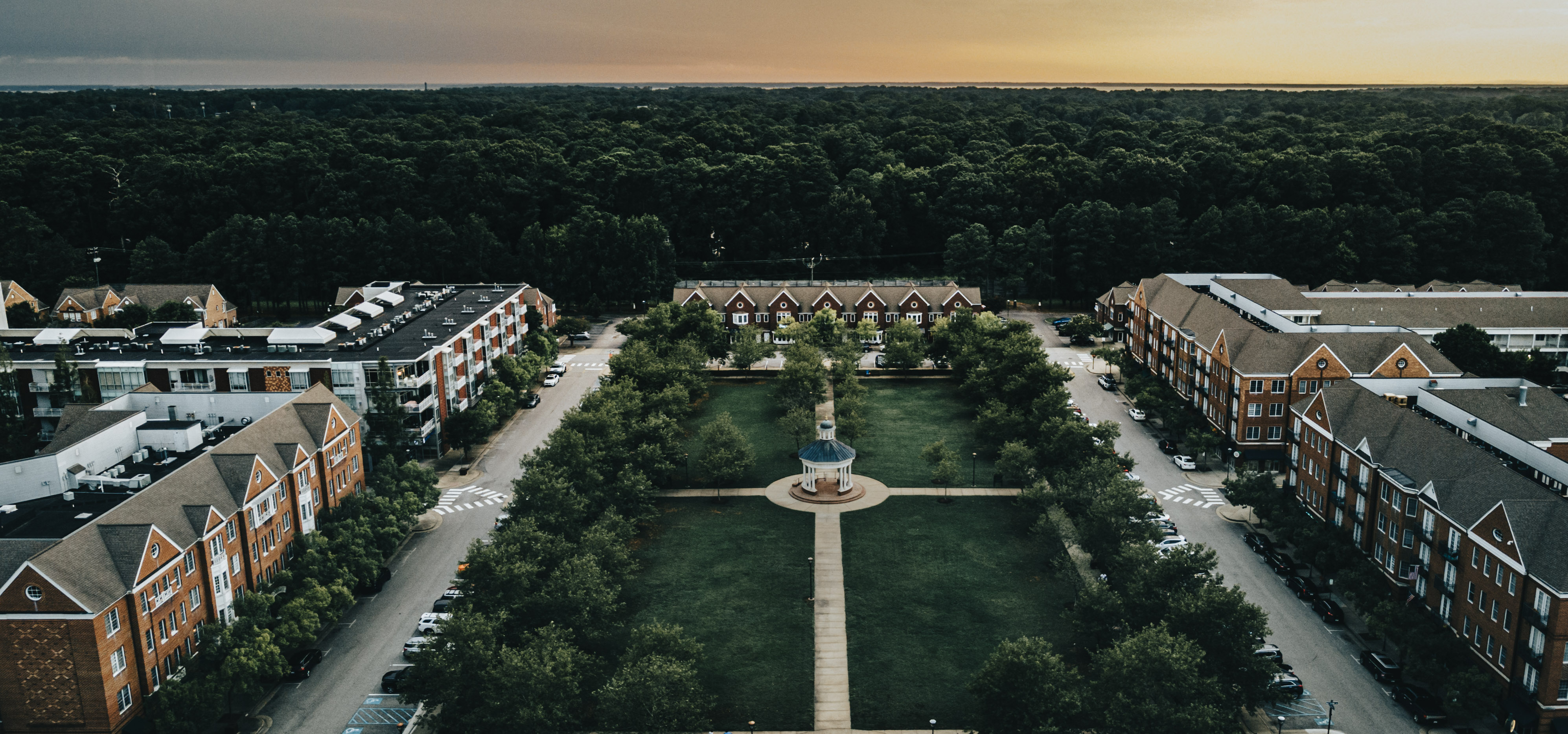
Styron Square, Port Warwick

Port Warwick is a neighborhood located in the Oyster Point area in Newport News, Virginia. It is a mixed-use new urbanism development built upon a 150-acre (0.61 km^{2}) parcel. Port Warwick is a pedestrian-oriented community and the second-largest planned community in Newport News other than Kiln Creek. Residents can walk from home to their workplace, shops, and restaurants, or they can make a short drive of several miles to the city’s main shopping and office areas. Not far from Port Warwick is the new Oyster Point City Center, another bustling central business district in Oyster Point. It is very similar to Port Warwick, with office space and a pedestrian-friendly environment.

The entrance of Port Warwick is located at the intersection of Jefferson Avenue and Loftis Boulevard, the main thoroughfare in the development. On one corner is a village of business that are located at the front. The buildings have an architecture that fits in with the theme of an old town feel that is at the core of Port Warwick. The other corner is the Sentara Port Warwick Medical Arts campus, which houses several specialty medical practices and an emergency care center.

It is named after the fictional city in William Styron's novel, Lie Down in Darkness. The streets are named after historical authors. Port Warwick has been designed to be a unique high quality neighborhood, having the feel of an older, established traditional inner city area, such as the Fan District in Richmond or Old Town Alexandria. Many of the streets and squares are named after American literary figures from the 19th and 20th centuries. The names that were chosen were "a reflection of personal learning", said Styron, since the number of places were limited. He believes that the names chosen "represent the best in the great flowering of American literary art".

Styron square is in the center of Port Warwick, which will be designed similar to squares found in London, England. Around Styron Square are blocks of mixed-use buildings, all of which will overlook the square. These buildings will have retail and commercial space on the ground floor and on the upper floors will have residential space. The retail space is called "The Shoppes at Port Warwick", and is the first luxury retail shopping and dining district on the Virginia Peninsula. A pavilion located in the center of the square is the stage for community events.

The residential area will have a mix of single-family detached residences, Duplex Village and Carriage homes and town homes located around 4 residential squares and a public sculpture. All will be constructed out of brick, with floor-to-ceiling windows throughout the house. Most residences will overlook the residential squares, and the streets will be located on city blocks, like an old town city. There are also two luxury apartment buildings with one, two and three bedroom apartments that are elegantly decorated. They are a first on the Virginia Peninsula.

A first in all of Eastern Virginia, The Melville, located on Styron Square, houses some of the most luxurious condominiums in all of the state. The condominiums are located inside a four-story building in Styron Square, with some of the most distinctive and architecturally significant buildings on the Peninsula. The condominiums will have two to three bedrooms, custom kitchens, spacious closets, oversized windows, and large balconies.

Public art is prominently showcased in Port Warwick, with five statues within the development. The art and architecture help generate its old town-feel.

Located right in the heart of Oyster Point, there is access to three interchanges of Interstate 64 within two miles (3 km) of Port Warwick, as well as access to bus service and the Newport News/Williamsburg International Airport.

The project has won several awards, such as "Best New Community - 2002" from the Peninsula Homebuilders Association, and "Virginia Citizen Planner of the Year" for Bobby Freeman, the designer, from the Virginia Citizen’s Planner Association of Charlottesville, Virginia.
