= Power Equipment Direct =

Retail company

- Company type: Subsidiary
- Industry: E-Commerce
- Founded: 2002 in Bolingbrook, IL, USA
- Founder: Jon Hoch
- Headquarters: 969 Veterans Parkway, Bolingbrook, Illinois, USA
- Products: Outdoor Power Equipment
- Number of employees: 60
- Parent: Ferguson Enterprises
- Website: powerequipmentdirect.com

Power Equipment Direct (PED) is an online retail company based in Bolingbrook, Illinois, USA. The company began in 2002 selling pressure washers, and now operates many niche websites selling different types of outdoor power equipment, including air compressors, chainsaws, electric generators, log splitters, lawn mowers, snow blowers, sump pumps, water pumps and accessories.

== History ==
=== 2002 to 2003 ===
Jon Hoch founded Power Equipment Direct in 2002 following a negative experience he had while shopping for a lawn mower. Hoch originally ran the business out of his basement.

=== 2004 to 2007 ===
In 2004, Power Equipment Direct launched its third Web store, AirCompressorsDirect.com

In 2007, Power Equipment Direct was named on the Internet Retailer “Hot 100 List” and the Inc. 5000 list. Along with this, it also added SnowBlowersDirect.com to its repertoire of web stores.

=== 2008 to 2010 ===
In 2008, Power Equipment Direct added three more Web stores: MowersDirect.com, SumpPumpDirect.com and WaterPumpsDirect.com. PED was listed in Inc. 5000 for the second consecutive year and made the Internet Retailer “Top 500” list for the first time.

2009 saw the launch of two more Web stores: ChainSawsDirect.com and LogSplittersDirect.com. Power Equipment Direct was named to the Internet Retailer “Top 500” list for the second consecutive time and Inc. 5000 for the third consecutive year.

To accommodate quick growth, Power Equipment Direct expanded into a new warehouse in 2010. The company again made the Internet Retailer “Top 500” and the Inc. 5000 list.

=== 2011 ===
Until 2011, Power Equipment Direct operated exclusively as a pure-play Internet retailer. That year PED opened a physical showroom, located in Bolingbrook, IL. The company was named to the Internet Retailer “Top 500” list and the Inc. 5000 list for the fourth and fifth consecutive years, respectively.

Power Equipment Direct entered into a partnership with Operation Support Our Troops America in the Fall of 2011. The company donated $1 for every Facebook “Like” it received in September.

In October 2011, Power Equipment Direct consolidated all its Web stores on one site, replacing the corporate Web site at PowerEquipmentDirect.com.

=== 2012 to present ===
On January 30, 2012, Power Equipment Direct launched its tenth niche web store, Tillers Direct, which exclusively sells garden tillers and cultivators.

On May 14, 2012, Power Equipment Direct launched its eleventh niche web store, Leaf Blowers Direct, which exclusively sells a variety of leaf blowers.

Also in 2012, Power Equipment Direct was named to the Internet Retailer Top 500 list for the fifth consecutive year. PED ranked as the 197th largest online retailer.

In 2012, Power Equipment Direct was acquired by Ferguson Enterprises

On February 1, 2013, Power Equipment Direct launched its twelfth niche web store, Chippers Direct. This site sells a variety of woodchippers and accessories.

On March 8, 2013, Power Equipment Direct launched its thirteenth niche web store, String Trimmers Direct. This site sells a variety of string trimmers and accessories.

In May 2015 Power Equipment Direct acquired eComfort.com, a direct to consumer online store in the heating and cooling (HVAC) industry.
