= Newport News Victory Arch =

Monument in Virginia, United States

Coordinates: 36°58′36.9″N 76°25′56.6″W

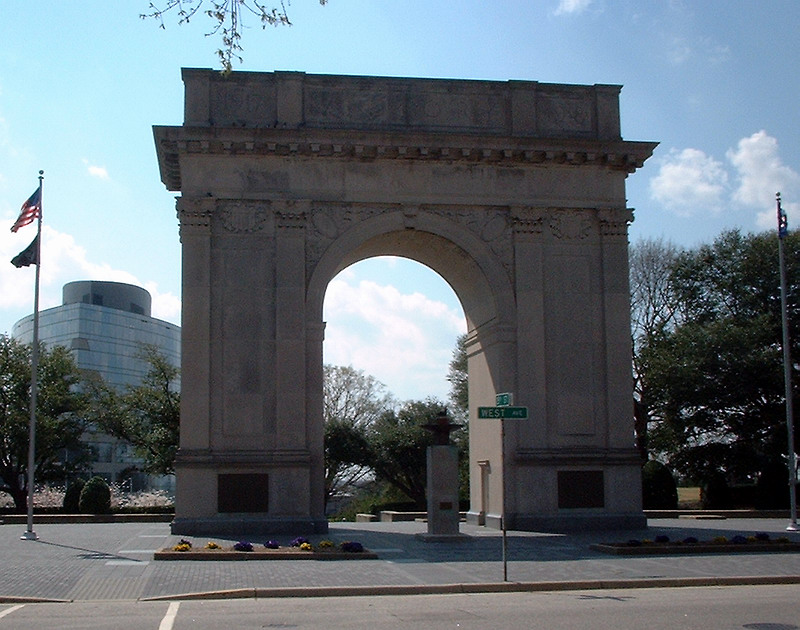
Newport News Victory Arch

The Newport News Victory Arch (or simply Victory Arch) is a monument in Newport News, Virginia, erected first in 1919 and then rebuilt in 1962. The Victory Arch was established as a memorial to those who served in the American armed forces during periods of war. It is located on 25th Street and West Avenue in downtown Newport News, near the Jessie M. Rattley Municipal Center.

== Building the arch ==
Newport News served as a Port of Embarkation for the American armed forces during World War I. Following the Armistice, almost half a million American troops were set to return to America via the ports of the city. Public desire to build an arch was high, mimicking the erection of similar arches elsewhere in the country. While many wished the structure to be permanent, the rate at which soldiers were already returning made this unfeasible. It was then decided to build a temporary arch, and to revisit the idea of a permanent arch at a later date.

Funding was achieved through public subscription drives, and work on the arch began quickly. Ralph Preas was a Newport News shipyard draftsman that was chosen for the job. Preas designed the structure to be 50 feet wide, with two bases measuring 16 square feet each and 18-foot span. The original building was hollow - the framework was made of brick and wood, with stucco making up the exterior. The arch was completed (mostly with volunteer labor) in April 1919. As troops returned to American soil, they were marched under the arch. Initial crowds were small, but with the help of the city's Welcome Home Committee, soon every ship full of soldiers was met by a large crowd of local citizens.

== Maintenance of temporary edifice ==
The structure as built in 1919 was not expected to stand for more than two years — the time it would take for Newport News to see its last returning soldier. The arch ended up standing for over forty years. During that period, the City Council for Newport News ended up appropriating more money for maintenance of the arch — approximately seven thousand dollars — than it took to build it originally. Although Newport News served as a Port of Embarkation again during World War II, returning troops did not march under the arch, in part because of its fragile condition.

The arch also suffered from the development of the city around it. The area became subject to commercial development, so much so that at one point each side of the arch sat on the property of a different gas station. Passersby were subject to falling stucco and dangers from the traffic pattern surrounding the arch that made it into a 50-foot tall blind spot. Parts of the structure began to collapse after rotting through.

== A new, permanent structure ==
Calls to replace the "temporary" monument with a more permanent structure came almost immediately. Attempts at securing federal funding to construct a new arch proved unsuccessful. As a committee of veterans and volunteers began to make fund-raising plans, there was some concern from others in the community that they were attempting to replace a "dead monument," and that a park, civic center, school, or hospital would prove to be more functional and useful to the city's citizens. Despite these protests, the necessary funds were collected to complete the new arch, made of stone, and it was rededicated on May 30, 1962.

On Memorial Day, 1969, an eternal flame was donated by the American Legion to the arch site. Standing fourteen feet high the eternal flame which sits under the arch was cast in bronze by Womack Foundry, Inc. (of Newport News) in the 1960s, and was hand crafted by the Foundry's founder and president, Ernest D. Womack.

== Eternal flame controversy ==
In 1973, the flame that had been established was ordered to be turned off by then-City Manager William Lawson. The call to extinguish the flame came during the oil shortage of that year. As one would expect, this met with severe criticism and protest, especially from veterans' groups. The solution provided by the city was to replace the flame with a flashing light, which has been described as looking "absurd". The flame remained unlit until Memorial Day, 1978. The flame was threatened again the next year, when the new City Manager, Frank Smiley, was looking for ways to cut expenses. The flame's cost (five hundred dollars per month) was seen as a potential savings. Eventually, a compromise was reached, and a new fuel line that burned less gas was installed. The bill was reduced to sixty-five dollars a month. This led Charlie Covington, the city treasurer, to remark, "Since there are 670 names on Victory Arch plaques, that works out to about one third of a penny per day per person. I'd hate like hell to come back and look down and see Smiley has cut off the flame for a third of a penny per day per person."
