= Daily Press (Virginia) =

Newspaper in Newport News, Virginia

- The November 6, 2025, front page of the Daily Press
- Type: Daily newspaper
- Format: Broadsheet, online
- Owner: Tribune Publishing
- Publisher: Par Ridder (Interim General Manager)
- Editor: Kris Worrell
- Founded: 1896
- Circulation: According to the October 2, 2022 postal certificate printed in the paper, circulation is now just over 17,000. This number includes complimentary copies given to people who subscribe to the sister paper, The Virginia Gazette. This is a significant drop from 2016 numbers of 55,000 daily 85,000 Sunday At that time, the paper still employed local consumer marketing staff.
- ISSN: 2767-5971
- Website: dailypress.com

The Daily Press is a daily morning newspaper published in Newport News, Virginia, which covers the lower and middle Peninsula of Tidewater Virginia. It was established in 1896 and bought by Tribune Company in 1986. Current owner Tribune Publishing spun off from the company in 2014. In 2016, the Daily Press has a daily average readership of approximately 101,100. It had a Sunday average readership of approximately 169,200. Using a frequently used industry-standard readership of 2.2 readers per copy, the October 2022 readership is estimated to be 38,000. It is the sister newspaper to Norfolk's The Virginian-Pilot, which was its southern market rival until Tribune's purchase of that paper in 2018; the papers have both been based at the Daily Press building since May 2020.

The Daily Press is distributed to the following cities and counties: Gloucester, Hampton, Isle of Wight, James City, Newport News, Poquoson, Smithfield, Williamsburg, and York. Through its website at dailypress.com, the Daily Press also covers stories on the "Southside", which includes Chesapeake, Norfolk, Portsmouth, Suffolk, and Virginia Beach. Monthly, dailypress.com currently receives nearly 7 million page views.

The Daily Press also owns and publishes The Virginia Gazette, a morning newspaper in Williamsburg, Virginia, which publishes on Wednesdays and Saturdays. It covers Williamsburg, James City County, and York County, and has an average readership of 29,324. Annually, vagazette.com currently receives over 5 million page views.

Additionally, the Daily Press also owns and publishes The Tidewater Review, a morning newspaper in West Point, Virginia, which publishes on Wednesdays. It covers King and Queen County, New Kent County, and King William County; and has a Wednesday readership of 3,100.

== History ==
The Daily Press published its first edition on January 4, 1896, just 12 days before the General Assembly declared Newport News a city on January 16, 1896. Charles E. Thacker owned and edited the paper from a small printing shop in the basement of the First National Bank at 28th Street and Washington Avenue. Thacker promised in his four-page first edition to "espouse the right and oppose the wrong wherever found." Thacker sold copies of his paper for one cent.

In 1910, Thacker sold his business to bankers Henry and George Schmelz, who formed The Daily Press Inc. In 1913, they bought The Times-Herald, giving them control of both the morning and afternoon newspapers in the area. Between 1913 and 1986, the papers were owned and managed by members of the Van Buren and Bottom families. The papers were relocated to several sites within the business and financial district of downtown Newport News until 1968, when a building was constructed on Warwick Boulevard. A Production Center was added to the building in 1983 and expanded in 2004. The newspapers are now printed at a facility in Hanover, Virginia. The Times-Herald published its final edition on August 30, 1991, leaving the Daily Press as the only major newspaper of the lower and middle Peninsula. In December 2014, the Daily Press relocated to its current location on Mariners Row in City Center at Oyster Point in Newport News.

In 1986, Tribune Company (now Tribune Publishing) bought the Daily Press and its affiliated operations, which included cable television stations in Newport News and Danville, Virginia. Tribune named Joseph D. Cantrell CEO and Publisher. Cantrell (1986-1994) was followed by Jack W. Davis Jr. (1994–1998), Kathleen Waltz (1998–2000), Rondra Mathews (2000–2006), Digby Solomon (2006–2016), and Marisa Porto (2016–2019). Par Ridder is currently the interim general manager. Marisa Porto was the first to take on the official title of Publisher and Editor-in-Chief after a structural change to Tribune Publishing in early 2016.

Porto became editor of the Daily Press and The Virginian-Pilot following Tribune Publishing's acquisition of the Norfolk-based Pilot in May 2018. She departed in March 2019. Kris Worrell was hired as editor of both publications in the summer of 2019. All of the publications fall under Tribune Publishing's Virginia Media.

Neither newsroom currently has a physical location. The Daily Press newsroom in Newport News' City Center was vacated in September 2020.

== Corporate affairs ==
The headquarters are in the City Center at Oyster Point complex.

== Products ==
The Daily Press – via Daily Press Media Group – offers a numerous variety of traditional and non-traditional print and digital products to businesses and companies looking to expand their reach in the Hampton Roads area. Variously sized print and deliver inserts and sticky ad notes can be targeted down and delivered to specific zip codes. Annual special section publications and events target niche audiences; examples include the MyTime Women's Show, Prime Time (55+), and Choice Awards ("Best Of"). The TidewaterBiz newsletter targets a professional audience with economic forecasts and business headlines. Products like ad mail, email reach extension, and Weather.com allow advertisers to target particular audiences beyond dailypress.com.

== Virginia Press Association Awards ==
The Daily Press, Virginia Gazette, and Tidewater Review are multi-year recipients of Virginia Press Association (VPA) Awards.

== Notable employees and alumni ==
Tony Snow served as editorial page editor from 1982 to 1984 and went on to become a nationally syndicated columnist and White House press secretary under President George W. Bush from April 2006 until September 2007.
