= North End Historic District (Newport News, Virginia) =

Historic district in Virginia, United States

- U.S. National Register of Historic Places
- U.S. Historic district
- Virginia Landmarks Register
- Location within Virginia Location within the United States
- Location: Roughly bounded by Sixty-eighth St., Warwick Blvd., Fiftieth St., and Huntington Ave., Newport News, Virginia
- Coordinates: 37°00′02″N 76°26′30″W
- Area: 92 acres (37 ha)
- Built: 1920
- Architectural style: Colonial Revival, Bungalow/craftsman, Late Victorian
- NRHP reference No.: 86001999
- VLR No.: 121-0043

Significant dates
- Added to NRHP: August 28, 1986
- Designated VLR: June 17, 1986

North End Historic District is a national historic district located at Newport News, Virginia. It encompasses 451 contributing buildings in a primarily residential section of Newport News. It is a compact, middle-class and upper middle-class residential neighborhood that arose during the period 1900–1935 in association with the nearby Newport News Shipbuilding and Dry Dock Company. The neighborhood includes notable examples of the Victorian, Colonial Revival, and Bungalow styles. Notable buildings include the Walter A. Post House (1902), John Livesay House (1906), J. E. Warren House (1905), W. L. Shumate House (1915), and Willet House (c. 1930).

It was listed on the National Register of Historic Places in 1986.
