= Newport News, Virginia =

- Independent city
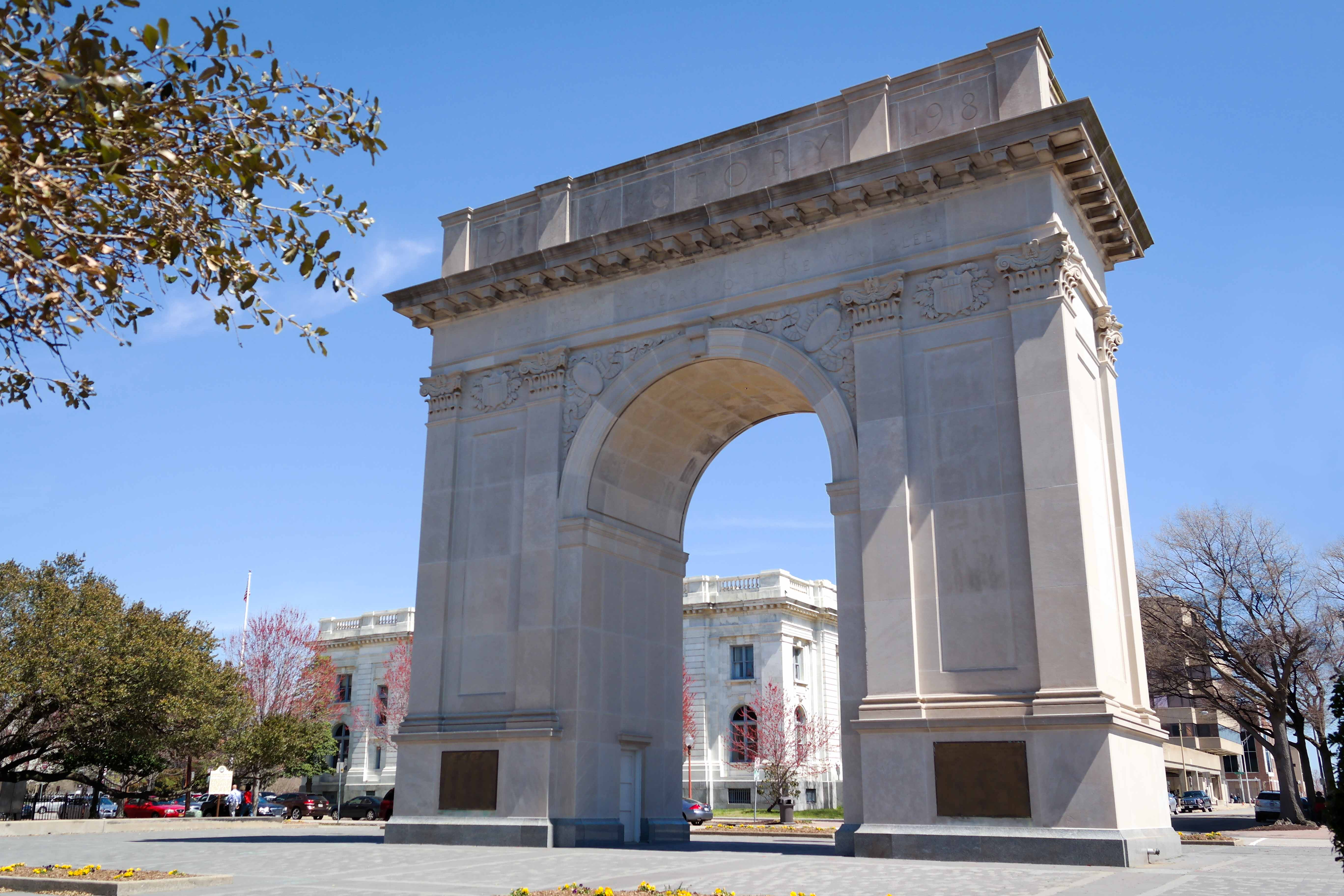
- Newport News Victory Arch

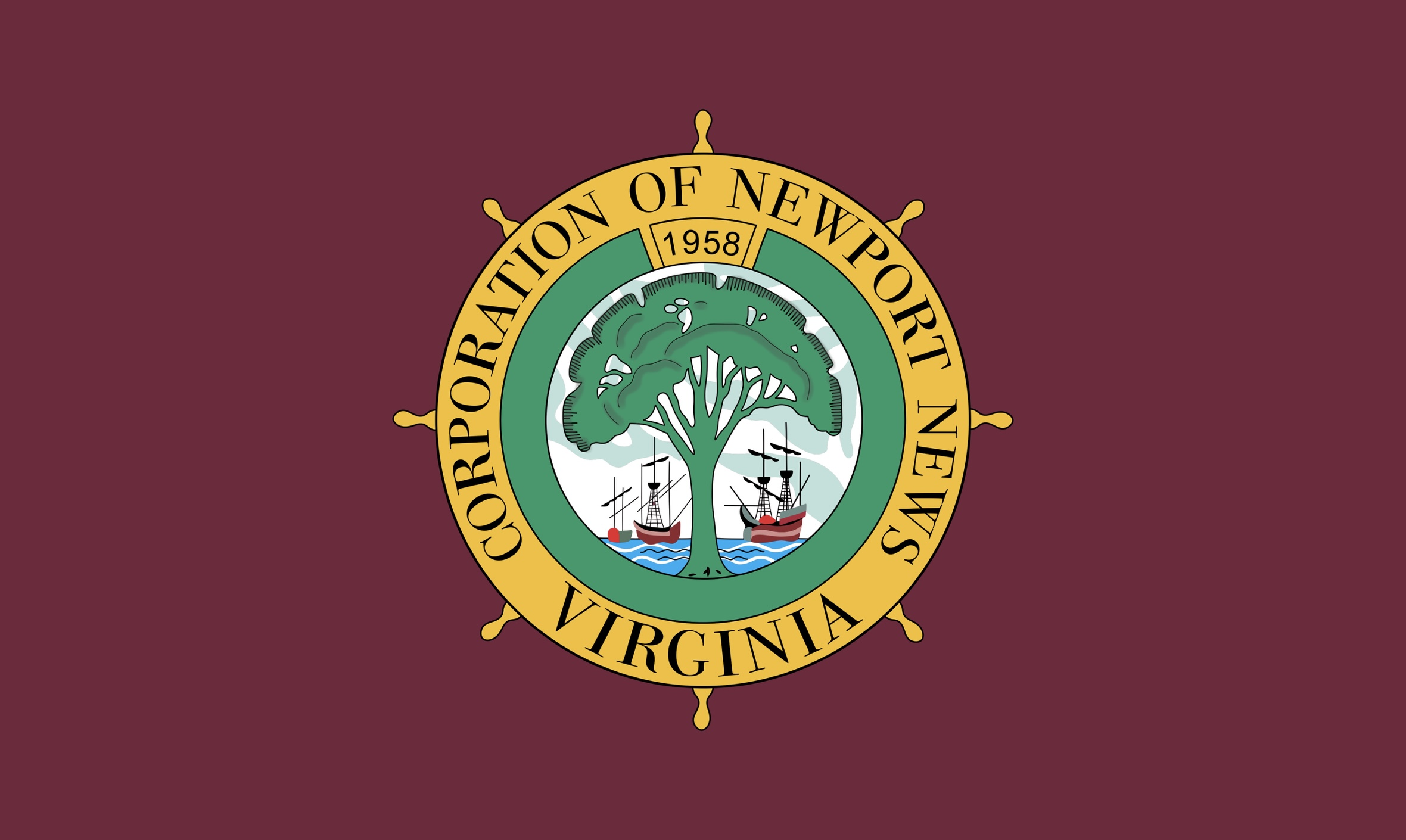
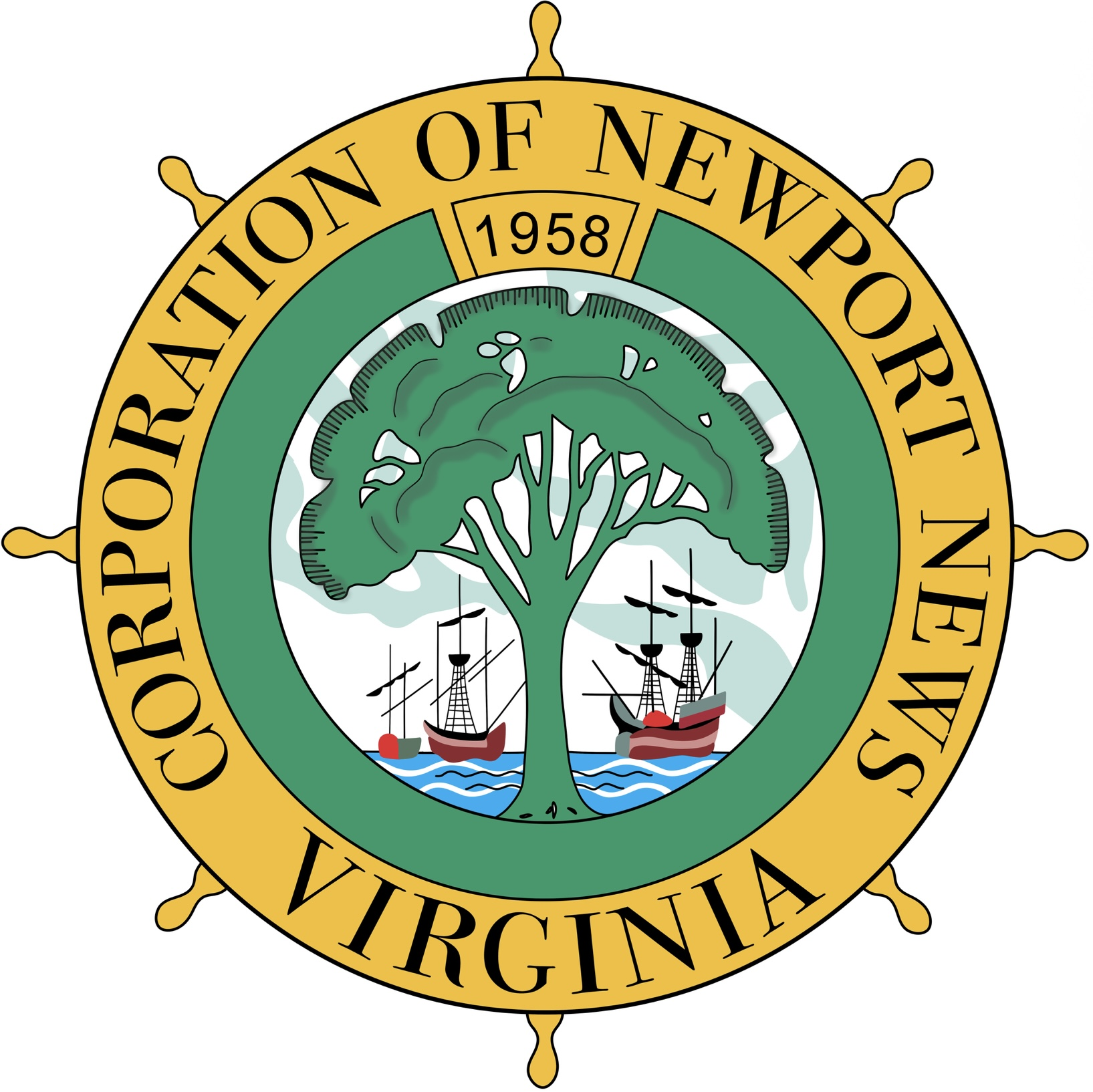
- Flag Seal
- Interactive map of Newport News
- Location within Virginia Location within the United States
- Coordinates: 37°4′15″N 76°29′4″W
- Country: United States
- State: Virginia
- Settled: 1691
- Incorporated: 1896

Government
  - Mayor: Phillip Jones (D)

Area
  - Independent city: 119.63 sq mi (309.83 km^{2})
  - Land: 69.00 sq mi (178.70 km^{2})
  - Water: 50.63 sq mi (131.13 km^{2}) 42.3%
- Elevation: 15 ft (4.6 m)

Population (2020)
  - Independent city: 186,247
  - Estimate (2025): 183,230 ▼
  - Rank: 140th In the United States; 5th In Virginia
  - Density: 2,699.62/sq mi (1,042.33/km^{2})
  - Urban: 1,439,666
  - Metro: 1,672,319
- Time zone: UTC−5 (EST)
  - Summer (DST): UTC−4 (EDT)
- ZIP code: 23601-23609
- Area codes: 757, 948
- FIPS code: 51-56000
- GNIS feature ID: 1497043
- Website: nnva.gov

Newport News (/ˌnuːpɔːrt -, -pərt -/) is an independent city in southeastern Virginia, United States. At the 2020 census, the population was 186,247. Located in the Hampton Roads region, it is the fifth-most populous city in Virginia and 140th-most populous city in the United States. The city is at the southeastern end of the Virginia Peninsula, on the northern shore of the James River to the river's mouth on the harbor of Hampton Roads.

Most of the area now known as Newport News was once a part of Warwick County, one of the eight original shires of Virginia formed in the British Colony of Virginia by order of Charles I of England in 1634. Newport News was a rural area of plantations and a small fishing village until after the American Civil War. In 1881, fifteen years of rapid development began under the leadership of Collis P. Huntington, whose new Peninsula Extension of the Chesapeake and Ohio Railway opened up means of transportation for the railroad to bring West Virginia bituminous coal to port for coastal shipping. Within a few years, Huntington and his associates also built a large shipyard. Newport News was incorporated in 1896, the new incorporated town. In 1958, by mutual consent by referendum, Newport News was consolidated with Warwick, rejoining the two localities to approximately their pre-1896 geographic size under the more widely-known name of Newport News.

With many residents employed at the expansive Newport News Shipbuilding, the joint U.S. Air Force–Army installation at Joint Base Langley–Eustis, and other military bases and suppliers, the city's economy is very connected to the military. The location on the harbor and along the James River facilitates a large boating industry which can take advantage of its many miles of waterfront. Newport News also serves as a junction between the rails and the sea with the Newport News Marine Terminals located at the East End of the city. Served by major east–west Interstate Highway 64, it is linked to other cities of Hampton Roads by the circumferential Hampton Roads Beltway, which crosses the harbor on two bridge-tunnels. Part of the Newport News/Williamsburg International Airport is in the city limits.

== Etymology ==
The original area near the mouth of the James River was first referred to as Newportes Newes as early as 1621.

The source of the name Newport News is not known with certainty, though it is the oldest English city name in the Americas. Several versions are recorded, and it is the subject of popular speculation locally. Probably the best-known explanation holds that when an early group of Jamestown colonists left to return to England after the Starving Time during the winter of 1609–1610 aboard a ship of Captain Christopher Newport, they encountered another fleet of supply ships under the new Governor Thomas West, 3rd Baron De La Warr, in the James River off Mulberry Island with reinforcements of men and supplies. The new governor ordered them to turn around and return to Jamestown. Under this theory, the community was named for Newport's "good news". Another possibility is that the community may have derived its name from an old English word "news" meaning "new town". At least one source claims that the "New" arose from the original settlement's being rebuilt after a fire.

Another source gave the original name as New Port Newce, named for a person with the name Newce and the town's place as a new seaport. The namesake, Sir William Newce, was an English soldier and originally settled in Ireland. There he had established Newcestown near Bandon, County Cork. He sailed to Virginia with Sir Francis Wyatt in October 1621 and was granted 2,500 acres (1,012 ha) of land. He died two days later. His brother, Capt. Thomas Newce, was given "600 acres at Kequatan, now called Elizabeth Cittie." A partner Daniel Gookin completed founding the settlement.

In his 1897 two-volume work Old Virginia and her Neighbors, American historian John Fiske writes:

... several old maps where the name is given as Newport Ness, being the mariner's way of saying Newport Point.

The fact that the name formerly appeared as "Newport's News" is verified by numerous early documents and maps, and by local tradition. The change to Newport News came about through usage; by 1851 the Post Office Department sanctioned "New Port News" (written as three words) as the name of the first post office. In 1866 it approved the name as "Newport News", the current form.

== History ==
=== European settlement ===
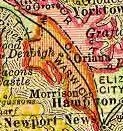
Warwick County (shaded in orange on this 1895 map) was originally one of the eight shires created in colonial Virginia in 1634

During the 17th century, shortly after founding of Jamestown, Virginia, in 1607, English settlers explored and began settling the areas adjacent to Hampton Roads. In 1610, Sir Thomas Gates seized a nearby Native American village, which became known as Kecoughtan. At that time, settlers began clearing land along the James River (the eastern most section of which was called Hampton Roads) for plantations, including the present area of Newport News.

In 1619, the area of Newport News was included in one of four huge corporations of the Virginia Company of London. It became known as Elizabeth Cittie and extended west all the way to Skiffe's Creek (currently the border between Newport News and James City County). Elizabeth Cittie included all of present-day South Hampton Roads.

By 1634, the English colony of Virginia consisted of a population of approximately 5,000 inhabitants. It was divided into eight shires of Virginia, which were renamed as counties shortly thereafter. The area of Newport News became part of Warwick River Shire, which became Warwick County in 1637. The first courthouse was located near the shores of the James River at Warwick Town near Denbigh Plantation. In 1810, the county seat was at Denbigh.

=== Build-up to Incorporation ===
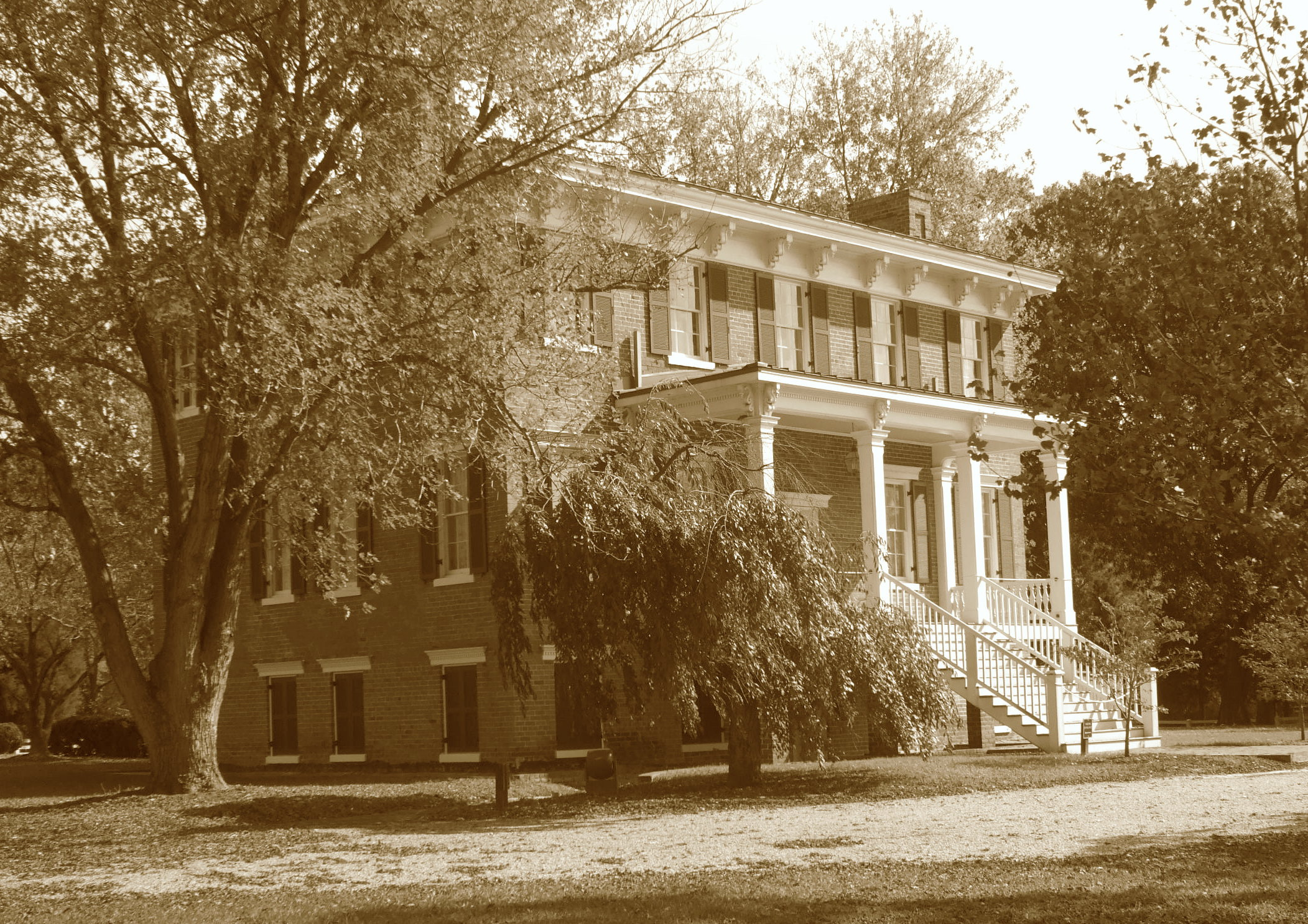
Lee Hall, built in 1859 by Richard Lee

Newport News was a rural area of plantations and a small fishing village until after the American Civil War. The area that formed the present-day southern end of Newport News had long been established as an unincorporated town. After Reconstruction (the period after the American Civil War) the new City of Newport News was essentially founded by California merchant Collis P. Huntington. Huntington, one of the Big Four associated with the Central Pacific Railroad, in California, formed the western part of the country's First transcontinental railroad. He was recruited by former Confederate General Williams Carter Wickham to become a major investor and guiding light for a southern railroad. He helped complete the Chesapeake and Ohio Railway to the Ohio River in 1873.

Huntington knew the railroad could transport coal eastbound from West Virginia's untapped natural resources. His agents began acquiring land in Warwick County in 1865. In the 1880s, he oversaw extension of the C&O's new Peninsula Subdivision, which extended from the Church Hill Tunnel in Richmond southeast down the peninsula through Williamsburg to Newport News, where the company developed coal piers on the harbor of Hampton Roads. On October 19, 1881, the first train to ever depart from Newport News left Lee Hall Depot on temporary tracks and arrived at Yorktown for the 'Cornwallis Surrender Centennial Celebration", a commemoration of the British defeat at the Battle of Yorktown.

His next project was to develop Chesapeake Dry Dock & Construction Company, known from 1890 as the Newport News Shipbuilding & Dry Dock Co. The shipbuilding was originally intended to build boats to transition goods from the rails to the seas, but would quickly grow from additional work from the US Navy, including building the two Kearsarge class battleships and the USS Illinois (BB-7) by 1900. With time, it would become the world's largest shipyard.

Construction of the railroad and establishment of the great shipyard brought thousands of workers and associated development. A rapid building boom occurred, including Hotel Warwick, churches, a newspaper, banks, and a courthouse. From 1888 to 1896, the county seat of Warwick County, Virginia was moved to Newport News area, reflecting the growing importance of the area. On January 16, 1896, Newport News incorporated as an independent city, fully separate of Warwick County. It was one of only a few cities in Virginia to be newly established without earlier incorporation as a town. (Virginia has had an independent city political subdivision since 1871.) Walter A. Post served as the city's first mayor.

=== 1900s ===
In 1907 President Theodore Roosevelt sent the Great White Fleet on its round-the-world voyage. NNS had already built seven of that fleet's 16 battleships. In 1906 the revolutionary HMS Dreadnought launched a great additional naval buildup worldwide, and the Newport News would directly benefit from that work, leading all the way up to World War I.

From 1912 to 1914, Collis Huntingon's nephew, Henry E. Huntington, assumed leadership of the shipyard. Huntington Park, developed after World War I near the northern terminus of the James River Bridge, is named for him.

Albert Lloyd Hopkins, president of Newport News Shipbuilding at that time, was killed May 7, 1915 while traveling to England on shipyard business aboard RMS Lusitania, which was torpedoed by a German submarine. Homer L. Ferguson became president of the company, and would see it through both World Wars. During World War I, Newport News was headquarters to the Hampton Roads Port of Embarkation. Between 1918 and 1920 NNS delivered 25 destroyers to the US Navy.

In 1917, after being contracted by the US Navy, Newport News Shipbuilding hired thousands of workers from across the country to fulfill this contract. However, it was not long after this that the city of Newport News began to suffer a housing crisis. So as not to impede on the contract and the war effort as a whole, Congress funded the very first government-built planned community. This community, made up of 473 English-Village-Styled homes, would become the historic Hilton Village neighborhood.

The city grew in territory through the annexation of parts of Warwick County and also of the town of Kecoughtan in adjoining Elizabeth City County in 1927.

Collis Huntington's son, Archer M. Huntington and his wife, sculptor Anna Hyatt Huntington, developed the Mariners' Museum beginning in 1932. They created a natural park and the community's Mariners' Lake in the process. A major feature of Newport News, the Mariners' Museum has grown to become one of the largest and finest maritime museums in the world.

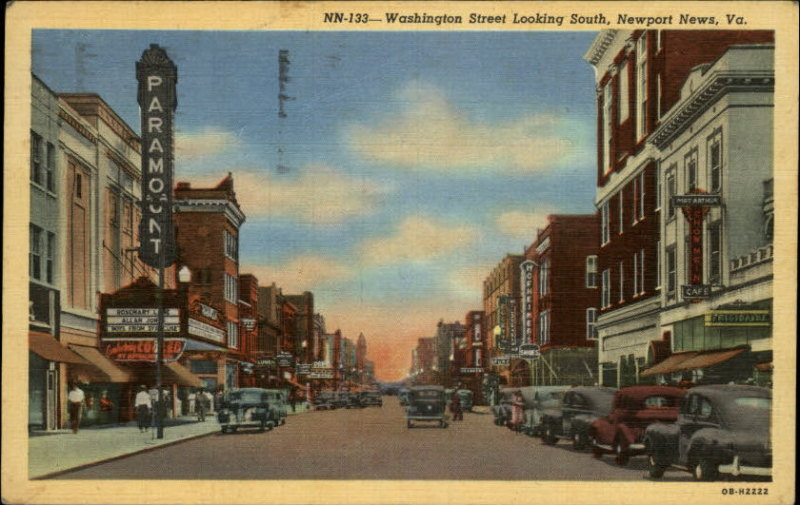
Washington Avenue, downtown, in the 1940s

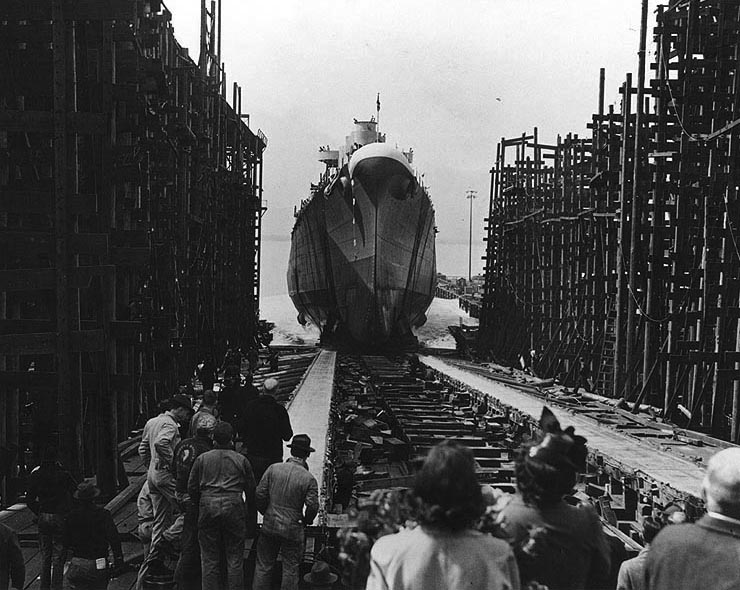
The newly constructed USS Birmingham is launched from the Newport News yards in 1942

In World War II, Newport News would again be the headquarters for the reactivated Hampton Roads Port of Embarkation.

Although fashionable housing and businesses developed in downtown, the increase in industry and the development of new suburbs pushed and pulled retail and residential development to the west and north after World War II. Such suburban development was aided by national subsidization of highway construction and was part of a national trend to newer housing.

In 1958, the citizenry of the cities of Warwick and Newport News voted by referendum to consolidate the two cities, choosing to assume the better-known name of Newport News. The merger created the third largest city by population in Virginia, with a 65 square miles (168 km^{2}) area. The boundaries of the City of Newport News today are essentially the boundaries of the original Warwick River Shire and the traditional one of Warwick County, with the exception of minor border adjustments with neighbors.

In July 1989, the United States Navy commissioned the third naval vessel named after the city with the entry of the Los Angeles-class nuclear submarine USS Newport News, built at Newport News Shipbuilding, into active service. The ship was initially commanded by CDR. Mark B. Keef; the city held a public celebration of the event, which was attended by Vice President of the United States Dan Quayle. In conjunction with this milestone, a song was written by a city native and formally adopted by Newport News City Council in July 1989. The lyrics appear with permission from the author:

(First verse): Harbor of a thousand ships/Forger of a nation's fleet/Gateway to the New World/Where ocean and river meet
(Chorus): Strength wrought from steel/And a people's fortitude/Such is the timeless legacy/Of a place called Newport News
(Second verse): Nestled in a blessed land/Gifted with a special view/Forever home for ev'ry man/With a spirit proud and true
(repeat chorus to fade)

=== 2000s ===
Despite city efforts at large-scale revitalization, by the beginning of the 21st century, the downtown area consisted largely of the coal export facilities, the shipyard, and municipal offices. It is bordered by some harbor-related smaller businesses and lower income housing.

The city began to explore New Urbanism as a way to develop areas midtown. City Center at Oyster Point was developed out of a small portion of the Oyster Point Business Park. It opened in phases from 2003 through 2005. The city invested $82 million of public funding in the project. Closely following Oyster Point, Port Warwick opened as an urban residential community in the new midtown business district. Fifteen hundred people now reside in the Port Warwick area. It includes a 3-acre (1.2 ha) city square where festivals and events take place.

In January 2023, a six-year-old shot his teacher Abby Zwerner in an elementary school in Newport News.

== Geography ==
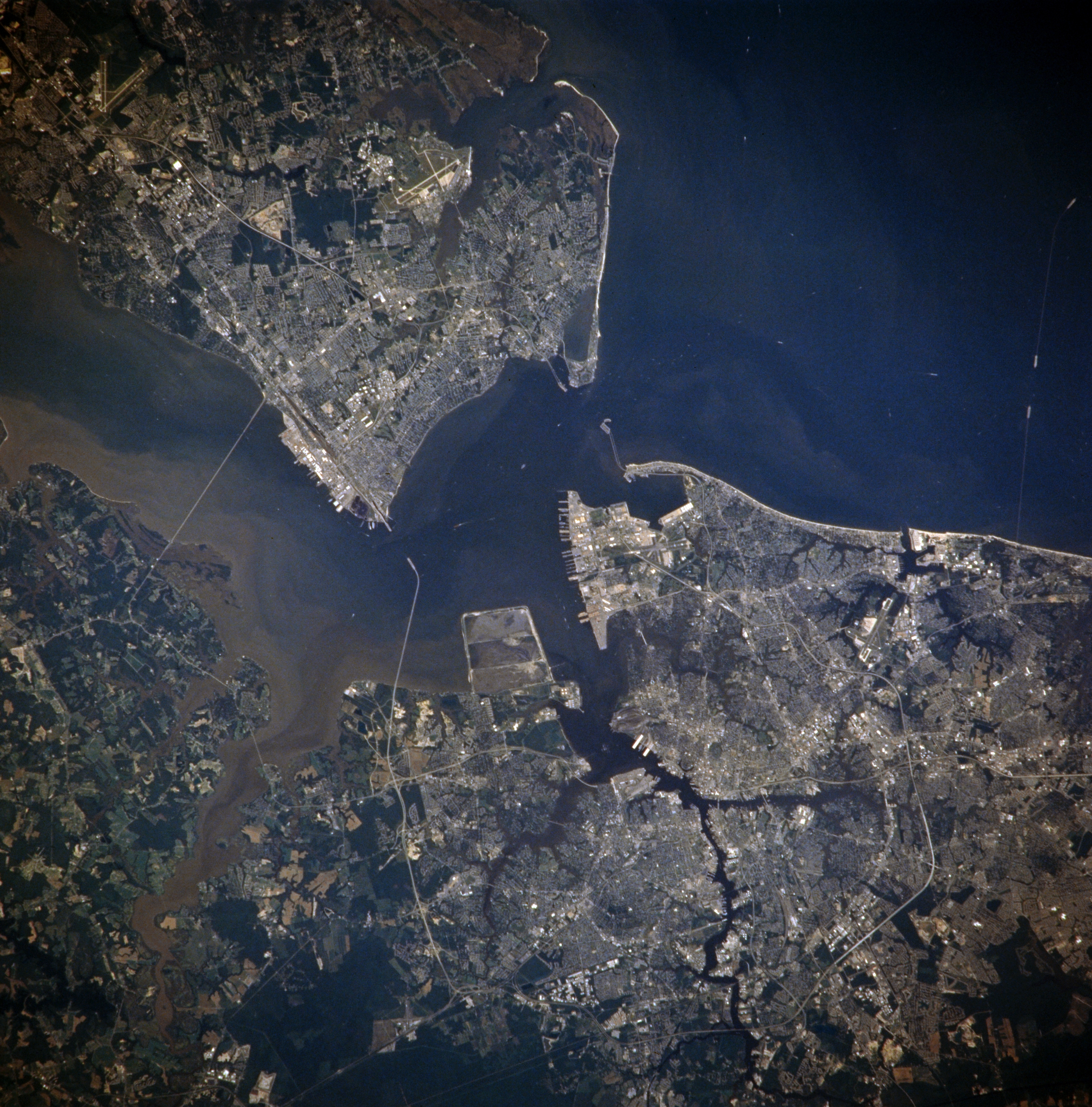
Newport News, Hampton, Portsmouth and Norfolk, from space, July 1996. Newport News is seen in the upper-left quadrant.

Newport News is located at 37°4′15″N 76°29′4″W (37.071046, −76.484557). According to the United States Census Bureau, the city has a total area of 119.62 square miles (309.8 km^{2}), of which 68.99 square miles (178.7 km^{2}) is land and 50.63 square miles (131.1 km^{2}) (42.3%) is water.

The city is located at the Peninsula side of Hampton Roads in the Tidewater region of Virginia, bordering the Atlantic Ocean. The Hampton Roads Metropolitan Statistical Area (officially known as the Virginia Beach-Norfolk-Newport News, VA-NC MSA) is the 37th largest in the nation with a 2014 population estimate of 1,716,624. The area includes the Virginia cities of Norfolk, Virginia Beach, Chesapeake, Hampton, Newport News, Poquoson, Portsmouth, Suffolk, Williamsburg, and the counties of Gloucester, Isle of Wight, James City, Mathews, Surry, and York, as well as the North Carolina counties of Currituck and Gates. Newport News serves as one of the business centers on the Peninsula. The city of Norfolk is recognized as the central business district, while the Virginia Beach oceanside resort district and Williamsburg are primarily centers of tourism.

Newport News shares land borders with James City County on the northwest, York County on the north and northeast, and Hampton on the east. Newport News shares water borders with Portsmouth on the southeast and Suffolk on the south across the Hampton Roads Area, and Isle of Wight County on the southwest and west and Surry County on the northwest across the James River.

=== Cityscape ===
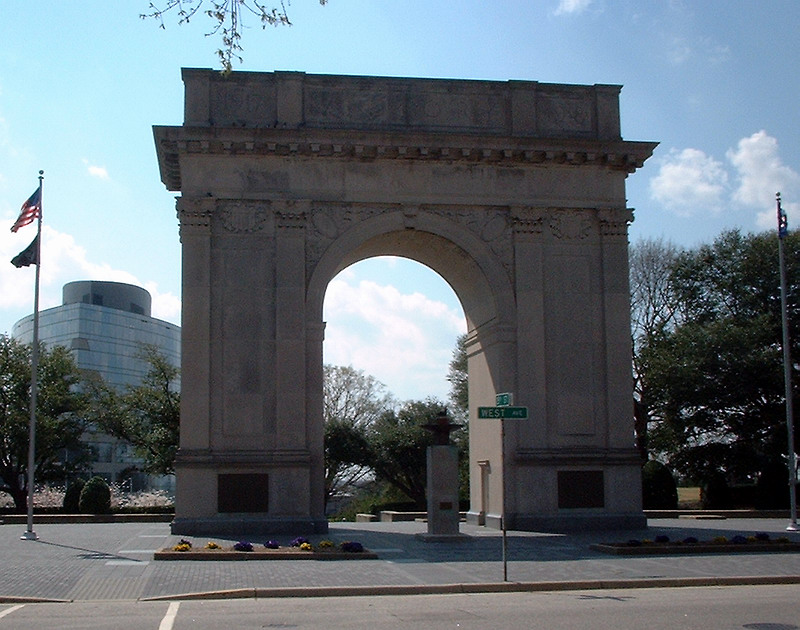
Newport News Victory Arch in downtown Newport News

The city's downtown area was part of the earliest developed area which was initially incorporated as an independent city in 1896. The earlier city portions also included the "East End" or "Southeast" community, which was predominantly black American, the "North End" and the shipyard and coal piers. The town of Kecoughtan in Elizabeth City County was annexed by Newport News in 1927, extending the city along Hampton Roads from Salter's Creek to Pear Avenue. After World War II, public housing projects and lower income housing were built to improve housing in what came to be known as the East End or "The Bottom" by locals. The city expanded primarily westward where land was available and highways were built. While the shipyard and coal facilities, and other smaller harbor-oriented businesses have remained vibrant, the downtown area went into substantial decline. Crime problems have plagued the nearby lower-income residential areas.

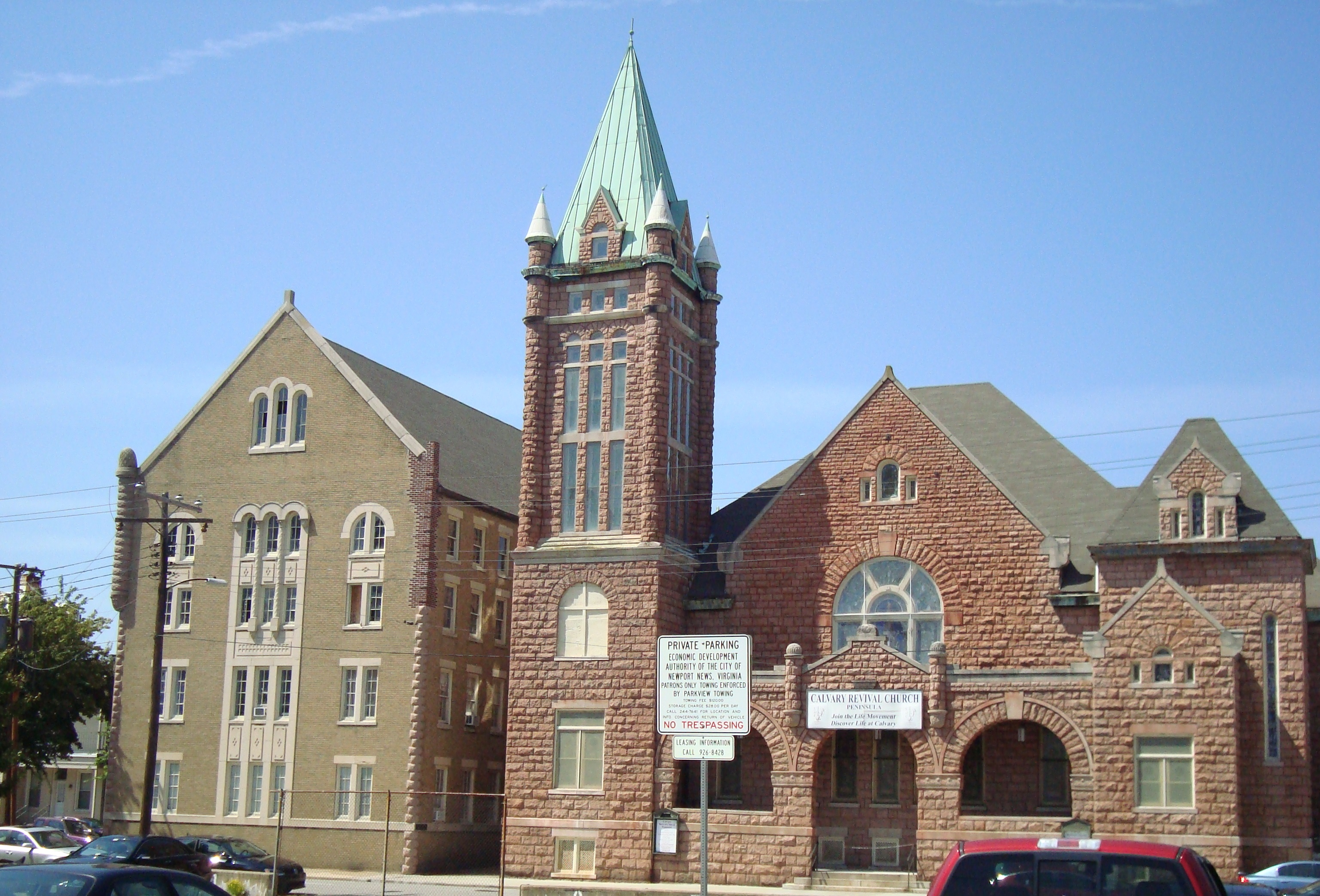
Original First Baptist Church in downtown Newport News

West of the traditional downtown area, another early portion of the city was developed as Huntington Heights. In modern times been called the North End. Developed primarily between 1900 and 1935, North End features a wealth of architectural styles and eclectic vernacular building designs. Extending along west to the James River Bridge approaches, it includes scenic views of the river. A well-preserved community, the North End is an historic district listed on the National Register of Historic Places and the Virginia Landmarks Register.

At the extreme northwestern edge adjacent to Skiffe's Creek and the border with James City County is the Lee Hall community, which retains historical features including the former Chesapeake and Ohio Railway station which served tens of thousands of soldiers based at what became nearby Fort Eustis during World War I and World War II. The larger-than-normal rural two-story frame depot is highly valued by rail fans and rail preservationists.

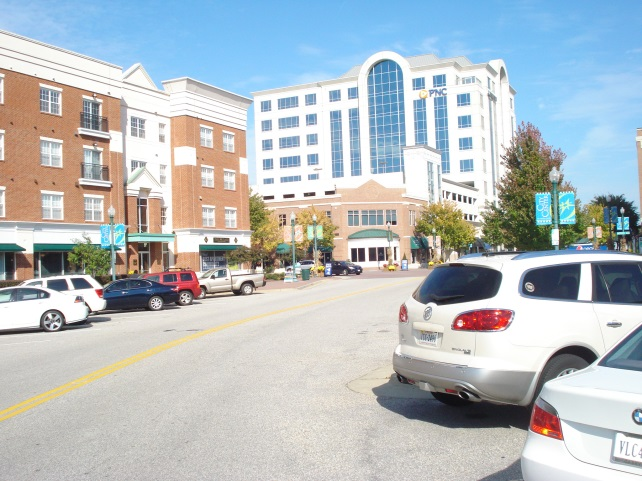
View along Town Center Drive at City Center at Oyster Point, October 2012

In downtown Newport News, the Victory Arch, built to commemorate the Great War, sits on the downtown waterfront. The "Eternal Flame" under the arch was cast by Womack Foundry, Inc. in the 1960s. It was hand crafted by the Foundry's founder and president, Ernest D. Womack. The downtown area has a number of landmarks and architecturally interesting buildings, which for some time were mostly abandoned in favor of building new areas in the northwest areas of the city (a strategy aided by tax incentives in the postwar years).

City leaders are working to bring new life into this area, by renovating and building new homes and attracting businesses. The completion of Interstate 664 restored the area to access and through traffic which had been largely rerouted with the completion of the Hampton Roads Bridge-Tunnel connecting neighboring Hampton with the Southside in 1958 and discontinuance of the Newport News-Norfolk ferry service at that time. The larger capacity Monitor-Merrimac Memorial Bridge-Tunnel and the rebuilt James River Bridge each restored some accessibility and through traffic to the downtown area.

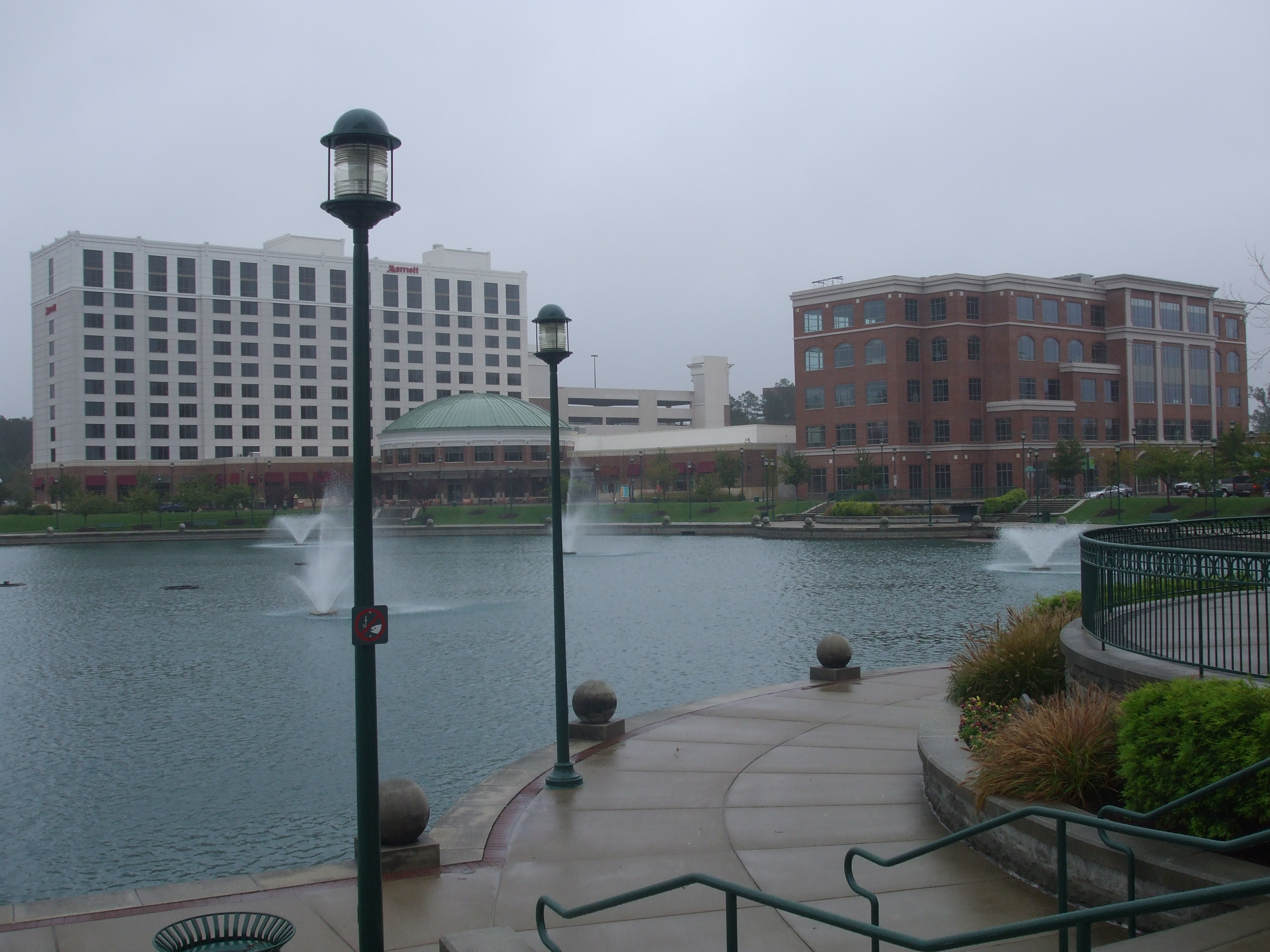
View across the fountain at City Center at Oyster Point

Much of the newer commercial development has been along the Warwick Boulevard and Jefferson Avenue corridors, with newer planned industrial, commercial, and mixed development such as Oyster Point, Kiln Creek and the City Center. While the downtown area had long been the area of the city that offered the traditional urban layout, the city has supported a number of New Urbanism projects. One is Port Warwick, named after the fictional city in William Styron's novel, Lie Down in Darkness. Port Warwick includes housing for a broad variety of citizens, from retired persons to off-campus housing for Christopher Newport University students. Also included are several high-end restaurants and upscale shopping.

City Center at Oyster Point, located near Port Warwick, has been touted as the new "downtown" because of its new geographic centrality on the Virginia Peninsula, its proximity to the retail/business nucleus of the city, etc. Locally, it is often called simply "City Center". Nearby, the Virginia Living Museum recently completed a $22.6 million expansion plan.

Newport News is also home to a small Korean ethnic enclave on Warwick Boulevard near the Denbigh neighborhood on the northern end of the city. Although it lacks the density and character of larger, more established enclaves, it has been referred to as "Little Seoul"—being the commercial center for the Hampton Roads Korean community.

=== Neighborhoods ===
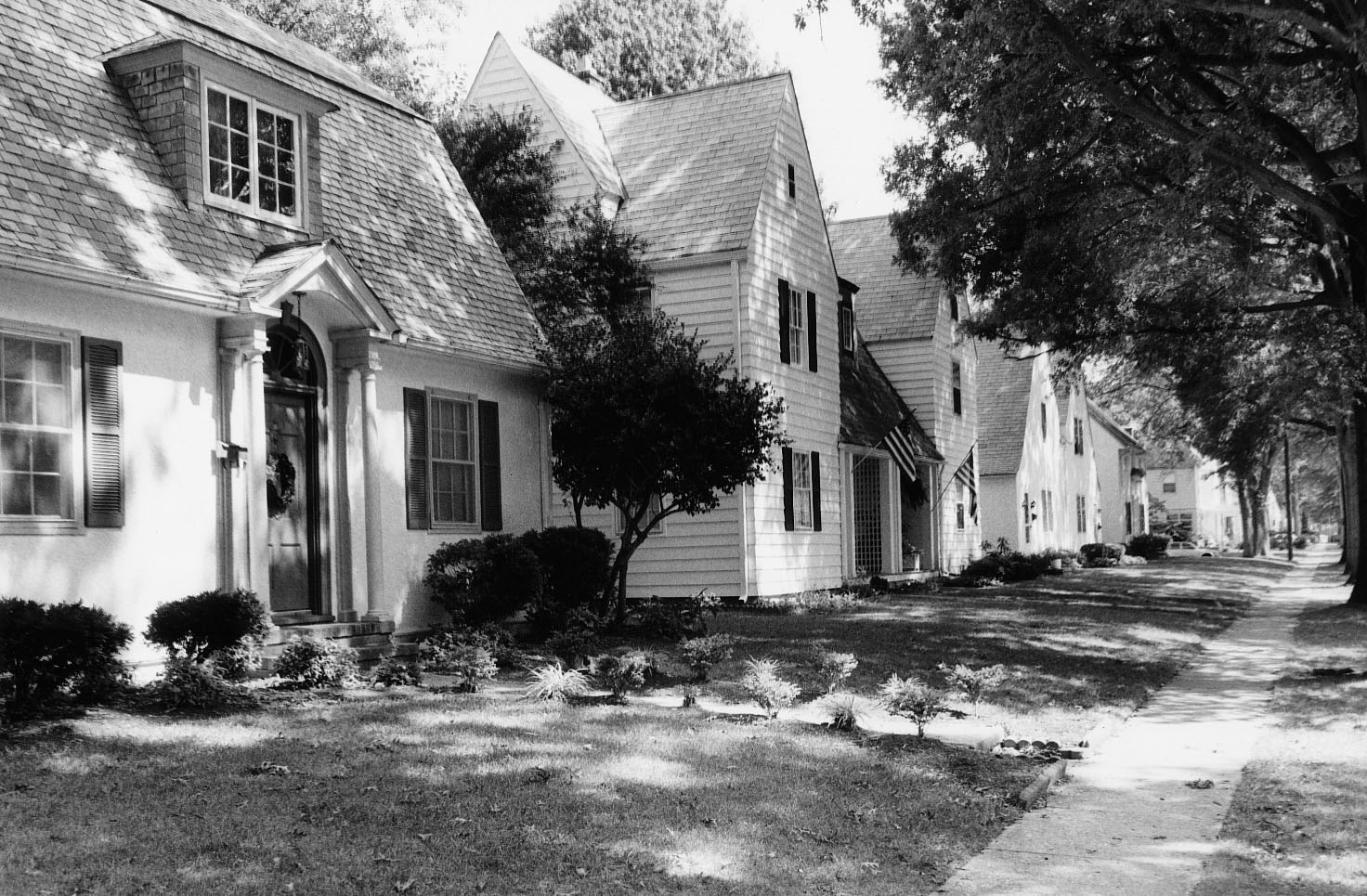
Hilton Village

Newport News has many distinctive communities and neighborhoods within its boundaries, including Brandon Heights, Brentwood, City Center, Colony Pines, Christopher Shores-Stuart Gardens, Denbigh, Glendale, East End, Hidenwood, Hilton Village, Hunter's Glenn, Beaconsdale, Ivy Farms, North End Huntington Heights (Historic District – roughly from 50th to 75th street, along the James River), Jefferson Avenue Park, Kiln Creek, Lee Hall, Menchville, Maxwell Gardens, Morrison (also known as Gum Grove), Newmarket Village, Newsome Park, Oyster Point, Parkview, old North Newport News (Center Ave. area), Port Warwick, Richneck, Riverside, Shore Park, Summerlake, Village Green, Windsor Great Park and Warwick. Some of these neighborhoods are located in the former City of Warwick and Warwick County.

=== Climate ===
Newport News is located in the humid subtropical climate zone, with cool to mild winters, and hot, humid summers. Due to the inland location, throughout the year, highs are 2 to 3 °F (1.1 to 1.7 °C) warmer and lows 1 to 2 °F (0.6 to 1.1 °C) cooler than areas to the southeast. Snowfall averages 5.8 inches (15 cm) per season, and the summer months tend to be slightly wetter. The geographic location of the city, with respect to the principal storm tracks, favours fair weather, as it is south of the average path of storms originating in the higher latitudes, and north of the usual tracks of hurricanes and other major tropical storms.

Climate data for Newport News, Virginia (1981–2010 normals)
Month	Jan	Feb	Mar	Apr	May	Jun	Jul	Aug	Sep	Oct	Nov	Dec	Year
Mean daily maximum °F (°C)	49.5 (9.7)	52.9 (11.6)	60.7 (15.9)	71.1 (21.7)	78.5 (25.8)	86.2 (30.1)	89.6 (32.0)	87.4 (30.8)	82.2 (27.9)	72.5 (22.5)	63.3 (17.4)	53.4 (11.9)	70.6 (21.4)
Mean daily minimum °F (°C)	31.8 (−0.1)	32.6 (0.3)	39.5 (4.2)	47.8 (8.8)	57.0 (13.9)	66.3 (19.1)	70.3 (21.3)	68.8 (20.4)	62.7 (17.1)	51.7 (10.9)	43.0 (6.1)	34.6 (1.4)	50.5 (10.3)
Average precipitation inches (mm)	3.33 (85)	3.01 (76)	3.44 (87)	3.33 (85)	3.74 (95)	3.81 (97)	4.71 (120)	5.35 (136)	4.79 (122)	3.47 (88)	3.08 (78)	3.38 (86)	45.44 (1,155)
Average snowfall inches (cm)	2.4 (6.1)	2.1 (5.3)	0.3 (0.76)	0 (0)	0 (0)	0 (0)	0 (0)	0 (0)	0 (0)	0 (0)	0 (0)	1.0 (2.5)	5.8 (14.66)
Average precipitation days (≥ 0.01 in)	10.4	9.5	10.6	10.1	10.6	9.9	11.1	10.1	8.8	7.6	8.5	9.8	116.8
Average snowy days (≥ 0.1 in)	1.6	1.3	0.4	0.1	0	0	0	0	0	0	0	0.5	3.9
Mean monthly sunshine hours	170.5	178.0	229.4	252.0	272.8	279.0	279.0	260.4	231.0	207.7	177.0	161.2	2,698
Source: NOAA (temperature and total precipitation normals at Newport News Int'l, all others at Norfolk Int'l), HKO (sun only 1961–1990)

== Demographics ==
Historical population
Census	Pop.	Note	%±
1890	1,234		—
1900	19,635		1,491.2%
1910	20,205		2.9%
1920	35,596		76.2%
1930	34,417		−3.3%
1940	37,067		7.7%
1950	42,358		14.3%
1960	113,788		168.6%
1970	138,177		21.4%
1980	144,903		4.9%
1990	170,045		17.4%
2000	180,150		5.9%
2010	180,719		0.3%
2020	186,247		3.1%
2025 (est.)	183,230	▼	−1.6%
U.S. Decennial Census; 1790–1960 1900–1990; 1990–2000; 2018 Estimate 2020

=== Racial and ethnic composition ===
Newport News city, Virginia – Racial and ethnic composition Note: the US Census treats Hispanic/Latino as an ethnic category. This table excludes Latinos from the racial categories and assigns them to a separate category. Hispanics/Latinos may be of any race.
Race / Ethnicity (NH = Non-Hispanic)	Pop 1980	Pop 1990	Pop 2000	Pop 2010	Pop 2020	% 1980	% 1990	% 2000	% 2010	% 2020
White alone (NH)	94,633	104,424	93,624	83,153	71,250	65.31%	61.41%	51.97%	46.01%	38.26%
Black or African American alone (NH)	45,177	56,450	69,538	71,727	76,870	31.18%	33.20%	38.60%	39.69%	41.27%
Native American or Alaska Native alone (NH)	323	523	685	682	571	0.22%	0.31%	0.38%	0.38%	0.31%
Asian alone (NH)	1,906	3,811	4,112	4,858	6,230	1.32%	2.24%	2.28%	2.69%	3.35%
Native Hawaiian or Pacific Islander alone (NH)	x	x	199	284	404	x	x	0.11%	0.16%	0.22%
Other race alone (NH)	277	127	356	308	1,124	0.19%	0.07%	0.20%	0.17%	0.60%
Mixed race or Multiracial (NH)	x	x	4,041	6,117	10,510	x	x	2.24%	3.38%	5.64%
Hispanic or Latino (any race)	2,587	4,710	7,595	13,590	19,288	1.79%	2.77%	4.22%	7.52%	10.36%
Total	144,903	170,045	180,150	180,719	186,247	100.00%	100.00%	100.00%	100.00%	100.00%

=== 2020 census ===
As of the 2020 census, Newport News had a population of 186,247. The median age was 34.4 years. 22.3% of residents were under the age of 18 and 13.9% of residents were 65 years of age or older. For every 100 females there were 94.6 males, and for every 100 females age 18 and over there were 92.1 males age 18 and over.

99.6% of residents lived in urban areas, while 0.4% lived in rural areas.

There were 75,630 households in Newport News, of which 29.8% had children under the age of 18 living in them. Of all households, 35.4% were married-couple households, 21.6% were households with a male householder and no spouse or partner present, and 36.0% were households with a female householder and no spouse or partner present. About 32.7% of all households were made up of individuals and 10.5% had someone living alone who was 65 years of age or older.

There were 81,901 housing units, of which 7.7% were vacant. The homeowner vacancy rate was 1.9% and the rental vacancy rate was 8.4%.

Racial composition as of the 2020 census
Race	Number	Percent
White	74,676	40.1%
Black or African American	78,687	42.2%
American Indian and Alaska Native	940	0.5%
Asian	6,356	3.4%
Native Hawaiian and Other Pacific Islander	441	0.2%
Some other race	8,892	4.8%
Two or more races	16,255	8.7%
Hispanic or Latino (of any race)	19,288	10.4%

=== 2010 census ===
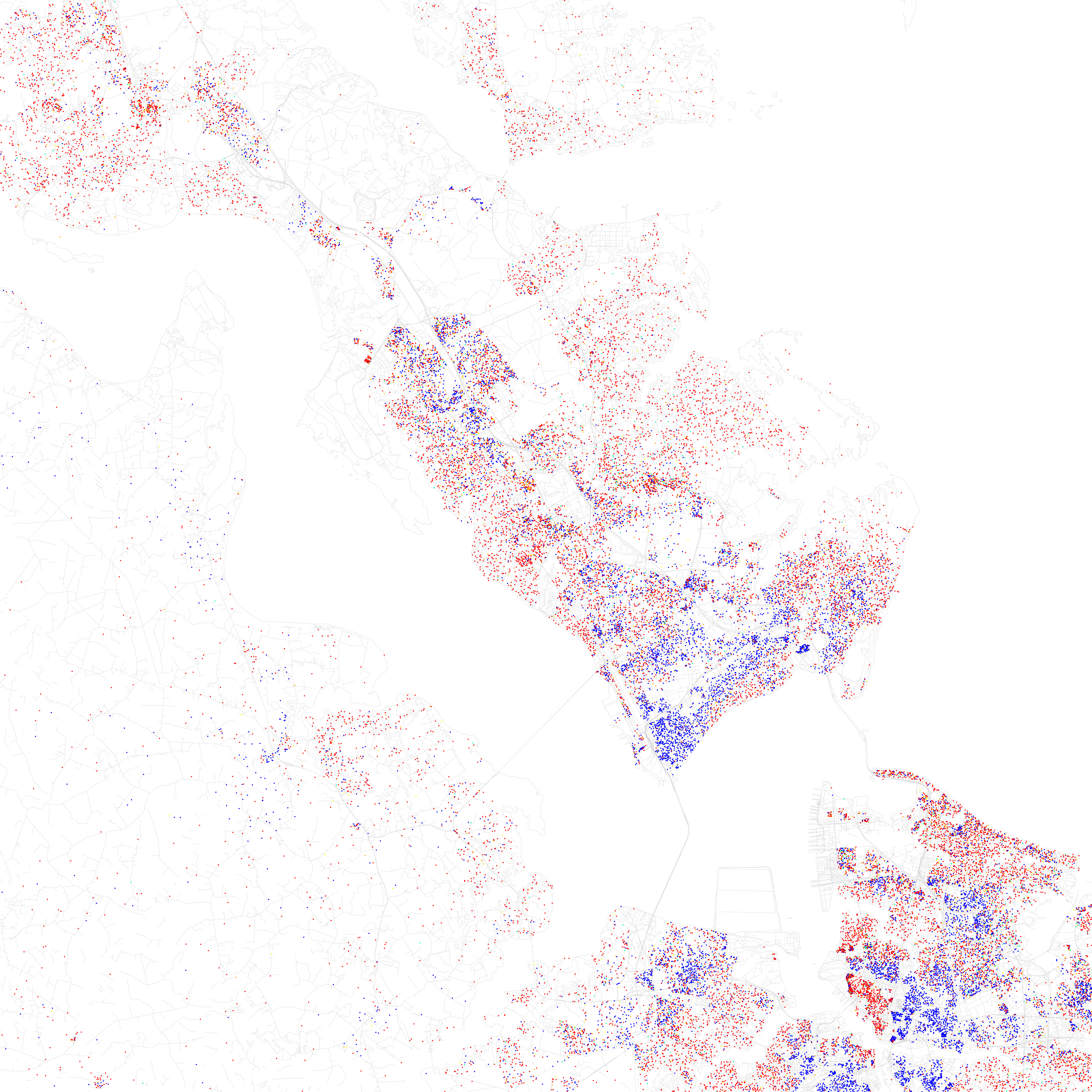
Map of racial distribution in Newport News, 2010 U.S. census. Each dot represents 25 people: White, Black, Asian, Hispanic or Other (yellow).

As of the census of 2010, there were 180,719 people, 69,686 households, and 46,341 families residing in the city. The population density was 2,637.9 inhabitants per square mile (1,018.5/km^{2}). There were 74,117 housing units at an average density of 1,085.3 units per square mile (419.0 units/km^{2}). The racial makeup of the city was 49.0% White, 40.7% African American, 0.5% Native American, 2.7% Asian, 0.2% Pacific Islander, 2.7% from other races, and 4.3% from two or more races. Hispanic or Latino of any race were 7.5% of the population (2.5% Puerto Rican, 2.5% Mexican, 0.4% Cuban, 0.3% Panamanian, 0.2% Dominican, 0.2% Guatemalan, 0.2% Honduran).

There were 69,686 households, out of which 35.7% had children under the age of 18 living with them, 44.6% were married couples living together, 17.9% had a female householder with no husband present, and 33.5% were non-families. 27.0% of all households were made up of individuals, and 8.1% had someone living alone who was 65 years of age or older. The average household size was 2.50 and the average family size was 3.04.

The age distribution is: 27.5% under the age of 18, 11.5% from 18 to 24, 32.2% from 25 to 44, 18.8% from 45 to 64, and 10.1% who were 65 years of age or older. The median age was 32 years. For every 100 females, there were 93.8 males. For every 100 females age 18 and over, there were 90.3 males.

The median income for a household in the city was $36,597, and the median income for a family was $42,520. Males had a median income of $31,275 versus $22,310 for females. The per capita income for the city was $17,843. About 11.3% of families and 13.8% of the population were below the poverty line, including 20.6% of those under age 18 and 9.8% of those age 65 or over.

== Crime ==
Crime (per 100,000 people)	Newport News, Virginia (2007)	National average
Murder	15.8	5.6
Rape	51.3	32.2
Robbery	288.9	195.4
Assault	336.2	340.1
Burglary	892.1	814.5
Automobile theft	377.4	526.5

Newport News experienced 20 murders giving the city a murder rate of 10.8 per 100,000 people in 2005. In 2006, there were 19 murders giving the city a rate of 10.5 per 100,000 people. In 2007 the city had 28 murders with a rate of 15.8 per 100,000 people.

The total crime index rate for Newport News is 434.7; the United States average is 320.9. According to the Congressional Quarterly Press' "2008 City Crime Rankings: Crime in Metropolitan America," Newport News ranked as the 119th most dangerous city larger than 75,000 inhabitants. The neighborhood with the highest crime rates in Newport News is the East End.

== Economy ==
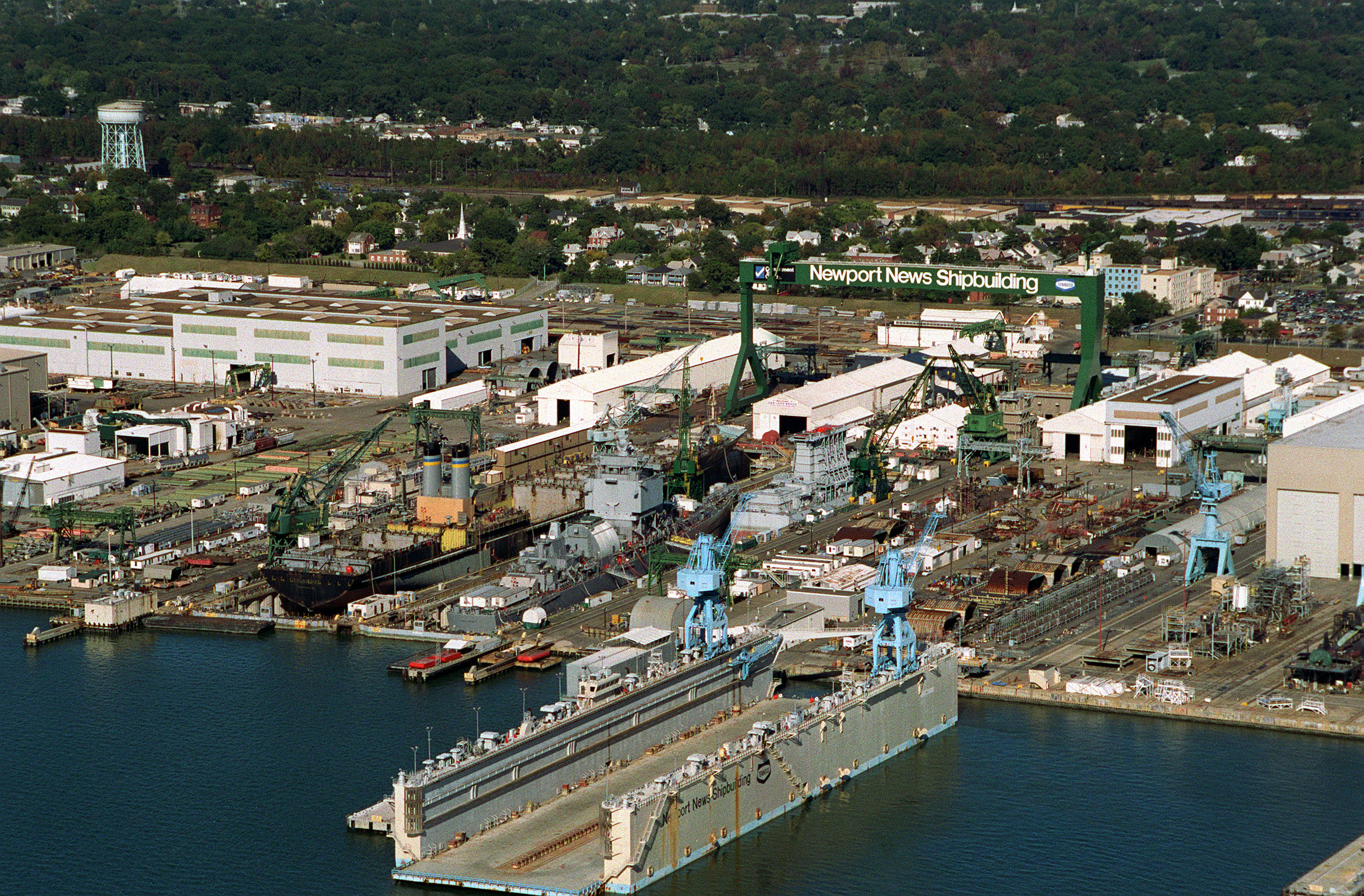
An aerial view of the Newport News Shipbuilding & Drydock shipyard on the James River

Among the city's major industries are shipbuilding, military, and aerospace. Newport News Shipbuilding, owned by Huntington Ingalls Industries, and the large coal piers supplied by railroad giant CSX Transportation, the modern Fortune 500 successor to the Chesapeake and Ohio Railway (C&O). Miles of the waterfront can be seen by automobiles crossing the James River Bridge and Monitor-Merrimac Memorial Bridge-Tunnel, which is a portion of the circumferential Hampton Roads Beltway, linking the city with each of the other major cities of Hampton Roads via Interstate 664 and Interstate 64. Many U.S. defensive industry suppliers are based in Newport News, and these and nearby military bases employ many residents, in addition to those working at the shipyard and in other harbor-related vocations.

Newport News plays a role in the maritime industry. At the end of CSX railroad tracks lies the Newport News Marine Terminal. Covering 140 acres (0.57 km^{2}), the Terminal has heavy-lift cranes, warehouse capabilities, and container cranes.

Newport News' location next to Hampton Roads along with its rail network has provided advantages for the city. The city houses two industrial parks which enabled manufacturing and distribution to take root in the city. As technology-oriented companies flourished in the 1990s, Newport News became a regional center for technology companies.

Additional companies headquartered out of Newport News include Ferguson Enterprises and L-3 Flight International Aviation.

Newport News Shipbuilding serves as the city's largest employer with over 24,000 employees. Fort Eustis employs over 10,000, making it the second largest employer in the city. Newport News School System creates over 5,000 jobs and is the city's third largest employer.

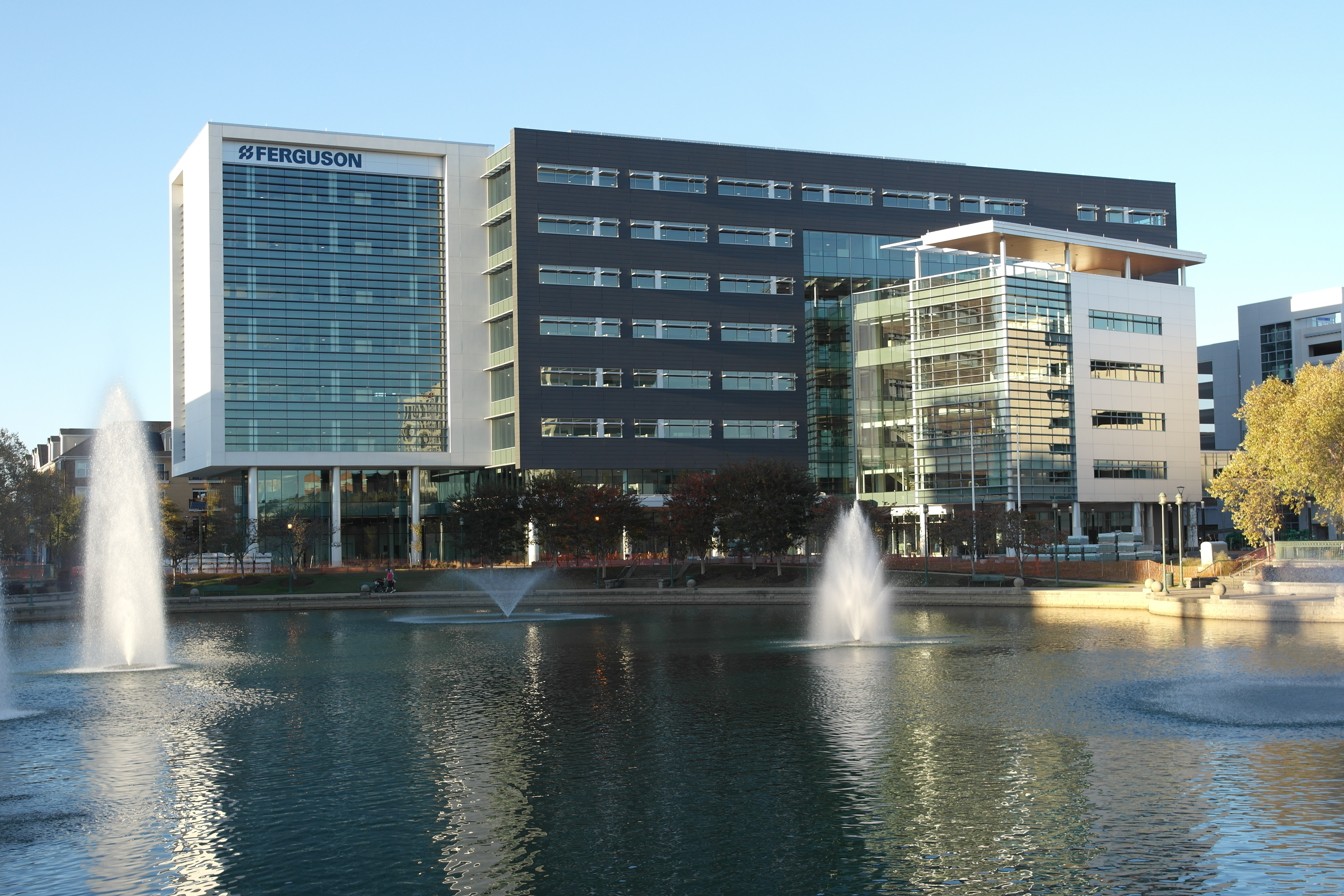
Ferguson Enterprises' new corporate headquarters in City Center at Oyster Point

Established during World War I at historic Mulberry Island, the base at Fort Eustis in modern times houses the United States Army Training and Doctrine Command and other activities.

In adjacent localities, other U.S. military facilities include Langley Air Force Base, Naval Weapons Station Yorktown, Camp Peary, USCG Training Center Yorktown and the now-deactivated Fort Monroe. Other installations are located across the James River in South Hampton Roads, including the world's largest naval base, Naval Station Norfolk.

Research and education play a role in the city's economy. The Thomas Jefferson National Accelerator Facility (TJNAF) is housed in Newport News. TJNAF employs over 675 people and more than 2,000 scientists from around the world conduct research using the facility. Formerly named the Continuous Electron Beam Accelerator Facility (CEBAF), its stated mission is "to provide forefront scientific facilities, opportunities and leadership essential for discovering the fundamental structure of nuclear matter; to partner in industry to apply its advanced technology; and to serve the nation and its communities through education and public outreach."

== Culture ==
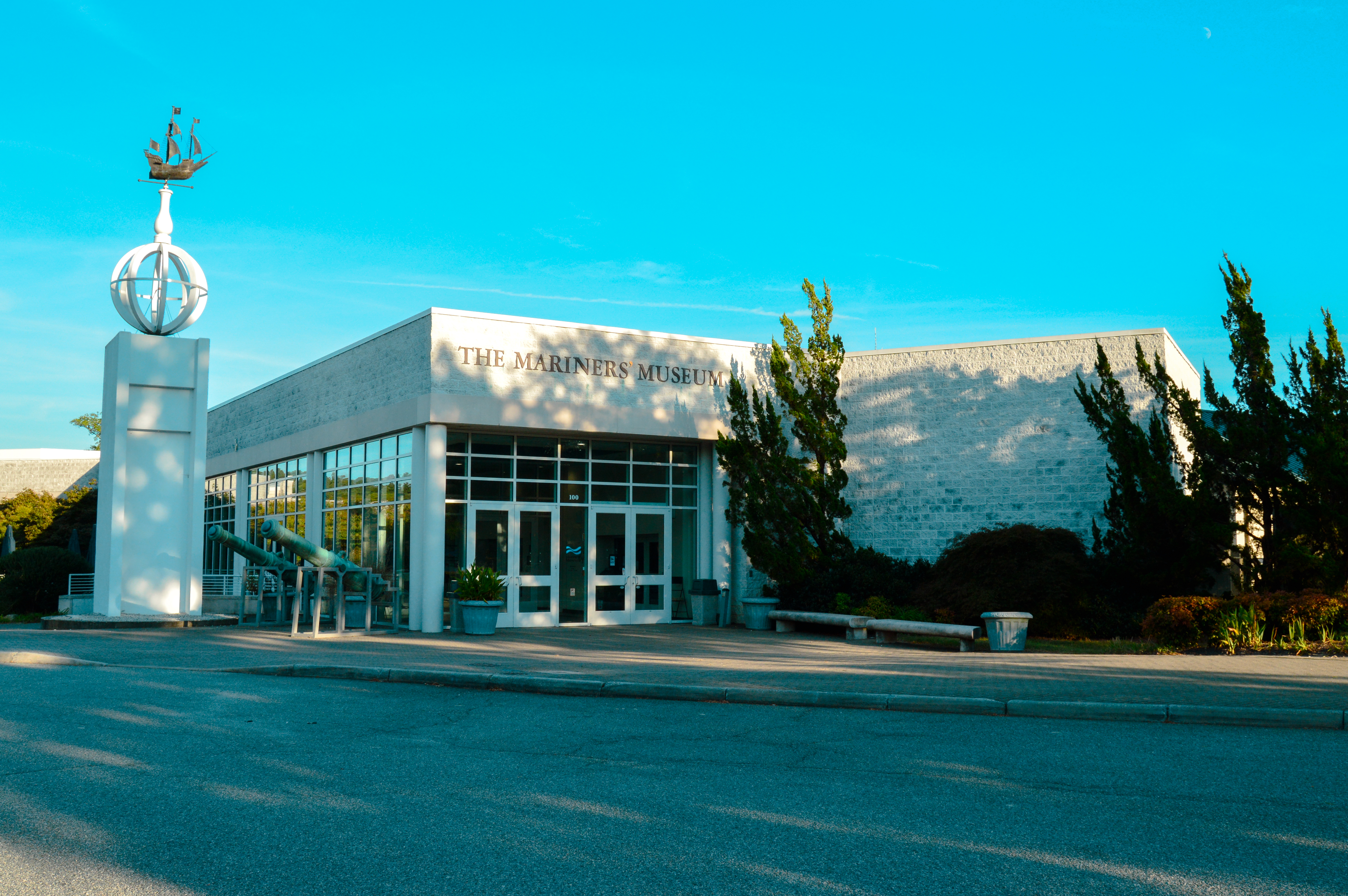
The Mariners' Museum

People who have grown up in the Hampton Roads area have a unique Tidewater accent which is found among natives of Eastern Virginia and Maryland. Vowels have a longer pronunciation than in most accents.

Near the city's western end, a historic C&O railroad station, as well as American Civil War battle sites near historic Lee Hall along U.S. Route 60 and several plantations dating to the 19th century have all been protected. Many are located along the roads leading to Yorktown and Williamsburg, where many sites of the Historic Triangle are of both American Revolutionary War and Civil War significance. The first modern duel of ironclad warships, the Battle of Hampton Roads, took place not far off Newport News Point in 1862.

Recovered artifacts from USS Monitor are displayed at the Mariners' Museum, one of the more notable museums of its type in the world. The museum's collection totals approximately 32,000 artifacts, international in scope, which include ship models, scrimshaw, maritime paintings, decorative arts, figureheads and engines. The museum also owns and maintains a 550-acre park on which is located the Noland Trail, and the 167-acre Mariners' Lake.

The Virginia War Museum covers American military history. The museum's collection includes weapons, vehicles, artifacts, uniforms and posters from various periods of American history. Highlights of the museum's collection include a section of the Berlin Wall and the outer wall from Dachau Concentration Camp.

The Peninsula Fine Arts Center contains a rotating gallery of art exhibits. The center also maintains a permanent "Hands on For Kids" gallery designed for children and families to interact in what the center describes as "a fun, educational environment that encourages participation with art materials and concepts."

PFAC, which had been open for 58 years, closed at the end of 2020, as its merger with Christopher Newport University's new addition to the Ferguson Center to house the arts center is completed.

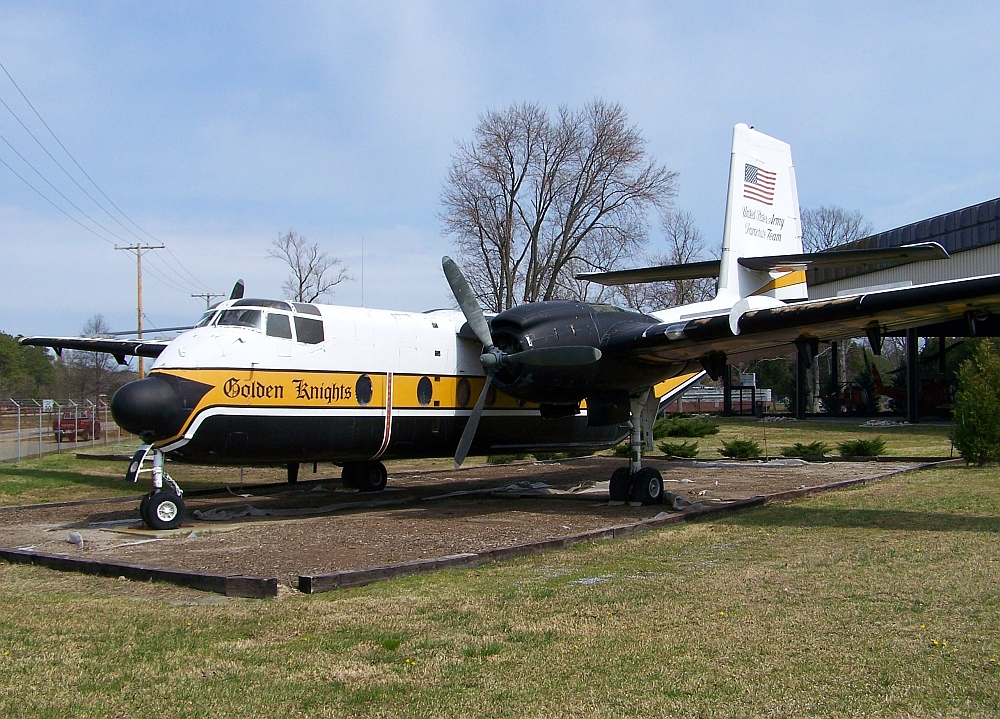
A C-7 Caribou at the U.S. Army Transportation Museum, Fort Eustis, Virginia

The U.S. Army Transportation Museum is a United States Army museum of vehicles and other U.S. Army transportation-related equipment and memorabilia. Located on the grounds of Fort Eustis, The museum reflects the history of the Army, especially of the United States Army Transportation Corps and includes close to 100 military vehicles such as land vehicles, watercraft and rolling stock, including stock from the Fort Eustis Military Railroad. It is officially dedicated to General Frank S. Besson, Jr., who was the first four-star general to lead the transportation command, and extends over 6 acres (24,000 m^{2}) of land, air and sea vehicles and indoor exhibits. The exhibits cover transportation and its role in US Army operations, including topic areas from the American Revolutionary War through operations in Afghanistan.

The Ferguson Center for the Arts is a theater and concert hall on the campus of Christopher Newport University. The complex fully opened in September 2005 and contains three distinct, separate concert halls: the Concert Hall, the Music and Theatre Hall, and the Studio Theatre.

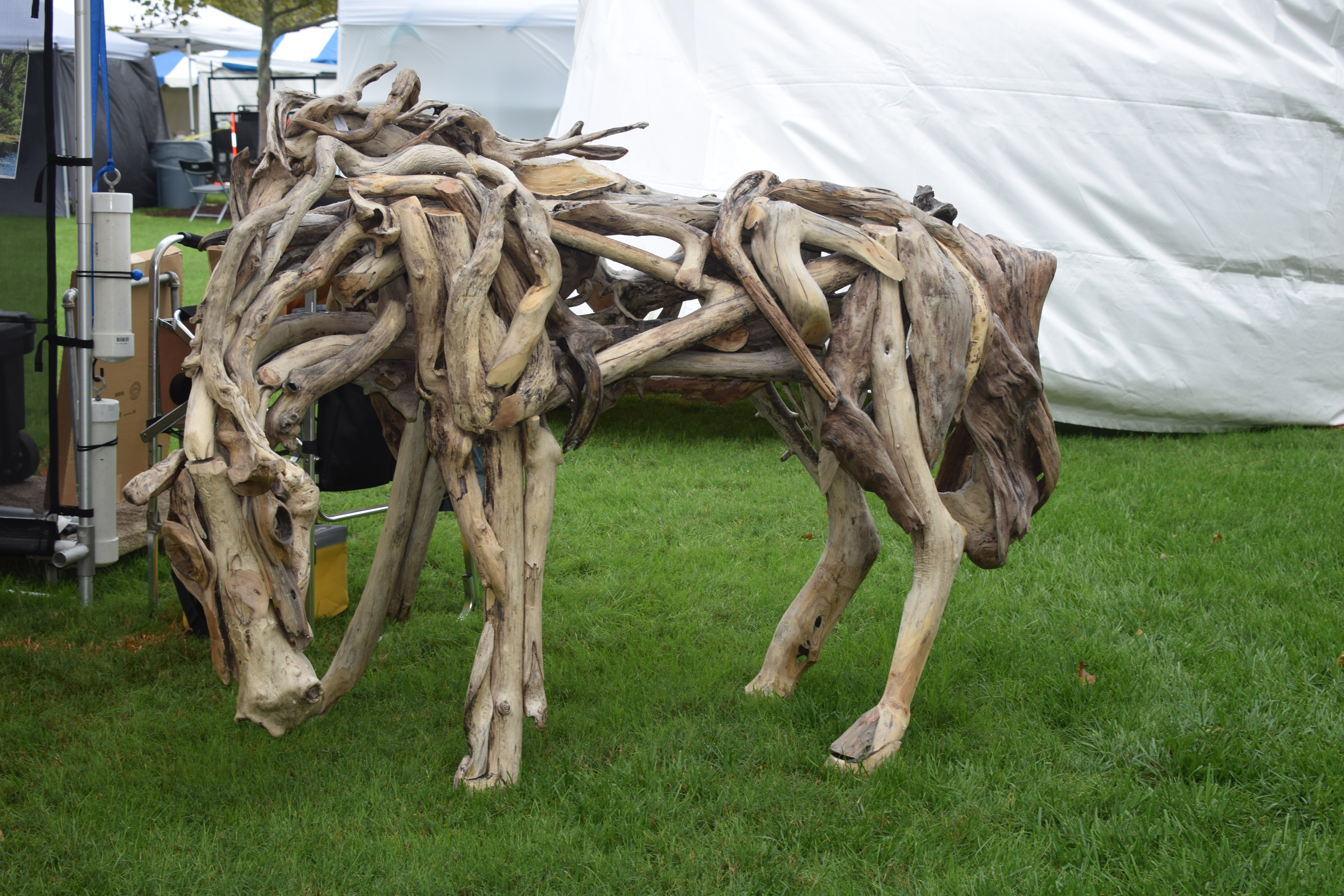
Driftwood art at the Port Warwick Art and Sculpture Festival

The Port Warwick area hosts the annual Port Warwick Art and Sculpture Festival where art vendors gather in Styron Square to show and sell their art. Judges have the chance to name artwork best of the Festival.

The Virginia Living Museum is an outdoor living museum combining aspects of a native wildlife park, science museum, aquarium, botanical preserve, and planetarium.

== Parks and recreation ==
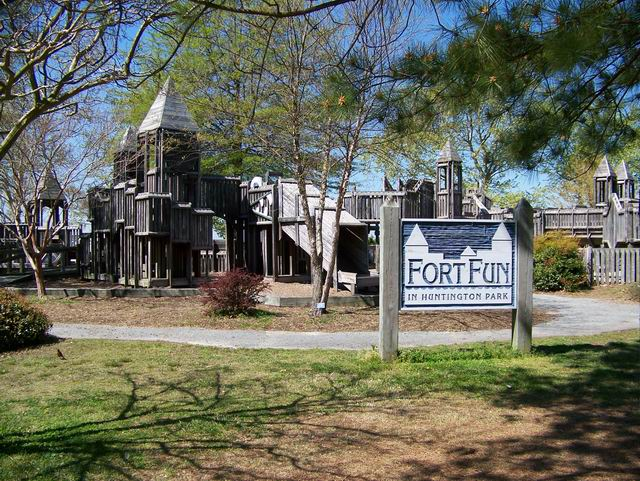
Fort Fun in Huntington Park

Newport News Parks is responsible for the maintenance of 32 city parks. The smallest is less than half an acre (2,000 m^{2}). The largest, Newport News Park, is 7,711 acres (31.21 km^{2}). They are scattered throughout the city, from Endview Plantation in the northern end of the city to King-Lincoln Park in the southern end near the Monitor-Merrimac Memorial Bridge-Tunnel. The parks offer services to visitors, ranging from traditional park services like camping and fishing to activities like archery and disc golf.

Newport News Park is in the northern part of the city. The city's golf course lies in the park along with camping and outdoor activities. There are over 30 miles (48 km) of trails in the Newport News Park complex. It has a 5.3 miles (8.5 km) multi-use bike path. The park offers bicycle and helmet rental, and requires helmet use by children under 14. Newport News Park offers an archery range, disc golf course, and an "aeromodel flying field" for remote-controlled aircraft, complete with a 400 ft (120 m) runway.

The city supplies two public boat ramps for its citizens: Denbigh Park Boat Ramp and Hilton Pier/Ravine.

Denbigh Park allows access into the Warwick River, a tributary of the James River. Denbigh Park also offers a small fishing pier. Hilton Pier offers a small beach in addition to a ravine. Croaker and trout are the fish primarily caught during the summer months and the pier is accessible to visitors in wheelchairs.

== Sports ==
Newport News has been the home to sports franchises, including the semi-pro football Mason Dixon League's former teams Peninsula Pirates, Peninsula Poseidons, and the Virginia Crusaders.

Currently, Christopher Newport University Captains field fourteen sports and compete in the Capital Athletic Conference in Division III of the NCAA.

High school sports (especially football) play a large role in the city's culture. The city's stadium, John B. Todd Stadium, houses five high schools’ worth of football games usually spread over Thursday, Friday, and Saturday nights. The stadium also holds the schools' track and field meets.

The city is also home to Lionsbridge FC, an American soccer club (USL League Two), which plays at Christopher Newport University during the summer months. Lionsbridge FC

Additional sports options can be found just outside Newport News. On the collegiate level, the College of William and Mary, Hampton University, Norfolk State University and Old Dominion University offer NCAA Division I athletics. Virginia Wesleyan College also provides sports at the NCAA Division III level. The Peninsula Pilots play just outside the city limits at War Memorial Stadium in Hampton. The Pilots play in the Coastal Plain League, a summer baseball league. In Norfolk, the Norfolk Tides of the International League and the Norfolk Admirals of the ECHL. In Virginia Beach, the Hampton Roads Piranhas field men's and women's professional soccer teams. The Atlantic 10 Conference had been headquartered in Newport News since 2009.

The city has hosted a marathon annually since 2015. The One City Marathon was hosted virtually in 2021. The course spans the length of Newport News and begins in Newport News Park. It ends at the Victory Arch downtown, and the course weaves through Mariners' Museum Park, CNU and Hilton Village. The course is USTAF certified and can be used as a qualifier for the Boston Marathon. There also is a half marathon, relay, 8K and one-mile fun run.

== Government and politics ==
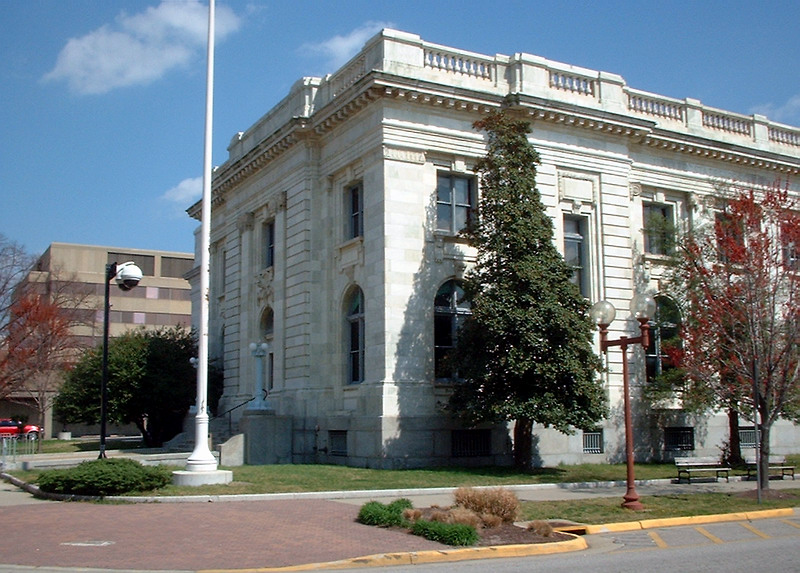
Federal Building and Main Post Office on West Avenue

Newport News is an independent city with services that counties and cities in Virginia provide, such as courts and social services. Newport News has both a police department and a city sheriff's department.

Newport News operates under a council-manager form of government, which consists of a city council with representatives from three districts serving in a legislative and oversight capacity, as well as a popularly elected, at-large mayor. The city manager serves as head of the executive branch and supervises all city departments and executing policies adopted by the council. Citizens in the three wards elect two council representatives each to serve a four-year term. The city council meets at City Hall twice a month.

Newport News has a federal courthouse for the United States District Court for the Eastern District of Virginia. A new courthouse will be constructed in the future. Additionally, Newport News has its own General District and Circuit Courts which convene downtown. The city is in the Virginia's 3rd congressional district, served by U.S. Representative Robert C. Scott.

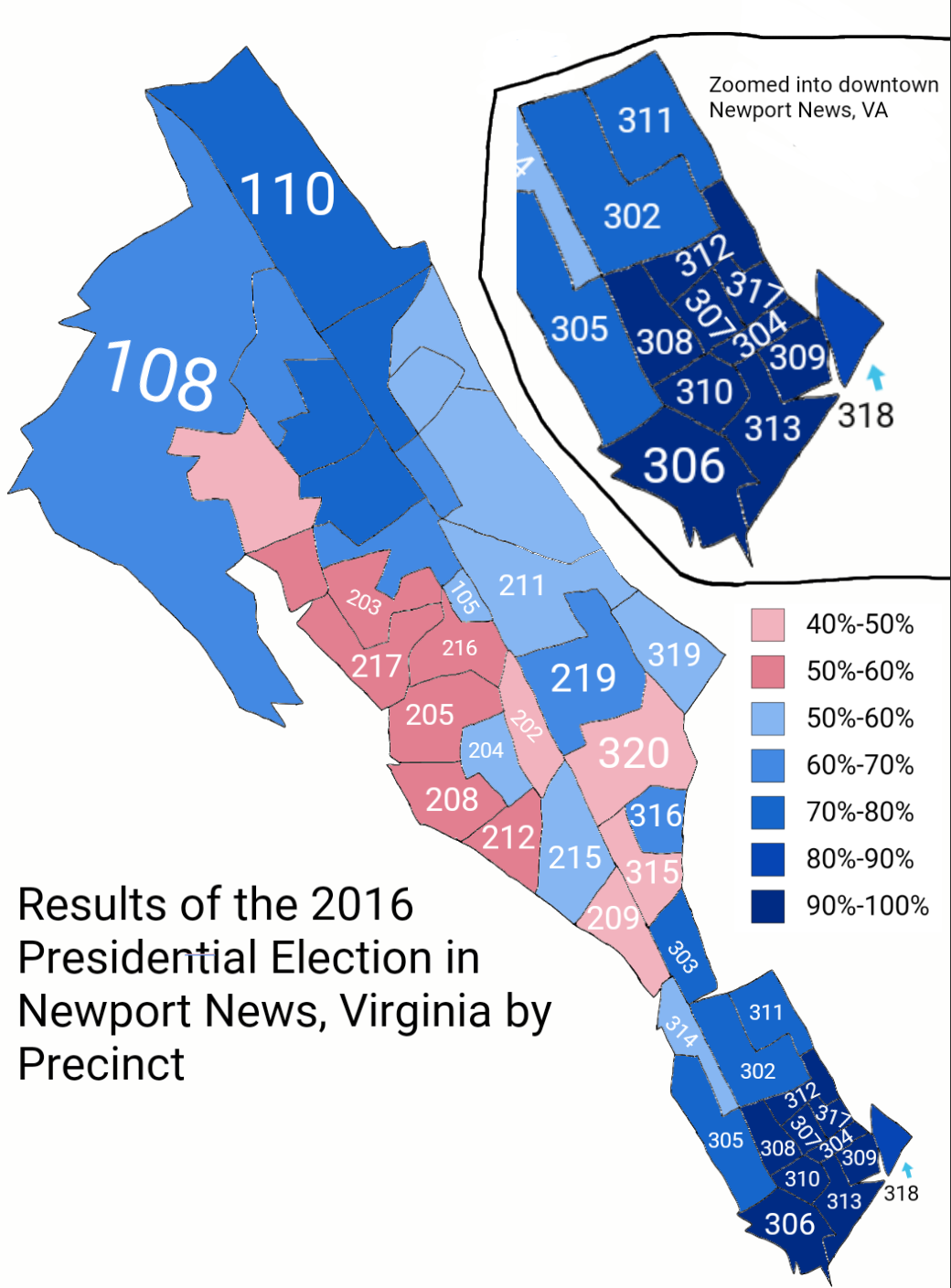
Map showing the results of the 2016 presidential election in Newport News, Virginia, by precinct

Prior to 1956, Newport News voted in line with a Solid South county except for 1928 when anti-Catholic voting boosted Herbert Hoover to a victory in the county & statewide. From 1956 to 2004, it became a swing county, but became increasingly Democratic towards the end of that stretch. Since 2008, it has become solidly Democratic. In each presidential election from 2008 on, Democratic candidates have won at least 60% of the county's vote while no Republican candidate has cracked 40%. In 2020, Donald Trump achieved the lowest Republican vote share at a presidential election in the city since 1948.

United States presidential election results for Newport News, Virginia
Year	Republican		Democratic		Third party(ies)	
Year	No.	%	No.	%	No.	%
1896	815	53.76%	676	44.59%	25	1.65%
1900	1,108	36.36%	1,896	62.23%	43	1.41%
1904	335	29.36%	744	65.21%	62	5.43%
1908	498	37.84%	788	59.88%	30	2.28%
1912	100	7.52%	938	70.58%	291	21.90%
1916	465	31.74%	939	64.10%	61	4.16%
1920	1,450	45.27%	1,703	53.17%	50	1.56%
1924	917	32.95%	1,574	56.56%	292	10.49%
1928	3,118	61.51%	1,951	38.49%	0	0.00%
1932	1,515	35.20%	2,703	62.80%	86	2.00%
1936	919	18.52%	4,021	81.04%	22	0.44%
1940	863	17.98%	3,907	81.41%	29	0.60%
1944	1,237	23.30%	4,051	76.30%	21	0.40%
1948	1,453	27.73%	3,420	65.28%	366	6.99%
1952	2,769	40.46%	4,051	59.20%	23	0.34%
1956	3,779	53.26%	3,069	43.26%	247	3.48%
1960	10,098	53.56%	8,678	46.02%	79	0.42%
1964	10,584	40.87%	15,296	59.07%	14	0.05%
1968	12,774	34.46%	13,370	36.07%	10,925	29.47%
1972	27,169	67.40%	12,233	30.35%	910	2.26%
1976	20,914	47.01%	23,058	51.83%	520	1.17%
1980	22,423	47.73%	22,066	46.97%	2,493	5.31%
1984	33,614	60.35%	21,834	39.20%	250	0.45%
1988	32,570	59.88%	21,413	39.37%	412	0.76%
1992	26,779	43.83%	25,743	42.14%	8,569	14.03%
1996	23,072	42.50%	27,678	50.98%	3,538	6.52%
2000	27,006	46.70%	29,779	51.50%	1,040	1.80%
2004	32,208	47.40%	35,319	51.98%	425	0.63%
2008	28,667	35.26%	51,972	63.93%	656	0.81%
2012	27,230	34.28%	51,100	64.32%	1,114	1.40%
2016	25,468	33.64%	45,618	60.25%	4,629	6.11%
2020	26,377	32.48%	53,099	65.39%	1,727	2.13%
2024	26,385	34.76%	48,169	63.46%	1,355	1.79%

== Education ==
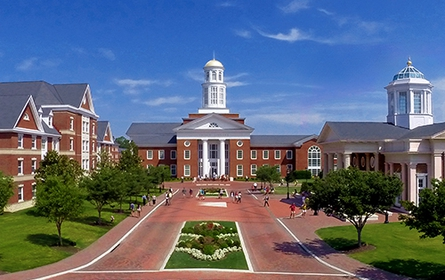
The entrance to Christopher Newport University, featuring the York River Hall, the Trible Library, and the Pope Chapel.

The main provider of primary and secondary education in the city is Newport News Public Schools. The school system includes many elementary schools, six middle schools, and the high schools, Denbigh High School, Heritage High School, Menchville High School, Warwick High School, and Woodside High School. All middle, high schools, and elementary schools are fully accredited. Dutrow Elementary is an example of an elementary school that offers a Talented and Gifted program for fifth graders or rising sixth graders. Crittenden Middle School offers a STEM magnet program to students throughout the district, preparing them for careers in Science, Technology, Engineering and Math. Warwick High School is widely known for its IB program to prepare students at all grade levels for college course levels of thinking.

Several private schools are located in the area, including Denbigh Baptist Christian School, Hampton Roads Academy, Peninsula Catholic High School, and Trinity Lutheran School.

The city contains Christopher Newport University, a public university. Other nearby public universities include Old Dominion University, Norfolk State University and The College of William and Mary and also is home to the private ECPI University. Hampton University, a private university, also sits a few miles from the city limits. Newport News Shipbuilding operates The Apprentice School, a vocational school teaching various shipyard and related trades.

Virginia Peninsula Community College serves as the community college. Located in neighboring Hampton and in nearby Williamsburg, Virginia Peninsula offers college and career training programs. Most institutions in the Hampton Roads areas are home to a variety of students but commuter students make up a large portion.

== Religion ==
As a New South industrial city, Newport News developed a religious diversity greater than neighboring cities. The oldest congregation in the city, First Church of Newport News (Baptist) was organized in 1863, well in advance of the foundation of the city. Railroad connections encouraged Mennonites to establish farms and a colony in Warwick County and a congregation in the city itself. The city was fertile ground for black American evangelists including Lightfoot Solomon Michaux and Daddy Grace. Several synagogues were established in the city, and at least two of its historic church buildings, First Baptist Church and St. Vincent de Paul Catholic Church were added to the National Register of Historic Places.

== Media ==
The City of Newport News operates two local government PEG Channels, Newport News Television (NNTV) and NNTV2. NNTV airs on cable channels Cox 48 & Verizon 19 while NNTV2 is on Cox 46 & Verizon 18. NNTV also operates a YouTube channel of their programming. Residents of Newport News can find programs highlighting local events and various things to do around the city. NNTV airs the City Council Meetings and Planning Commission Meetings live for the public to view while NNTV2 is a bulletin board channel that displays slides for various city events and essential information for residents. NNTV also produces the local Crimeline reports with officers from the Newport News Police Department.

Newport News is also served by several television stations. The Hampton Roads designated market area (DMA) is the 43rd largest in the U.S. with 712,790 homes (0.64% of the total U.S.). The major network television affiliates are WTKR-TV 3 (CBS), WAVY 10 (NBC), WVEC-TV 13 (ABC), WGNT 27 (Independent), WTVZ 33 (MyNetworkTV), WVBT 43 (Fox, with CW on DT2), and WPXV 49 (ION Television) and The Public Broadcasting Service member station is WHRO-TV 15.

Newport News's daily newspaper is the Daily Press. Other papers include the Port Folio Weekly, the New Journal and Guide, the Hampton Roads Business Journal, and the James River Living journal.

Christopher Newport University publishes its own newspaper, The Captain's Log. Hampton Roads Magazine serves as a bi-monthly regional magazine for Newport News and the Hampton Roads area. Hampton Roads Times serves as an online magazine for all the Hampton Roads cities and counties. Newport News is served by a variety of radio stations on the AM and FM dials, with towers located around the Hampton Roads area.

== Infrastructure ==
=== Transportation ===
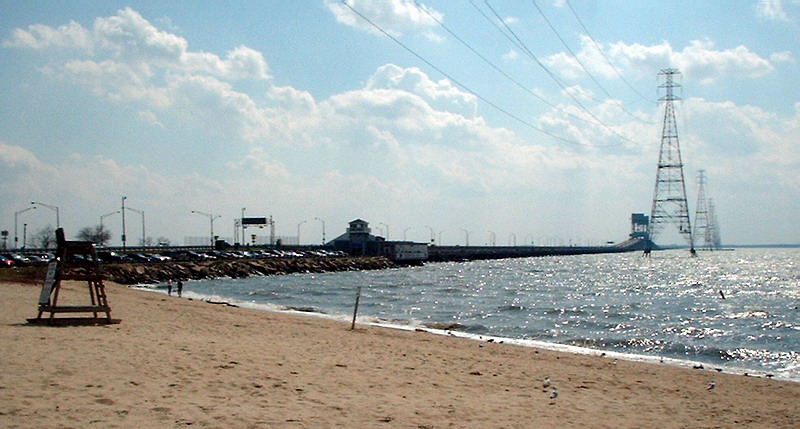
James River Bridge, viewed from Huntington Park Beach

Newport News has an elaborate transportation network, including interstate and state highways, bridges and a bridge-tunnel, freight and passenger railroad service, local transit bus and intercity bus service, and a commercial airport. There are miles of waterfront docks and port facilities.

Newport News is served by three airports. Newport News/Williamsburg International Airport, in Newport News; Norfolk International Airport, in Norfolk; and Richmond International Airport all of which cater to passengers from Hampton Roads.

The primary airport for the Virginia Peninsula is the Newport News/Williamsburg International Airport. As of 2011, it was experiencing a 5th year of record, double-digit growth, making it one of the fastest growing airports in the country. In January 2006, the airport reported having served 1,058,839 passengers. On February 4, 2010, the airport announced a new airline, Frontier Airlines, with direct flights to Denver, Colorado. It is also undergoing a $23 million expansion project. In 2012, Newport News became home to its own airline, PeoplExpress, which launched with headquarters at the Newport News/Williamsburg airport. Its inaugural first flights took place June 30, 2014, and now includes more than seven destinations.

Norfolk International Airport also serves the region. The airport is near the Chesapeake Bay, along the city limits of Norfolk and Virginia Beach. Seven airlines provide nonstop services to 25 destinations. ORF had 3,703,664 passengers take off or land at its facility and 68,778,934 pounds of cargo were processed through its facilities. The Chesapeake Regional Airport provides general aviation services and is on the other side of the Hampton Roads Harbor.

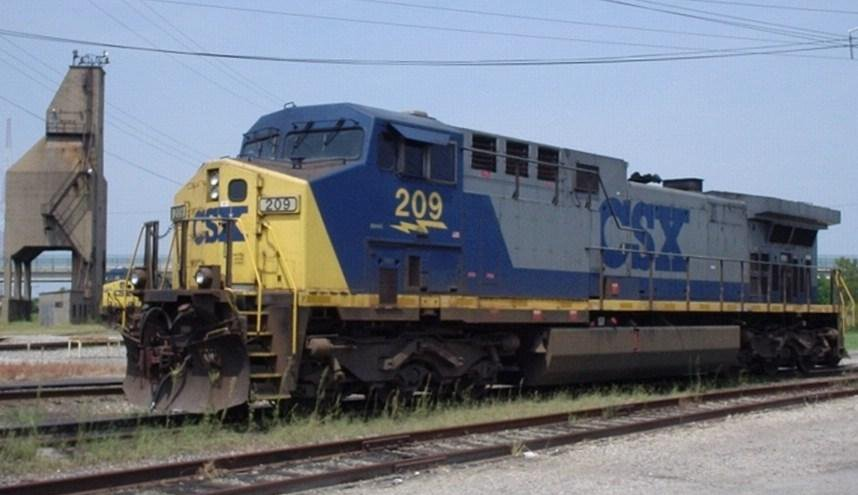
A C&O coaling tower can be seen behind the locomotive

Amtrak serves the city with four trains a day. The line runs west along the Virginia Peninsula to Richmond and points beyond. Connecting buses are available to Norfolk and Virginia Beach. A high-speed rail connection at Richmond to the Northeast Corridor and the Southeast High Speed Rail Corridor is under study.

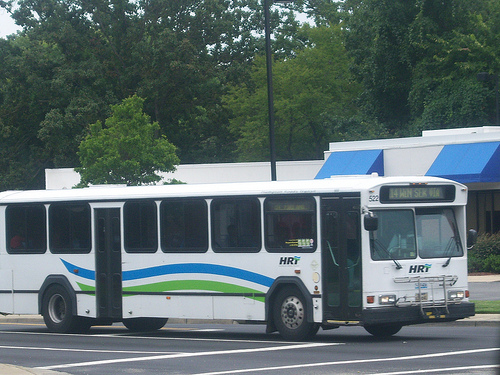
HRT Bus on U.S. Route 258

Intercity bus service is provided by Greyhound Lines (Carolina Trailways) and Virginia Breeze. The bus station is on Warwick Boulevard in the Denbigh area.

Transportation in the city, as well as with other major cities of Hampton Roads is served by a regional bus service, Hampton Roads Transit. A connecting service for local routes serving Williamsburg, James City County, and upper York County is operated by Williamsburg Area Transit Authority at Lee Hall.

=== Utilities ===
The Newport News Waterworks was begun as a project of Collis P. Huntington as part of the development of the lower peninsula with the Chesapeake and Ohio Railway, the coal piers on the harbor of Hampton Roads, and massive shipyard which were the major sources of industrial growth which helped found Newport News as a new independent city in 1896. It included initially an impoundment of the Warwick River in western Warwick County. Later expansions included more reservoirs, including one at Skiffe's Creek and another at Walkers Dam on the Chickahominy River.

A regional water provider, in modern times it is owned and operated by the City of Newport News and serves over 400,000 people in the cities of Hampton, Newport News, Poquoson, and portions of York County and James City County.

The city provides wastewater services for residents and transports wastewater to the regional Hampton Roads Sanitation District treatment plants.

=== Police ===
The Law Enforcement in Newport News is being provided by its Newport News Police Department.

== Sister cities ==
Newport News has three sister cities:

- Neyagawa, Osaka, Japan
- Taizhou, Jiangsu, China
- Greifswald, Mecklenburg-Vorpommern, Germany

Newport News is also currently in the process of adding Carrigaline, County Cork Ireland as a Sister City.

== See also ==
- List of people from Hampton Roads
- List of mayors of Newport News, Virginia
- National Register of Historic Places listings in Newport News, Virginia
- Newport News Department of Parks, Recreation and Tourism
- Newport News Sheriff's Office
- Warwick County, Virginia (defunct)
- USS Newport News, 3 ships
