= Ferguson Enterprises =

American plumbing and heating company

Ferguson Enterprises Inc.

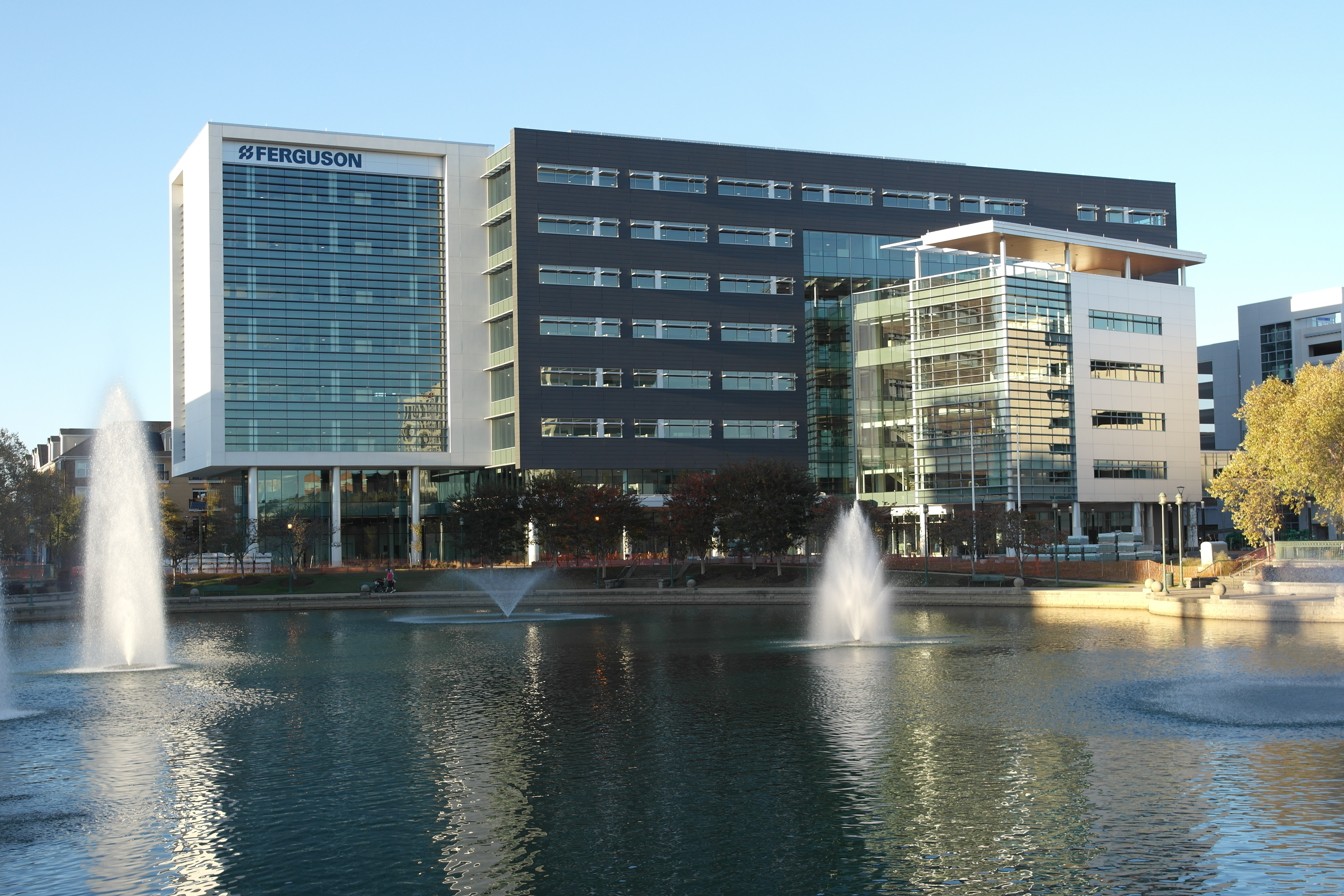
- Ferguson Headquarters 3 in City Center at Oyster Point in Newport News.
- Type: Public
- Traded as: NYSE: FERG; S&P 500 component
- Founded: 1953; 73 years ago in Birmingham, Alabama, U.S.
- Headquarters: Newport News, Virginia, U.S.
- Key people: Kevin Murphy, President & CEO; William Brundage, CFO; Geoffrey Drabble, Chairman
- Products: Plumbing, heating, ventilation and air conditioning (HVAC), appliances, and lighting to pipes, valves and fittings (PVF)
- Revenue: ▲US$30.762 billion (July 31, 2025)
- Operating income: ▼US$2.606 billion (July 31, 2025)
- Net income: ▲US$1.856 billion (July 31, 2025)
- Total assets: ▲US$17.729 billion (July 31, 2025)
- Total equity: ▲US$5.832 billion (July 31, 2025)
- Number of employees: Approximately 35,000 (July 31, 2025), including 32,000 in the United States and 3,000 in Canada
- Website: www.ferguson.com

Ferguson Enterprises Inc., headquartered in Newport News, Virginia and organized in Delaware, is the largest U.S. distributor of plumbing, heating, ventilation and air conditioning (HVAC), appliances, and lighting to pipes, valves and fittings (PVF), and water and wastewater products. The company receives 95% of its revenue in the United States and 5% of its revenue in Canada. The company has 37,000 suppliers and operates from 11 regional distribution centers, four MDCs, approximately 5,900 fleet vehicles, and 1,746 branches.

== History ==
The company was established by Charles Ferguson, Ralph Lenz and Johnny Smither in Newport News, Virginia in 1953.

Ferguson was acquired by a UK based business, Wolseley plc, for $30.7 million in 1982. In 1999, Ferguson merged with Familian Corporation of Los Angeles.

In November 2007, during the Great Recession, the company cut 3,000 jobs in the United States, approximately 5% of its workforce.

Wolseley plc then changed its name to Ferguson plc to reflect the importance of the US side of the business in 2017.

In January 2021, Ferguson sold Wolseley UK to Clayton, Dubilier & Rice for £308 million.

In August 2024, the company reorganized its structure in order to domicile the parent company in the US.

=== US Acquisitions ===
Year	Company	Description	Ref(s).
2010	Build.com domain name	Price was $35 million	
2012	Power Equipment Direct		
December 2014	HP Products		
2015	Living Direct		
March 2019	Kitchen Art	Kitchen and bathroom cabinetry design, installation and remodeling	
May 2019	Mission Pipe	Plumbing distributor	
July 2019	Innovative Soil Solutions and Action Plumbing Supply	Erosion control solutions and geosynthetics throughout Texas and supplier of commercial products and a key industrial PVF distributor in southeast Florida	
September 2019	Process Instruments	Distributor of high-quality process instrumentation, valves and control valves.	
February 2020	Columbia Pipe & Supply	independent distributor headquartered in Chicago, Illinois	
February 2020	S.W. Anderson	HVAC equipment and supplies	
October 2020	Signature Hardware	Price was $210 million. Sellers later sued the company for failing to make earn-out payments.	
August 2022	Monark Premium Appliances	Acquired several locations from Transformco for an undisclosed amount.	
