= Kiln Creek =

- Residential community
- Interactive map of Kiln Creek
- Coordinates: 37°7′15″N 76°28′45″W
- Country: United States
- State: Virginia
- Cities: Newport News and Yorktown

Kiln Creek is a residential community located in Newport News and Yorktown, Virginia. It contains over 2,000 homes in 31 "villages", an elementary school, a golf course, and a recreational center. The community has a board of directors, an architectural review board, and several other committees. The community's motto is "A Great Place To Be".
