= City Center at Oyster Point =

Business district in Newport News, Virginia, US

Coordinates: 37°5′14″N 76°28′22.7″W

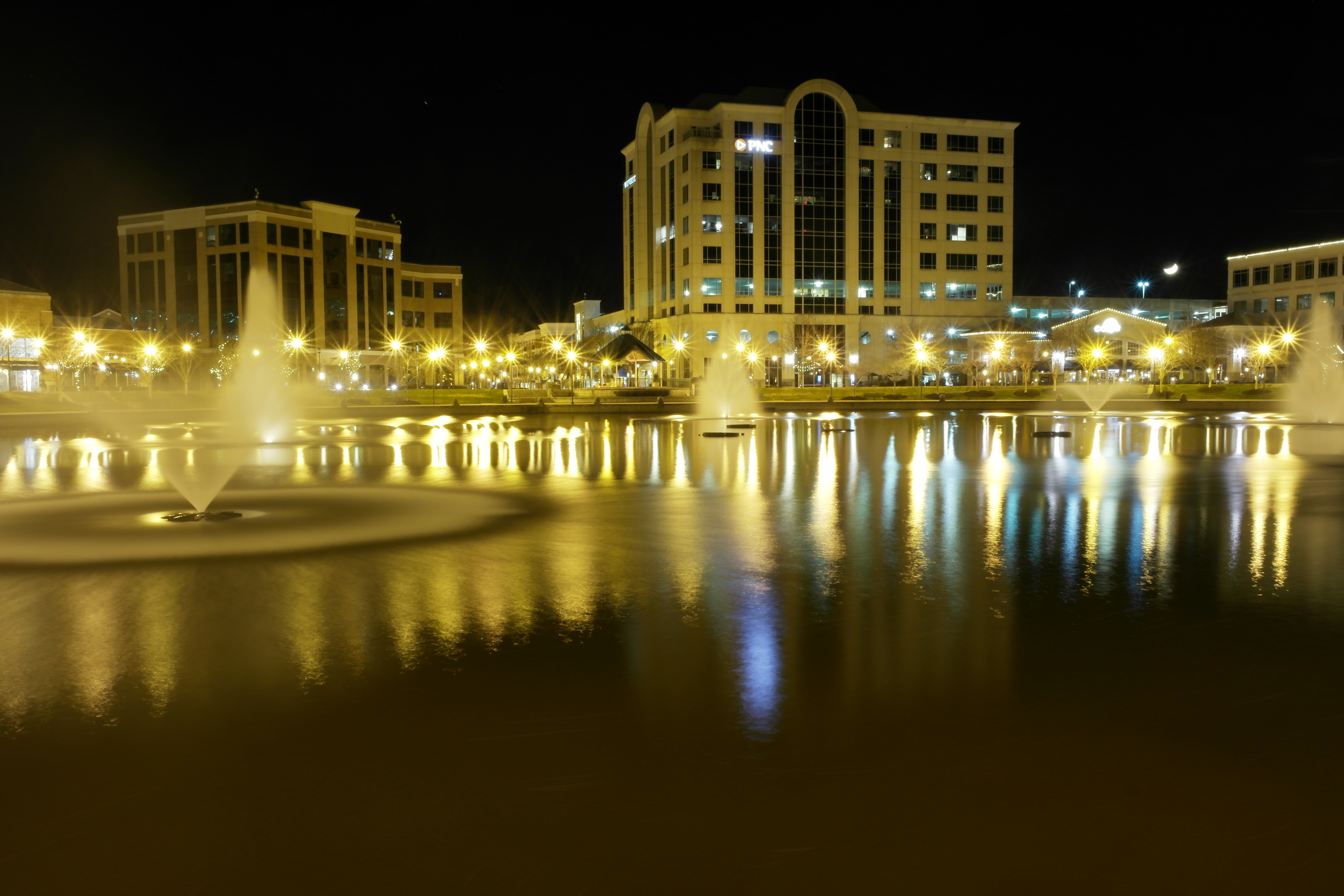
City Center at Oyster Point

City Center at Oyster Point is a business district in the Oyster Point section of Newport News, Virginia. It is a 52-acre (210,000 m^{2}) high density mixed-use development that has 225,000 sq ft (21,000 m^{2}) of retail shops and restaurants and 1,000,000 sq ft (100,000 m^{2}) of Class A office space. It is inspired by the maritime history of the city, landscaped in a southern living style with views to a 5-acre (20,000 m^{2}) fountain.

City Center has been touted as the new "downtown" because of its new geographic centrality on the Virginia Peninsula and its proximity to the retail/business nucleus of the city. In fact, many city offices have relocated there from the downtown area. A mall and many other large shopping areas are located not far from City Center, with easy access to Interstate 64, the Newport News/Williamsburg International Airport, and public transportation.

One of the main aspects is the office space in the development. Corporate headquarters, banking, insurance and legal firms have gathered at City Center for its office space. The mid and high-rise buildings offer a business location surrounded by an 8-acre (32,000 m^{2}) Fountain Park. Also within the office space are the offices of the City of Newport News, which have relocated from the downtown area of the city. The company employees approximately 5,000 people.

Within walking distance from these buildings are shopping and dining facilities centered on the fountain in the center of the development. There are 230,000 sq ft (21,000 m^{2}). of retail space consisting of restaurants, specialty stores, cafes, a gourmet market and Marriott Hotel and Conference Center, an eleven-story hotel and conference facility with 23,000 square feet (2,100 m^{2}) of meeting and banquet space. The Marriott Hotel also features a 12,000-square-foot (1,100 m^{2}) ballroom, 4,400-square-foot (410 m^{2}) junior ballroom and a 6,500-square-foot (600 m^{2}) rotunda with views of the 5-acre (20,000 m^{2}) fountain.

Residential space is also located within City Center. Four 4-story brick buildings are the home to apartments, with first-floor retail space, a clubhouse, outdoor pool, fitness room and business center. The Point at City Center has condominiums with private balconies, conveniences, and parking.

The center was completed and conducted a grand opening in 2009.

== Tenants ==
Daily Press has its headquarters in leased space. The Virginian-Pilot moved into the same facility in 2020.
