= Amos Bradley =

- Born: 1837; Dansville, New York
- Died: June 9, 1894 (aged 56–57); Spokane, Washington
- Burial place: Greenwood Memorial Terrace, Spokane, Washington
- Military career
- Allegiance: United States
- Branch: United States Navy
- Rank: Landsman
- Unit: USS Varuna
- Conflicts: American Civil War: Battle of Forts Jackson and St. Philip
- Awards: Medal of Honor

Amos Bradley (1837 – June 9, 1894) was a Union Navy sailor in the American Civil War and a recipient of the U.S. military's highest decoration, the Medal of Honor, for his actions at the Battle of Forts Jackson and St. Philip.

== Biography ==
Born in 1837 in Dansville, New York, Bradley was still living in that state when he joined the Navy. He served during the Civil War as a landsman on the USS Varuna. At the Battle of Forts Jackson and St. Philip near New Orleans on April 24, 1862, Varuna was rammed twice by the Confederate steamer CSS Governor Moore (formerly known as the Charles Morgan) and eventually sunk. Bradley was stationed at the ship's wheel and showed "the greatest courage" throughout the close-range fight. For this action, he was awarded the Medal of Honor a year later, on April 3, 1863.

Bradley's official Medal of Honor citation reads:

Served on board the U.S.S. Varuna in one of the most responsible positions, during the attacks on Forts Jackson and St. Philip, and while in action against the rebel ship Morgan, 24 April 1862. Although guns were raking the decks from behind him, Bradley remained steadfast at the wheel throughout the thickest of the fight, continuing at his station and rendering service with the greatest courage until his ship, repeatedly holed and twice rammed by the rebel ship Morgan, was beached and sunk.

In 1883, Bradley moved to Spokane, Washington. He died at his home in the Ross Park neighborhood on June 9, 1894, at age 56 or 57 and was buried at Spokane's Greenwood Memorial Terrace. His grave was unmarked until 2009, when his status as a Medal of Honor recipient was discovered and a military headstone was installed.

== See also ==
- List of American Civil War Medal of Honor recipients: A-F
