= Homer Ferguson =

Homer Ferguson may refer to:

- Homer S. Ferguson (1889–1982), United States Senator from Michigan
- Homer L. Ferguson (1873–1953), American author and businessman
