= Mount Pleasant Cemetery (Taunton, Massachusetts) =

Historic cemetery in Massachusetts, United States

- U.S. National Register of Historic Places
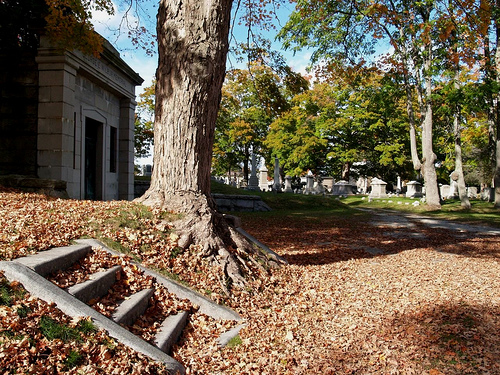

- Location within Massachusetts Location within the United States
- Location: Taunton, Massachusetts
- Coordinates: 41°53′42″N 71°5′59″W
- Area: 10.1 acres (4.1 ha)
- Built: 1710
- Architect: Wilbar, Joseph
- NRHP reference No.: 02001474
- Added to NRHP: December 5, 2002

Mount Pleasant Cemetery is a historic cemetery at Crocker, Cohannet, and Barnum Streets in Taunton, Massachusetts. Opened in 1836, but based on a family burial ground dating to the early 18th century, it is the fourth garden cemetery in the U.S. rural cemeteries, based on the early Victorian model of Mount Auburn Cemetery in Cambridge, Massachusetts. The cemetery was listed on the National Register of Historic Places in 2002.

== History ==
Mount Pleasant Cemetery was established in the grounds of the King family homestead, which included burials dating to 1710; these graves are still located in the cemetery. The cemetery was designed by Easton native Joseph Wilbar, who had moved to Taunton in 1822; it appears to be the only known landscape work he has executed. The cemetery occupies about 10 acres (4.0 ha) in a diamond-shaped lot bordered on three sides by Crocker, Cohannet and Barnum Streets, with its main gate on Crocker Street, a wrought iron gate supported by granite posts donated by Mrs. Edward King in 1926.

Mount Pleasant Cemetery was officially established on July 4, 1836, as the third "garden style" cemetery in the country. The Mount Auburn Cemetery in Cambridge, Massachusetts, was the first.

There are soldiers buried in this cemetery from the King William's War, Queen Anne's War, American Revolutionary War, War of 1812, Mexican War, American Civil War, Spanish–American War, World War I, World War II and the Korean War. The highest ranking army officer in this cemetery is Civil War General Darius Nash Couch and the highest ranking Naval officer is Rear Admiral Albert Loring Swasey. There are Congressmen, state legislators, mayors as well as national pioneers in the fields of industry, business, the arts and transportation.

== Notable burials ==
- Darius N. Couch
- Samuel L. Crocker
- Henry Vincent Hubbard
- William Mason
- Marcus Morton (1784–1864)
- Marcus Morton (1819–1891)
- Charles Swasey

== See also ==
- National Register of Historic Places listings in Taunton, Massachusetts
