= Hilton Pier/Ravine =

Park in Virginia

Coordinates: 37.027°N 76.465°W

The Hilton Pier/Ravine (often simply Hilton Pier) is a park located in the Hilton Village historic district in Newport News, Virginia. It is maintained by the Newport News Department of Parks, Recreation and Tourism.

== Location ==
The Hilton Pier is located behind Hilton Elementary School on the James River. The Ravine portion of the park is located on the northwest side of Hilton Elementary School and comprises a small wooded ravine and some footpaths.

== History ==
The Hilton Pier was first built in 1918 as part of the development of Hilton Village. The pier was a favorite spot for local recreational fishing for decades and has been rebuilt a number of times due to storm damage and weathering. Most recently, on September 18, 2003, the pier was destroyed by the high winds and surging tides of Hurricane Isabel. Plans to rebuild the pier started almost immediately, but were met with controversy when it was revealed that a prominent member of the state legislature wanted the new pier moved several hundred feet from its previous location because it was near his house. The pier ended up being located about 40 feet away from the location of the original pier. It was reopened in May 2005, and on July 9 was formally rededicated by Joe Frank, the mayor of Newport News.

== Offerings ==
There is a small beach at the location of the park. The fishing is described as excellent at the pier. Croaker and trout are the fish primarily caught during the summer months. The pier is accessible to visitors in wheelchairs, a feature the earlier piers lacked. It is approximately 410 feet in length.
