= 1865 Massachusetts gubernatorial election =

- November 7, 1865
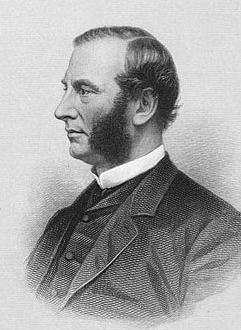

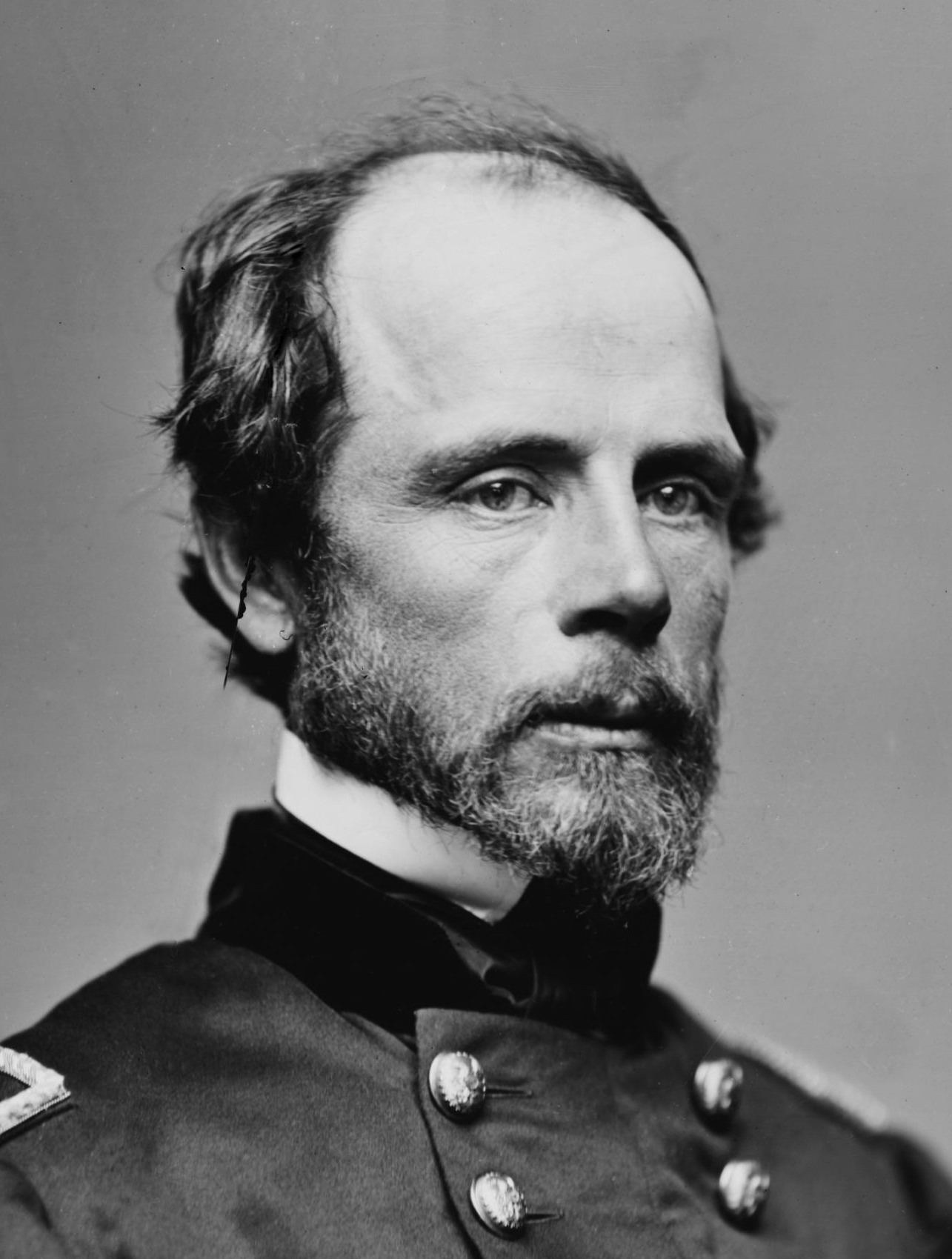
Nominee	Alexander Bullock	Darius Couch
Party	Republican	Democratic
Popular vote	69,912	21,245
Percentage	76.56%	23.27%
- County results Bullock: 50–60% 60–70% 70–80% 80–90% >90%
Governor before election
John Albion Andrew
Republican
Elected Governor
Alexander Bullock
Republican

The 1865 Massachusetts gubernatorial election was held on November 7.

Governor John Albion Andrew did not run for a sixth term in office. Republican Alexander Bullock was elected to succeed him, defeating Democrat Darius Couch.

== Republican nomination ==
At the Worcester convention on September 14, Alexander Bullock was nominated unanimously.

== General election ==
=== Candidates ===
- Alexander Bullock, speaker of the Massachusetts House of Representative and former mayor of Worcester (Republican)
- Darius Couch, major general of the Union Army (Democratic)

=== Results ===
1865 Massachusetts gubernatorial election
Party	Candidate	Votes	%	±%
Republican	Alexander Bullock	69,912	76.56%	▲4.90
Democratic	Darius Couch	21,245	23.27%	▼5.04
Write-in		161	0.18%	▲0.14
Total votes		91,318	100.00%	
Republican hold		Swing		

== See also ==
- 1865 Massachusetts legislature
