= USS Swasey (DD-273) =

Clemson-class destroyer

Coordinates: 56°29′N 0°57′W

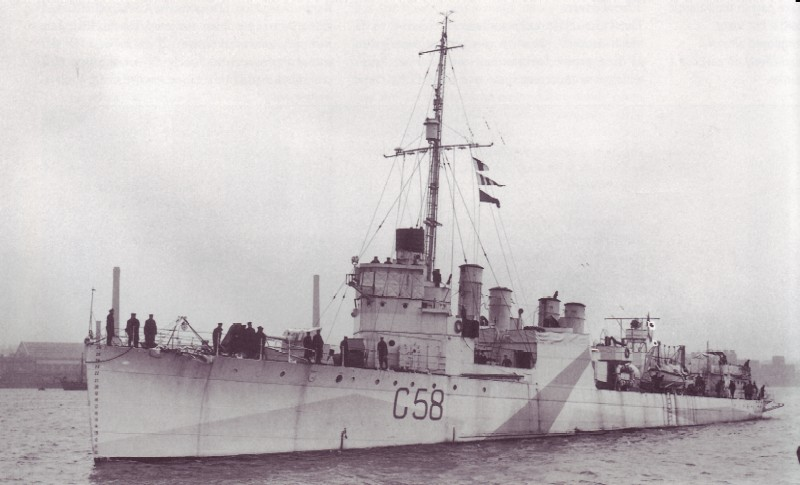
- HMS Rockingham

History

United States
- Name: USS Swasey
- Namesake: Charles Swasey
- Builder: Bethlehem Shipbuilding Corporation, Squantum Victory Yard
- Laid down: 27 August 1918
- Launched: 7 May 1919
- Sponsored by: Ms. Mary L. Swasey
- Commissioned: 8 August 1919
- Decommissioned: 10 June 1922
- Stricken: 8 January 1941
- Fate: Transferred to the United Kingdom, 26 November 1940

United Kingdom
- Name: HMS Rockingham
- Acquired: 26 November 1940
- Fate: Sank while under tow after striking a mine on 27 September 1944

General characteristics
- Class & type: Clemson-class destroyer
- Displacement: 1,215 long tons (1,234 t)
- Length: 314 ft 4 in (95.81 m)
- Beam: 31 ft 8 in (9.65 m)
- Draft: 9 ft 10 in (3.00 m)
- Installed power: 26,500 hp (19,800 kW)
- Propulsion: 2 × geared turbines; 2 × shafts
- Speed: 35 kn (40 mph; 65 km/h)
- Range: 4,900 nmi (5,600 mi; 9,100 km) at 15 kn (17 mph; 28 km/h)
- Complement: 130 officers and enlisted
- Armament: 4 × 4 in (102 mm)/50 cal guns, 1 × 3 in (76 mm) gun, 12 × 21 inch (533 mm) torpedo tubes

The first USS Swasey (DD-273) was a Clemson-class destroyer in the United States Navy and transferred to the Royal Navy as HMS Rockingham (G58).

== Service history ==
=== USS Swasey ===
Named for Charles Swasey, Swasey was laid down on 27 August 1918 by the Bethlehem Shipbuilding Corporation, Squantum, Massachusetts; launched on 7 May 1919; sponsored by Ms. Mary L. Swasey; and commissioned on 8 August 1919.

Swasey was assigned to the Pacific Fleet and, after completing fitting out and sailing to the west coast, arrived at Pearl Harbor in the fall of 1919. She served there until the summer of 1922, when she returned to San Diego, California.

Swasey was decommissioned at San Diego on 10 June 1922 and assigned to the reserve fleet for the next 17 years. Swasey was reactivated on 18 December 1939 and – after an overhaul and sea trials – transferred to Britain on 26 November 1940 under the Destroyers for Bases Agreement.

Swasey was struck from the Naval Vessel Register on 8 January 1941.

=== HMS Rockingham ===
Rockingham was modified for trade convoy escort service by removal of three of the original 4 in (102 mm)/50 cals and three of the triple torpedo tube mounts to reduce topside weight for additional depth charge stowage and installation of hedgehog. Rockingham was assigned to Escort Group B-1 of the Mid-Ocean Escort Force for convoys ON 96, SC 105, SC 119, ON 171, HX 230 and HX 236 during the winter of 1942–43.

Rockingham sank on 27 September 1944 while under tow after striking a mine.
