= Theodora Kimball Hubbard =

American librarian

Originally published in the Spanish language periodical, Revista Municipal y de Intereses Economicos in 1921. Her portrait in this article is captioned: "Bibliotecaria de la Universidad de Harvard. Notable escritora de asuntos municipales," which translates as Librarian at Harvard University, and noted writer on the subject of city planning.

Theodora Kimball Hubbard (1887–1935) was the first librarian of the Harvard School of Landscape Architecture, and a contemporary of and collaborator with many significant figures in landscape architecture in expanding the body of knowledge in that subject area.

== Early life and education ==
Hubbard was born on February 26, 1887, in West Newton, Massachusetts, Hubbard was the older sister of the noted architectural historian Sidney Fiske Kimball. She graduated from the Girls’ Latin School in Boston in 1904 and entered Simmons College later that year, graduating in 1908. In 1917, she received a master’s degree in Library Science from Simmons College, with a minor and thesis in English landscape gardening.

== Career ==
=== Early career ===
Hubbard worked briefly as an editorial writer for The New England Historical and Genealogical Register, where she compiled a subject index to its first sixty volumes. In 1910 she worked for a year as an assistant in the Boston Public Library’s Art Department. Following her master's degree, she headed the library of the U.S. Bureau of Industrial Housing and Transportation in Washington, D.C. for two years. By the 1920s she was teaching at both the Cambridge School of Architecture and Landscape Architecture and in the Landscape Architecture Department at Harvard Graduate School of Design, where she taught English.

=== Later career ===
Theodora Kimball Hubbard worked as the Librarian of the School Landscape Architecture at Harvard from 1911 to 1924. She was the first Landscape Architecture Librarian at Harvard University, creating a "new" library by consolidating collections, held in disparate locations, in Harvard’s Robinson Hall in October 1911. Hubbard's relationship with her brother propelled her into her ultimate career classifying the literature of landscape architecture and city planning. Sidney "Fiske" Kimball, who was enrolled in the School of Architecture at Harvard, was awarded a Sheldon Fellowship for travel to Europe in 1911 and passed his assistantship in the library to Kimball Hubbard during his absence. Prior to this role, Kimball Hubbard had already been immersed in writing on the growing profession of landscape architecture, and Charles Eliot greatly influenced Kimball’s understanding of the profession. In addition to cataloguing, Hubbard was involved in research for James Sturgis Pray, Chairman of the Landscape Architecture Department at Harvard University. By helping them with their research, Kimball received an education in landscape architecture.

In her role as librarian, she brought a keen sense of professionalism to her work, and until 1918 when she hired her assistant Katherine McNamara, appears to have been the only Harvard design librarian with professional library training. Kimball cultivated the library into a specialized institution, developing it as “a clearing-house” of information and fielding research and information requests from practitioners around the world. Kimball also pioneered organizational and housing systems for visual and graphic media such as lantern slides, photographs, plans, maps, and postcards. The techniques employed at Harvard Graduate School of Design library were based on those used in private offices, particularly the Olmsted firm. During her tenure as librarian, she more than doubled the number of books and pamphlets in the Harvard collection.

In 1918 Hubbard became an associate member of the American Society of Landscape Architects. In 1919, Hubbard became the first woman accepted as a member to the American City Planning Institute. That same year she developed the first Library of Congress Classification for landscape architecture under the subclass (NAB). She developed a separate classification scheme for city planning under the subclass (NAC). She was assisted in this endeavor by her husband Henry Vincent Hubbard (1875–1945), a Harvard professor, and the founding editor of Landscape Architecture Magazine. Renowned landscape architect, Frederick Law Olmsted, the designer of a network of parks known as the "Emerald Necklace" in Boston, Central Park in New York, and idyllic greenspaces across the United States is given special acknowledgment in the preface of the published classification scheme, for having contributed many constructive suggestions. The Library of Congress originally assigned a place for landscape architecture as a sub-classification to architecture (NA) by the addition of the letter (B). The authors thought that this placement most precisely acknowledged the artistic component of landscape architecture, whereas placing it in subclass (S), as it is today, would suggest that it is simply another form of agriculture. Books acquired in this subject area since 1978 are now classed in (SB).

She left Harvard in 1924, the year she married Henry Vincent Hubbard, but continued to serve the library in an advisory capacity. She served on President Herbert Hoover's advisory Committee on Zoning in Washington, D.C., as an expert on zoning, and also a member of the research committee for the President's Conference on Home Building and Home Ownership.

=== Writings ===
One of her most important works: "Municipal Accomplishment in City Planning" a bibliography of all of the works on urbanism in the United States was published in Europe and the United States to great acclaim. She is credited with writing over 100 editorials, articles, and reviews in addition to preparing detailed bibliographies and reports on the fields of landscape and city planning. She collaborated with her husband on a basic textbook for landscape architecture, An Introduction to the Study of Landscape Design, which for many years was considered the standard text. Through her work she achieved international recognition. As a librarian and writer she made great contributions to the advancement of the profession of landscape design by organizing the information, critiquing the work, and contributing to the literature, giving the field more substance, status and visibility in academic circles. In addition to published books, Hubbard contributed to such journals as Landscape Architecture (beginning in 1912), House Beautiful, and The Garden Magazine.

Frederick Law Olmsted, Jr., commissioned her to edit his father’s papers for publication in 1920, resulting in Frederick Law Olmsted, landscape architect, 1822–1903. Olmsted and Hubbard worked adjacently at Harvard Graduate School of Design.

=== Legacy ===
Kimball’s library work contributed to landscape architecture education at many schools. She participated for years in the National Landscape Architectural Education Conference, serving on the Subcommittee on English. She also chaired the Committee on Libraries and Collections, given her influence on educational programs through her widely published and regularly updated bibliographies of landscape architecture and city planning publications. The bibliographies she published (often called check-lists and ready reference lists) were used by other universities as a basis for library acquisitions, thus forming part of the foundation upon which other educational programs were built.

Hubbard died in November 1935 at the age of 48 in Milton, Massachusetts. In a Landscape Architecture obituary, the Boston Chapter of the ASLA lauded her for service to the profession but declined to cite specifics, noting that there was “In these few pages no place for a detailed account . . . [of her] many activities in the fields of landscape architecture and city planning”.

== Selected bibliography ==
- Hubbard, Henry Vincent; Hubbard, Theodora Kimball (1917). An introduction to the study of landscape design. New York: The Macmillan Company.
- Pray, James Sturgis; Hubbard, Theodora Kimball (1913). City planning; a comprehensive analysis of the subject arranged for the classification of books, plans, photographs, notes and other collected material, with alphabetic subject index. Cambridge: Harvard University Press.
- Hubbard, Henry Vincent; Hubbard, Theodora Kimball (1920). Landscape architecture; a comprehensive classification scheme for books, plans, photographs, notes and other collected material, with combined alphabetic topic index and list of subject headings. Cambridge: Harvard University Press.
- Hubbard, Theodora Kimball (1920). Municipal accomplishment in city planning and published city plan reports in the United States. Boston: National Conference on City Planning.
- Hubbard, T. Kimball. Bibliography on streets: their arrangement, lighting and planting.
- Hubbard, T., & McNamara, K. (1936). Bibliography of planning, 1928-1935 : A supplement to manual of planning information, 1928 (Harvard city planning studies; 10). Cambridge: Harvard University Press.
- Pray, J. Sturgis., Hubbard, T. Kimball. (1913). A city-planning classification. Cambridge, Mass.: Harvard university press.
- Hubbard, T., & Hubbard, Henry Vincent. (1929). It pays to plan.
- Olmsted, F. Law., Hubbard, T. Kimball., Olmsted, F. Law. (1922). Frederick Law Olmsted, landscape architect, 1822-1903. New York: G.P. Putnam's Sons.
- Hubbard, T. Kimball., McNamara, K. (1923). Manual of information on city planning and zoning: including references on regional, rural, and national planning. Cambridge: Harvard university press.
- Hubbard, T. Kimball., Detroit (Mich.). City Plan Commission., National Conference on City Planning. (1920). Municipal accomplishment in city planning and published city plan reports in the United States. Boston, Mass.
- Hubbard, T. Kimball., Hubbard, H. Vincent., Harvard University. Milton fund for research. (1929). Our cities, to-day and to-morrow: a survey of planning and zoning progress in the United States. Cambridge: Harvard University Press.
- United States Housing Corporation., Hubbard, T. Kimball. (1919). Selected bibliography of industrial housing in America and Great Britain during and after the war. Washington: Govt. print. off.
- Hubbard, T. Kimball. A brief survey of recent city-planning reports in the United States.
- Hubbard, Theodora Kimball, et al. (1922) Transactions of the American Society of Landscape Architects, 1909-1921.Amsterdam, N.Y., The Recorder press.

== Additional Sources ==
Donnelly, J., & Hubbard, T. (1936). Theodora Kimball Hubbard, 1887-1935.

Brooks, Evelyn, & Brooks, Lee. (1933). A Decade of Planning Literature. Social Forces, 12(1), 427.
