= Hilton Village =

- U.S. National Register of Historic Places
- U.S. Historic district
- Virginia Landmarks Register
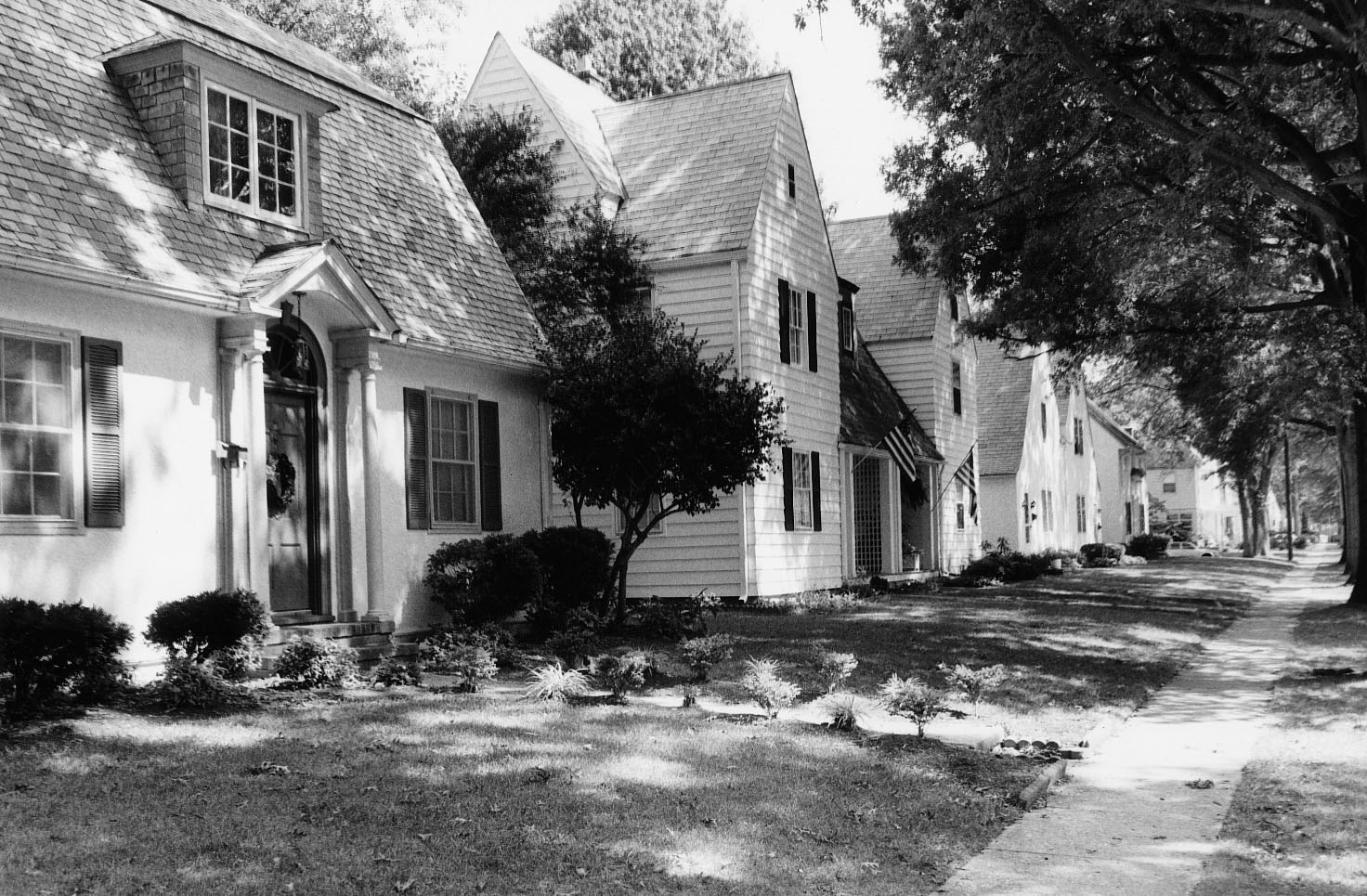

- Location within Virginia
- Location: Bounded by the James River, Post St., Chesapeake and Ohio RR tracks, and Hopkins St., Newport News, Virginia
- Coordinates: 37°01′46″N 76°27′39″W
- Area: 100 acres (40 ha)
- Built: 1917-1921
- Architect: Henry Vincent Hubbard, Joseph D. Leland, III, Francis H. Bulot, and Francis Y. Joannes
- Architectural style: Jacobethan, Dutch Colonial and Colonial Revival
- NRHP reference No.: 69000341
- VLR No.: 121-0009

Significant dates
- Added to NRHP: June 23, 1969
- Designated VLR: November 5, 1968

Hilton Village is a planned English-village-style neighborhood in Newport News, Virginia. Recognized as a pioneering development in urban planning, it is listed on the National Register of Historic Places. The neighborhood was built between 1918 and 1921 in response to the need for housing during World War I for employees of Newport News Shipbuilding & Drydock Company. It is recognized as the United States' first federal war-housing project.

== History ==
=== Founding ===
The planned community was jointly sponsored by the U.S. Shipping Board and the Newport News Shipbuilding and Drydock Company. It was built on the site of J. Pembroke Jones' farm "Hilton."

Hilton Village was opened July 7, 1918. The street names in the 100-acre (0.4 km^{2}) tract of former pine woods honor government and shipyard officials. The 473 English-village-type houses were sold to private owners after the war.

=== Impetus for creation ===
In 1917, during World War I, the war effort was in full swing. Newport News Shipbuilding had many contracts to build naval ships and was hiring thousands of employees. Shipyard workers were being housed in overcrowded and/or temporary quarters. The emerging community of Newport News faced a severe housing shortage. This led to the construction of Hilton Village. The housing shortage was so severe that Newport News Shipbuilding president Homer L. Ferguson traveled to Washington to emphasize to Congress the impact of lack of housing on ship construction and thus the war effort. Immediately after his appearance, the United States Shipping Board was provided funding of $1.2 million and authorization to create a comprehensive emergency housing program. Hilton Village was the first project of the emergency housing program.

=== Planning ===
About three miles (5 km) north of the Newport News city limits, in Warwick County, Virginia, land known locally as the "Darling Tract" was purchased. This consisted of about 200 acres (0.8 km^{2}) of woodlands and, located on a bluff overlooking the James River, the pre-Civil War homestead was named "Hilton". The planning for Hilton Village was conducted using a team approach, highly innovative for the time. Initially. landscape architect Henry Vincent Hubbard was hired as town planner, Joseph D. Leland, III as architect and Francis H. Bulot as sanitary engineer. Leland was unable to finish the assignment because of other obligations, and Francis Y. Joannes was hired as the architect to work on the project. The planners met with the wives of shipyard workers. Based on their input, 14 house plans were designed for the projected 500 English-village-style homes.

Hilton Village, 1920

The location of the neighborhood was several miles away from the urbanized areas of Newport News. Trolley car tracks were run from the city to Hilton Village to allow workers to commute to work at Newport News Shipbuilding and residents access to city services and shopping. The village-style neighborhood was planned so as to offer many services locally. Plots for four churches, a library, a fire house, commercial spaces, and a school, Hilton Elementary School, were provided for in the plan. The houses and services were grouped together in close proximity to allow for easy walking distances. For recreational purposes, the Hilton Pier and ravine, containing a small park, beach and fishing pier, on the banks of the James River were included in the plan directly behind Hilton Elementary.

=== Architecture ===
Hilton was modeled after an early-English village, a decision which was probably influenced by the British Garden city movement in vogue at the time. The major architectural themes of the houses where Jacobethan, Dutch Colonial Revival, Tudor Revival, and Colonial Revival. The houses range from one-and-a-half to two-and-a-half stories, with fourteen major variations of house style. The house types were scattered at random throughout the neighborhood so that there is no tract house feeling to the neighborhood. Further variations on the fourteen styles was achieved by sheathing variously in stucco, shingles, or clapboards. All of the houses are wood-frame construction with steeply pitched slate roofs. Roofing styles are varied as well and include gambrel, hipped, clipped gambrel, gable, and clipped gable.

=== Construction ===
Clearing the wooded site began on April 18, 1918. By the time of the Armistice in November 1918, almost 200 homes had either been completed or were substantially complete and more than a dozen families lived in Hilton Village. Hilton's formal dedication was held on July 7, 1918. The Hilton Elementary School was completed in 1919. Scaled back to 473 homes after the end of World War I, all the homes had been completed and were occupied by the end of 1920.

=== Costs ===
The cost estimate for site development and building each house was $3,200.

=== Post-War to Present ===
In 1921, Hilton Village was purchased from the United States Shipping Board by Henry E. Huntington, chairman of the board at Newport News Shipbuilding. He formed the Newport News Land Company, which ran Hilton as an adjunct of the company. In 1922, many of the houses were put up for private sale, and Hilton Village gradually became a community of homeowners.

=== Streets named after shipyard and government officials ===
Of the currently laid-out streets in Hilton Village, Hopkins Street, Ferguson Avenue and Post Street are named after three of the earlier past Newport News Shipbuilding and Drydock Company Presidents:

- Walter A. Post – Mar. 9, 1911, to Feb. 12, 1912, earlier, a builder of the C&O Railway's terminals and first mayor of Newport News
- Albert L. Hopkins – Mar. 14, 1914, to May 7, 1915, the young New Yorker who was traveling to England on the RMS Lusitania on shipyard business when he died after the ship was torpedoed and sunk by a German U-boat
- Homer L. Ferguson – Jul. 22, 1915, to Jul. 31, 1946, a manager when Hopkins died, Ferguson, who assumed the presidency when Hopkins was killed, saw the company through both world wars, became a noted community leader, and was a co-founder of the Mariners' Museum with Archer M. Huntington, stepson of shipyard founder Collis P. Huntington.

=== Listing on National Register of Historic Places ===
To build the new village, the U.S. Shipping Board hired one of the finest urban planners of the era, Henry Vincent Hubbard of Harvard University. Recognized as a pioneering development in the area of urban planning, Hilton Village was listed on the National Register of Historic Places in 1969.

=== Historic Marker ===
The text of the historical marker that appears on Warwick Boulevard in Hilton Village reads as follows:

The nation's first Federal War Housing project, this planned community was sponsored by the U. S. Shipping Board and the Newport News Shipyard on the site of J. Pembroke Jones' Warwick County farm "Hilton". It was opened July 7, 1918, and sold to private owners after World War I. Street names in the 100-acre (0.40 km^{2}) tract of former pine woods containing 500 English village-type houses honor government and shipyard officials.

== Notable residents ==
- William Styron, noted author
- J. J. Lankes, illustrator, woodcut artist and college professor
- Gary Hudson, actor
