= Charles Swasey =

United States Navy officer

Lieutenant Charles H. Swasey
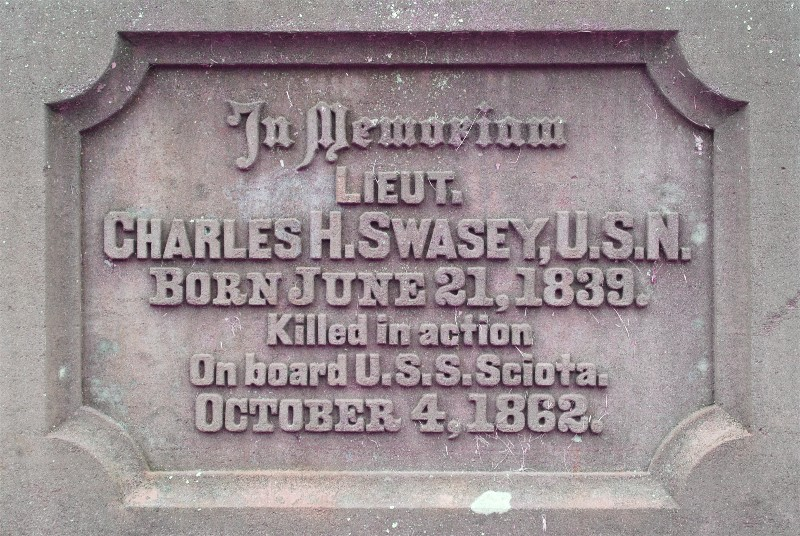
- Inscription on the gravestone of Lt. Charles Swasey at Mount Pleasant Cemetery, Taunton, Massachusetts
- Born: June 21, 1839; Massachusetts
- Died: October 4, 1862 (aged 23); Donaldsonville, Louisiana
- Burial place: Mount Pleasant Cemetery (Taunton, Massachusetts)
- Military career
- Allegiance: United States of America
- Branch: United States Navy
- Service years: 1854–1862
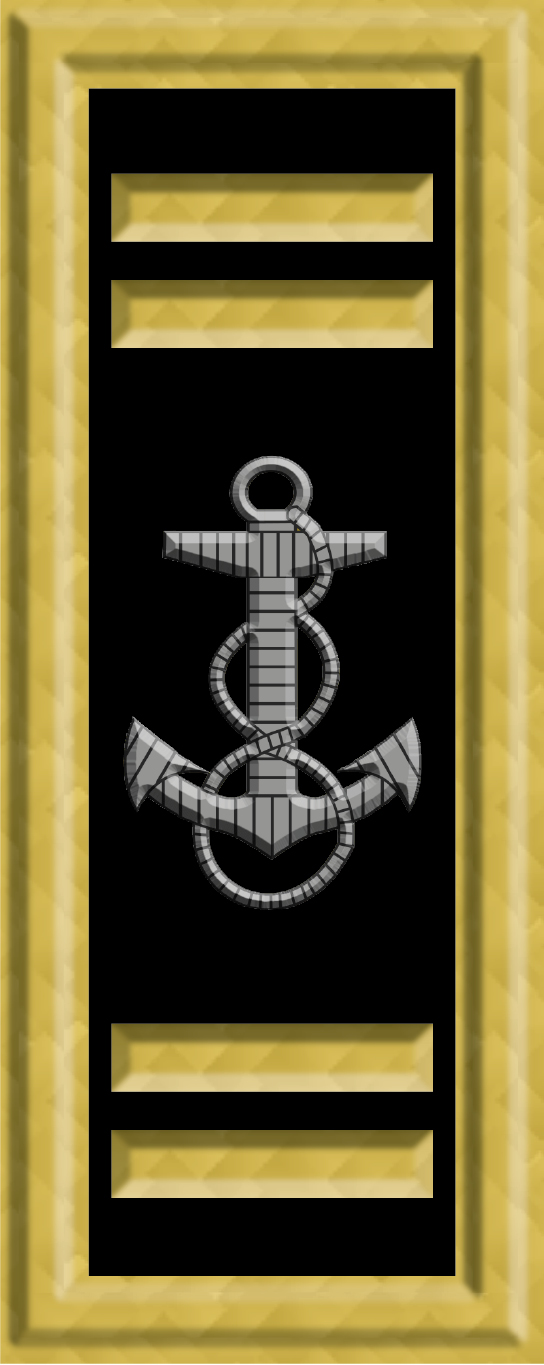
- Rank: Lieutenant
- Conflicts: American Civil War

Charles H. Swasey (June 21, 1839 – October 4, 1862) was an officer in the United States Navy who was killed in action during the American Civil War.

== Biography ==
Born in Massachusetts, Swasey was appointed midshipman on 28 September 1854, and commissioned lieutenant on 31 August 1861. Swasey served aboard Varuna in the engagement with the steamer CSS Governor Moore below New Orleans, Louisiana, on 24 April 1862. He then served as executive officer of Sciota on the West Gulf Blockading Squadron. Lieutenant Swasey was wounded during an engagement with Confederate forces near Donaldsonville, Louisiana, on 4 October 1862, and died the same day.

He is buried at Mount Pleasant Cemetery in Taunton, Massachusetts.

== Namesakes ==
Two ships have been named USS Swasey in his honor.

== See also ==
- Mount Pleasant Cemetery (Taunton, Massachusetts)
