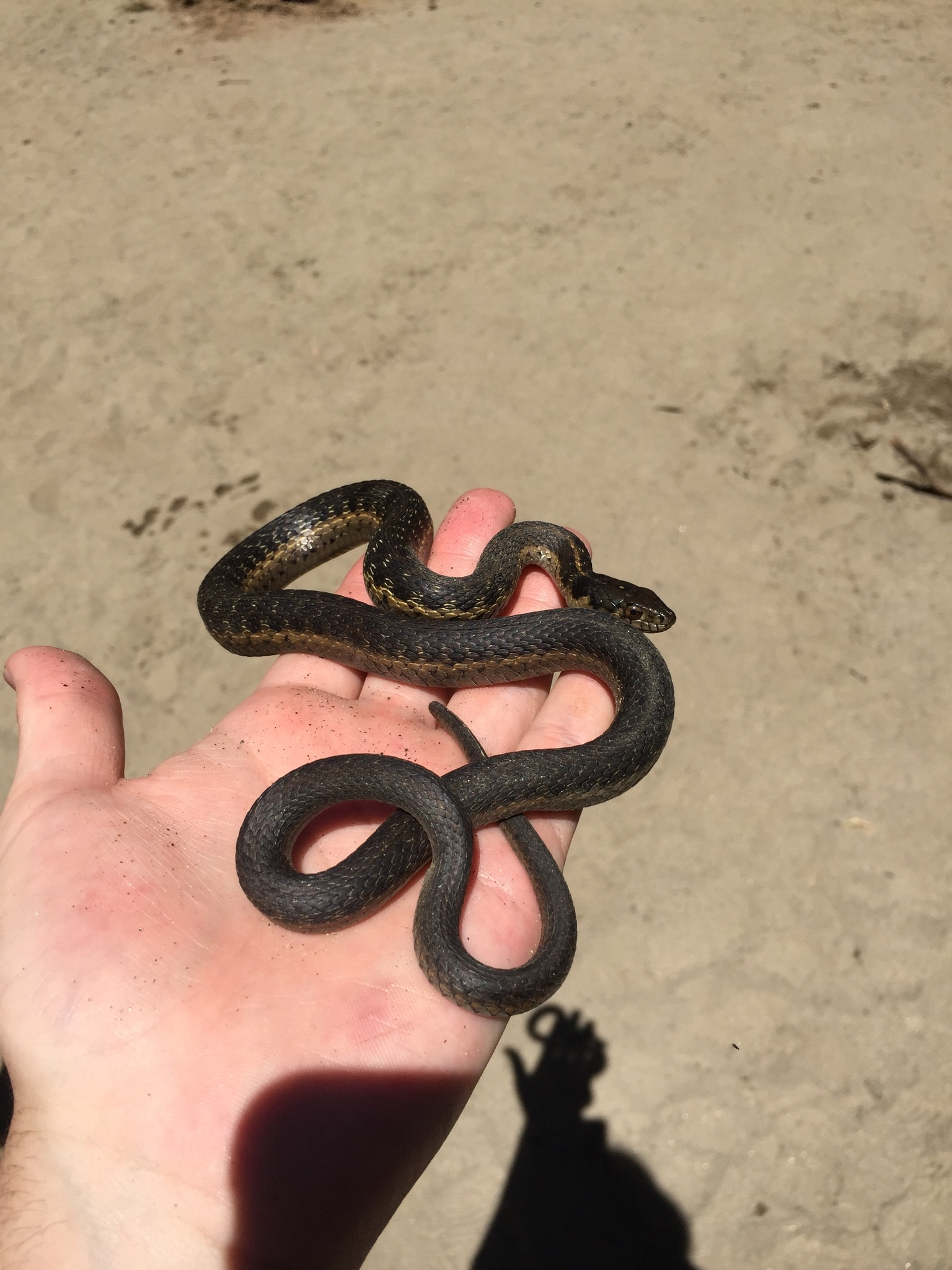
- On the banks of the Middle Tuolumne River in the Sierra Nevada.

Conservation status
- Least Concern (IUCN 3.1)

Scientific classification
- Kingdom: Animalia
- Phylum: Chordata
- Class: Reptilia
- Order: Squamata
- Suborder: Serpentes
- Family: Colubridae
- Genus: Thamnophis
- Species: T. couchii

Binomial name
- Thamnophis couchii (Kennicott, 1859)
- Thamnophis couchii range map, from the California Department of Fish and Wildlife

Synonyms
- Eutaenia couchii Kennicott, 1859; Thamnophis ordinoides couchii — Van Denburgh & Slevin, 1921; Thamnophis couchii — Fitch, 1984

= Sierra garter snake =

Species of snake in the family Colubridae

Thamnophis couchii, commonly known as Couch's garter snake, the Sierra garter snake, or the western aquatic garter snake, is a highly aquatic species of snake in the family Colubridae. The species is endemic to the western United States, specifically the Sierra Nevada mountain range.

== Etymology ==
The specific name couchii is in honor of Darius Nash Couch, a U.S. Army officer and naturalist who collected specimens during the Mexican-American War and subsequent expeditions.

== Description ==
The Sierra garter snake is a medium-sized, slender snake adapted for an aquatic lifestyle. They possess a somewhat pointed head, which aids in underwater foraging in fast-flowing currents. Like many garter snakes, they have a mild venom produced in the Duvernoy's gland that is harmless to humans but effective at subduing small, cold-blooded prey. Furthermore, because their diet frequently includes highly toxic newts, the snakes can sequester the tetrodotoxin in their own tissues, making them poisonous to potential predators like birds and mammals.

== Geographic range and habitat ==
T. couchii is native to California with a small population in west-central Nevada and the Owens Valley. It is predominantly found in the Sierra Nevada mountains, ranging from the Pit and Sacramento rivers south to the Tehachapi Mountains.

The preferred natural habitats of T. couchii are freshwater wetlands, clear rapid-flowing rivers, creeks, mountain ponds, and small lakes. They occur at elevations ranging from roughly 300 to 8,000 ft (91 to 2,438 m) in diverse environments including montane coniferous forests, oak woodlands, chaparral, and sagebrush. They are almost always found in close proximity to water, often utilizing rocks and riparian vegetation for cover and basking.

== Behavior and ecology ==
T. couchii is highly aquatic and diurnal. It spends much of its time in the water or basking on rocks and vegetation at the water's edge. They are capable of crawling on stream bottoms and hunt actively underwater, relying heavily on their eyesight.

When threatened, the Sierra garter snake will often attempt to flee into the water. If captured or cornered, it defends itself by striking repeatedly and releasing a foul-smelling musk and cloacal contents. During winter months, especially at higher elevations in the Sierra Nevada, the snakes undergo brumation (hibernation) in communal dens for several months.

=== Diet ===
The diet of the Sierra garter snake consists almost entirely of aquatic prey, primarily fish and amphibians, including frogs, tadpoles, and aquatic salamander larvae. They are notable for their ability to safely consume highly toxic Pacific newts (genus Taricha), such as the California newt (Taricha torosa), having evolved a genetic resistance to their deadly tetrodotoxin.

There is a distinct ontogenetic shift in their feeding habits: adult snakes tend to forage in deeper, faster-moving water for larger prey like Pacific giant salamander larvae, while neonates and juveniles hunt smaller prey along the shallow stream margins.

== Reproduction ==
T. couchii is ovoviviparous (giving birth to live young). Mating typically occurs in the spring shortly after the snakes emerge from brumation. Females carry the developing embryos throughout the summer and give birth to live neonates in late summer or early fall. The newborns are fully independent immediately after birth.
