= USS Swasey =

USS Swasey may refer to the following ships of the United States Navy:

- USS Swasey (DD-273), a Clemson-class destroyer commissioned in 1919; transferred to the Royal Navy as HMS Rockingham, 1940
- USS Swasey (DD-299), the original name of USS John Francis Burnes (DD-299); Swasey was instead assigned to DD-273
- USS Swasey (DE-248), an Edsall-class destroyer escort commissioned in 1943 and decommissioned in 1946
