= Henry Vincent Hubbard =

American landscape architect

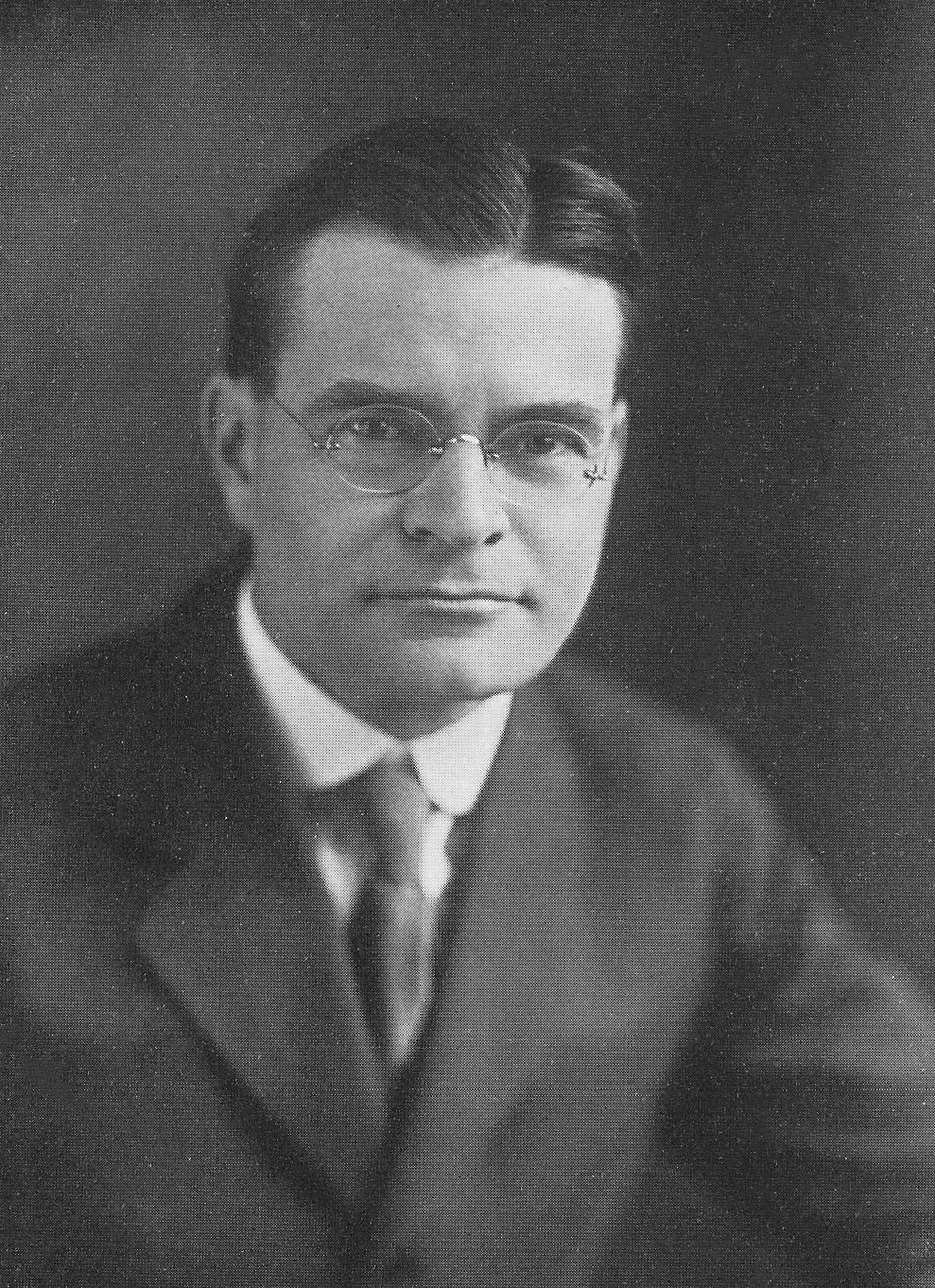
- Hubbard in 1897
- Born: August 22, 1875; Taunton, Massachusetts, U.S.
- Died: October 6, 1947 (aged 72); Milton, Massachusetts, U.S.
- Burial place: Mount Pleasant Cemetery
- Education: Harvard College, A.B. (1897); Harvard University, A.M., S.B. (1900, 1901)
- Occupation: Landscape architect
- Notable work: Jefferson Memorial landscape; Hilton Village
- Spouses: Theodora Kimball (m. 1924; died 1935) Isabel Fay Gerrish (m. 1937)

15th President of the American Society of Landscape Architects
- In office 1931 – 1935
- Preceded by: Arthur Asahel Shurcliff
- Succeeded by: Albert Davis Taylor

Henry Vincent Hubbard (August 22, 1875 – October 6, 1947) was an American landscape architect and planner, famous for his unique teaching styles at Harvard University, and his many publications. He was one of the prime supporters for a national system of public parks.

== Life and career ==
Hubbard was born August 22, 1875, in Taunton, Massachusetts, to Charles Thacher Hubbard and Clara Isabel Reed. He attended Taunton High School before going to Harvard University in 1893 to study architecture. He graduated in 1897 with a Bachelor of Arts. In 1897–1898, Hubbard studied architecture at the Massachusetts Institute of Technology which was where he decided to pursue landscape architecture. Since there was no instruction in this field, he returned to Harvard to study under Frederick Law Olmsted Jr. where he received a Master of Arts in 1900 and a Bachelor of Science in landscape architecture in 1901. Hubbard was the first person to earn a bachelor's degree in landscape architecture.

He later joined the Olmsted Brothers firm in Brookline, Massachusetts, where he later became partner. While working for their firm, Hubbard went back to Harvard in 1906 to teach landscape architecture. In 1911 Hubbard was appointed assistant professor of landscape architecture at Harvard University. During his thirty-three years of teaching, he focused on developing the profession of landscape architecture along with regional and city planning. Hubbard used real design problems in his classes, unlike the other professors. He also started a separate school in Harvard for city planning in 1929.

The Park von Muskau, officially Fürst-Pückler-Park.

In 1917, Hubbard wrote one of his own textbooks, An Introduction to the Study of Landscape Design. Co-authored by Theodora Kimball (his wife and colleague), this book became the standard text for landscape architecture for many years. It was considered the "bible" at Harvard for landscape architecture students. In his book, Hubbard divides the history of landscape architecture into humanized (formal) and naturalized (informal) styles. It also discusses the changes in European precedents and the use of "classical formulae," and emphasizes that modern design is based on a typological and pictorial approach, called the Beaux Arts approach. Many landscape designers started to view this approach as confining and sometimes oblivious to the conditions of society and spatial context.

One of Hubbard's main influences was the German prince Hermann von Pückler-Muskau, and his estate of Muskau. In An Introduction to the Study of Landscape Design, Hubbard states that Pückler is important not only because of his extensive amount of work as a designer, but also because of his considerable amount of ideological writing on the topic of landscape design. Because of Hubbard's book, Pückler's work became known to later generations of American landscape architects.

Hubbard was a member of the American Society of Landscape Architects (ASLA). In 1910, he founded and became the chief editor of their magazine, Landscape Architecture He also founded and became the chief editor of another magazine, City Planning Quarterly, in 1925. Hubbard became the president of the ASLA from 1931 to 1935. He spent twenty years as a planning consultant for the National Park Service, the Federal Housing Authority, and several cities. Hubbard was also an active member of the National Capital Park and Planning Commission (NCPPC), the President's Conference on Home Building and Home Ownership, and the American Academy in Rome.

Hubbard died October 6, 1947, at his home in Milton, Massachusetts. He was buried at Mount Pleasant Cemetery in Taunton, Massachusetts.

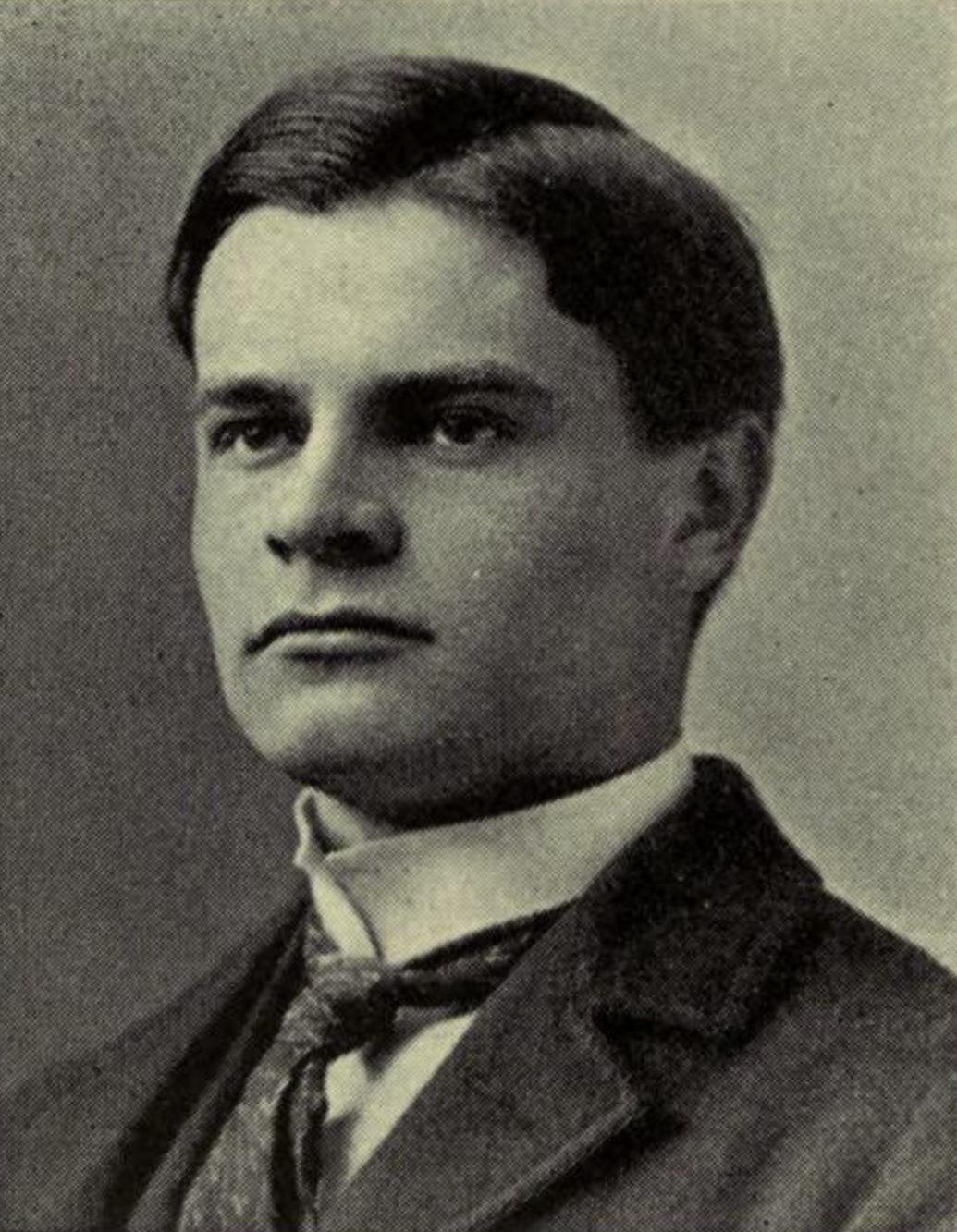
Henry Vincent Hubbard

=== The Book, An Introduction to the Study of Landscape Design ===
In this book, the Hubbards teach people how to completely understand the landscape design styles. The way is to study the history and the characteristics of the designers and to figure out the influence of their objects, circumstances, and sources. Those conditions really play an important part in landscape design and help to create the designers’ individual styles. In addition to that, the authors generalized about three factors of development of individual styles which are their surroundings, designers’ characters and usages. Those lead the directions and reveal on their designs. Moreover, a strong individual style gives people an impressive image and usually becomes the core of that era.

The Hubbards discussed the various styles of landscape design in this book.

The Moorish style in Spain—the gardens are filled with fruit trees, flowers and water features and encircled by buildings which protect people from outside. The vegetation makes shadows and water can cool the temperature down. Those are necessary for the hot and dry weather in the Moorish gardens. The garden of the Alhambra and the Generaliffe at Granada are the examples of the Moorish style in Spain.

The style of the Italian Renaissance and Baroque villas— the villas were designed for aristocrats and built on the hills with great view. This style is recognized by the adornment of sculptures, water features and complicated axial arrangement.

The style of Le Nôtre— the buildings and gardens were also designed for great nobles and changed into a large scale. The ornate decorations, symmetry and complicated geometric figures are the main elements of the Le Nôtre's style. Everything in the gardens is formal and ordered. The style of architecture and landscape design reveals the grand power and economy of kings and nobles. In 17th century of Europe, the style of Le Nôtre led a new stream and was imitated by many countries. For example, Versailles.

The Romantic landscape style— this style is not as formal as the formers been discussed and uses less geometrical shapes and axes. The design shows a simple and natural form.

The English cottage style— this style is much different than others. No beautiful decoration, grand buildings and ornate water fountains, instead of those were small gardens, low buildings and natural environment.

The Modern German formal style— the style also designed in the natural and simple way.

The Japanese styles— the Japanese garden contains more natural materials into its design. Everything in the gardens has its own meaning and combines to create beautiful scenery. It expresses harmonious and peaceful for people to relax and enlighten themselves.

=== Other books ===
- Hubbard, Theodora K. (1929). Our Cities, To-Day and To-Morrow; A Survey of Planning and Zoning Progress in the United States. Cambridge: Harvard University Press.

== Notable works and awards ==
- Jefferson Memorial landscape, Washington, D.C. (under Olmsted Jr.)
- Larchwood, neighborhood, Cambridge, MA
- Hilton Village, Virginia
- Harvard's Charles D. Norton chair of regional planning
- National Planning Pioneer, as designated by the American Institute of Certified Planners

== See also ==
- American Society of Landscape Architects
- Hermann von Pückler-Muskau
- Landscape architecture
- Park
