= Homer L. Ferguson =

American author and businessman

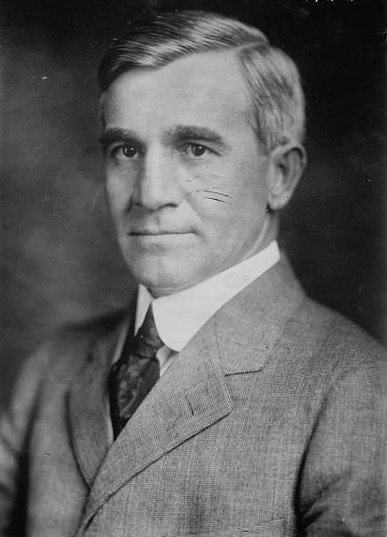
Homer L. Ferguson

Homer Lenoir Ferguson (March 6, 1873 – March 14, 1953) was an author and businessman. He was president of Newport News Shipbuilding & Dry Dock Company in Newport News, Virginia, from July 22, 1915, through July 31, 1946.

== Biography ==
Ferguson was born in Waynesville, North Carolina on March 6, 1873. At the age of fifteen he entered the United States Naval Academy and graduated at the head of his class in 1892. His education continued at the Glasgow University from 1892 through 1895, where he studied naval architecture.

While in the Navy he served as assistant naval constructor. He was at the Columbian Iron Works, Baltimore, Maryland, 1895–1896; at the Navy Yard, Portland, Oregon, 1896–1899; the Navy Yard, Bremerton, Washington, 1899–1900; at the Bath Iron Works, in Bath, Maine as Superintending Naval Constructor, 1900–1902; the Newport News Shipbuilding and Dry Dock Company at Newport News, Virginia, 1902–1904; and with the Bureau of Construction and Repair. Washington, D.C., 1904–1905.

In 1905 Ferguson resigned from the Navy and became assistant superintendent of Construction for Newport News Shipbuilding. During the next ten years, as Superintendent and later as general manager, he not only built up the physical property of the plant and improved methods of operation, but strengthened the personnel chiefly by the development of the young men in the organization. It was under Ferguson that the Apprentice School was founded to develop and train shipbuilders.

On May 7, 1915, shipyard president Albert L. Hopkins was traveling to England on the RMS Lusitania when he died after the ship was torpedoed and sunk by a German U-boat off Queenstown on the Irish coast. Another 127 Americans also lost their lives. The Lusitania incident was among the events that brought the United States into World War I. When Albert Hopkins died, Ferguson had been a vice president in the company for three years. By a unanimous decision by the company's Board of directors, he was elected to the presidency the following August. In that capacity, he was to see the company through both world wars.

Hilton Village

As war clouds loomed over the U.S. in 1917, Ferguson had a major role in the development of Hilton Village, located just northwest of the shipyard. In January 1918, Ferguson appeared before a United States Senate subcommittee investigating shipyard conditions. Ferguson was very persuasive regarding the impact of the war effort on the lack of housing for shipyard workers. With preliminary designs in hand and with the shipyard's offer to purchase land for the project, Ferguson was able to secure a $1.2 million appropriation to begin construction immediately. The Hilton Village project was the first of its kind and is recognized today as a pioneering urban planning project. Hilton Village served as the prototype of approximately 100 similar wartime government housing projects. After the war, in 1922, Henry E. Huntington, who had a close relationship with Ferguson, acquired it from the government, and helped facilitate the sale of the homes to shipyard employees and other local residents.

Ferguson and his wife, the former Eliza Anderson Skinner, raised five children and were active in many civic affairs in Newport News and Warwick County. He was president of the United States Chamber of Commerce, 1919–1920.

At the shipyard, Homer Ferguson served until July 31, 1946, after the Second World War had ended on both the European and Pacific fronts. As a noted community leader, he was a co-founder of the Mariners' Museum with Archer M. Huntington and his wife, sculptor Anna Hyatt. Ferguson remained active with the museum until his death.

Homer L. Ferguson died in 1953 of a heart attack at the age of 80. A few years later, his widow joined Martha Woodroof Hiden, another widow of a community leader (Phillip W. Hiden, a former Mayor of Newport News) in cutting the ceremonial ribbon to note the recombining of the former Warwick County, Virginia (which became an independent city in 1952) with Newport News, which had separated from the county to become a separate independent city in 1896, forming the consolidated "new" City of Newport News in 1958.

== Legacy ==
The former Homer L. Ferguson High School of Newport News Public Schools was named for him.

At the Mariners' Museum in Newport News, the Ferguson Society, named for Ferguson, is a patron society for those who donate $1,000 – $2,499. Ferguson, along with the Huntington family, laid the foundation for the Museum.

"Ferguson Avenue" in the National Register of Historic Places neighborhood of Hilton Village is named after Ferguson.
