= USS Varuna (1861) =

Gunboat of the United States Navy

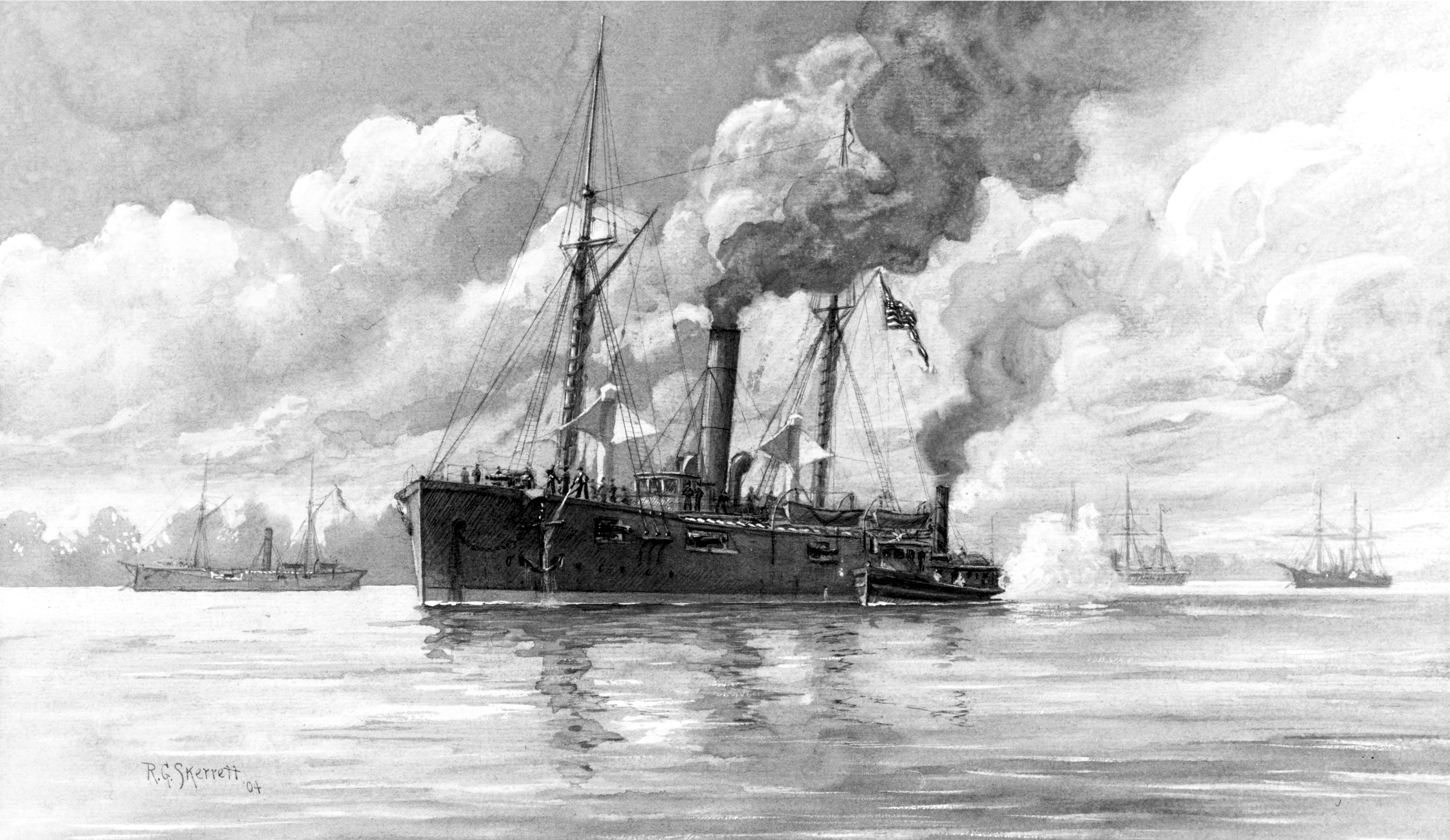
- USS Varuna, as drawn in 1904

History

United States
- Namesake: Varuna
- Builder: Charles Mallory & Sons
- Cost: $127,460 ($4,570,000 today)
- Laid down: January or February 1861
- Launched: September 1861
- Acquired: 31 December 1861
- Commissioned: February 1862
- Fate: Sunk in action 24 April 1862

General characteristics
- Type: Screw gunboat
- Tons burthen: 1,247 tons burthen or 1,300 tons
- Length: 218 ft (66 m)
- Beam: 34 ft 8 in (10.57 m)
- Draft: 12 ft (3.7 m)
- Depth of hold: 18 ft 3 in (5.56 m)
- Installed power: Vibrating-lever steam engine(s)
- Propulsion: Single screw propeller
- Speed: 14 kn (26 km/h; 16 mph) (designed)
- Complement: 157
- Armament: 8× 8-inch (20 cm) Dahlgren guns; 2× 30-pounder Parrott rifles

USS Varuna was a screw steamer acquired by the Union Navy during the American Civil War. Union naval strategy called for a blockade of the Confederate coastline, but the acquisition of many additional ships was necessary to accomplish this. One of the new vessels purchased was Varuna, which was still under construction when the sale occurred on 31 December 1861. Commissioned in February 1862, she traveled to join the West Gulf Blockading Squadron. The squadron was under the command of Flag Officer David Glasgow Farragut and was tasked with the capture of New Orleans, Louisiana.

In order to reach New Orleans, the Confederate positions at Fort Jackson and Fort St. Philip had to be passed. On the morning of 24 April, Farragut led his ships in an attempt to pass the forts. During the ensuing action, Varuna ran ahead of the other Union ships, and she was engaged in a chase with the Louisiana gunboat Governor Moore. The two ships exchanged cannon fire before Governor Moore rammed Varuna twice. Another Confederate vessel added a third ramming blow. Varuna sank within 15 minutes, but Farragut was able to capture New Orleans.

== Construction and characteristics ==
When the American Civil War broke out in April 1861, the Union adopted a naval strategy resembling the Anaconda Plan, which had been proposed by Commanding General of the United States Army Winfield Scott. This involved blockading the Confederate coastline and taking control of the Mississippi River, in order to cut the Confederacy off from foreign trade. At the beginning of the war, the Union Navy had only 42 ships still considered active, with others mothballed and in poor condition. Many of the existing active ships were too large to enter ports that would need to be blockaded. The Union found itself needing a large number of new ships in order to fulfill the new operation's goals. (Note: By the end of the war in 1865, the number of ships operated by the navy was nearly 700, including non-combat support vessels.)

Varuna, a wooden-hulled screw steamship, was named after a Vedic deity associated with the skies and seas. She was built by Charles Mallory & Sons of Mystic, Connecticut, on their own account, in anticipation of finding a buyer for her in merchant service on the trade route between New York City and New Orleans, Louisiana. Cornelius S. Bushnell of New Haven, Connecticut, eventually acquired a half-share in the $135,000 ship (equivalent to $4,840,000 in 2025), while Charles Mallory retained ownership of the other half. The vessel was laid down in late January or early February 1861 and launched the following September, but while still under construction, she was purchased on behalf of the Union Navy at New York City on 31 December for the sum of $127,460—the price reduction representing the difference between completing her for naval rather than merchant service.

Varuna was 218 feet (66 m) long, and had a beam of 34 feet 8 inches (10.57 m). Her depth of hold was 18 feet 3 inches (5.56 m). According to the Dictionary of American Naval Fighting Ships (DANFS) the ship had a tonnage of 1,300 tons, while other sources give a figure of 1,247 tons burthen. The vessel was powered by vibrating-lever engines (Note: Boggs describes the engines as "Ericsson side-lever pattern". "Side-lever" in this context should not be confused with the same term commonly employed for the early type of paddle engine obsolete by the 1850s and not suitable for screw propulsion. Additionally, Boggs' reference to "engines", plural, does not necessarily mean the ship was powered by more than one engine, as sources from the era commonly fail to distinguish between number of engines and number of engine cylinders, and the vibrating-lever engine was a twin-cylinder design.)—a new type of marine steam engine, patented by John Ericsson, which at the time were also being fitted to the first generation of U.S. Navy ironclad warships. Varuna's engines, which drove a single screw propeller, were designed to deliver a service speed of 14 knots (26 km/h; 16 mph) at a draft of 12 feet (3.7 m)—a fast speed for a steamship of the period. (Note: By way of comparison with Varuna's projected speed of 14 knots, the record-breaking transatlantic steamship Scotia, built in 1862, won the Blue Riband in 1863 with an average speed of 14.46 knots. While Varuna's actual speed in service is not known, her commander claimed that she was "the fastest vessel of the fleet.") Both engines and boilers were built by the Reliance Machine Company of Mystic.

Varuna's crew numbered 157. She was armed with eight 8-inch (20 cm) Dahlgren guns and two 30-pound (14 kg) Parrott rifles. (Note: Parrott rifles were a type of rifled artillery invented by former United States Army officer Robert Parker Parrott. The guns were not the best available, and some of the larger sizes had a tendency to explode when fired, but could be produced cheaply and quickly, and did not require extensive experience to operate.) Gaines describes Varuna as either a sloop or a corvette, while DANFS describes her as a screw gunboat.

== Service history ==
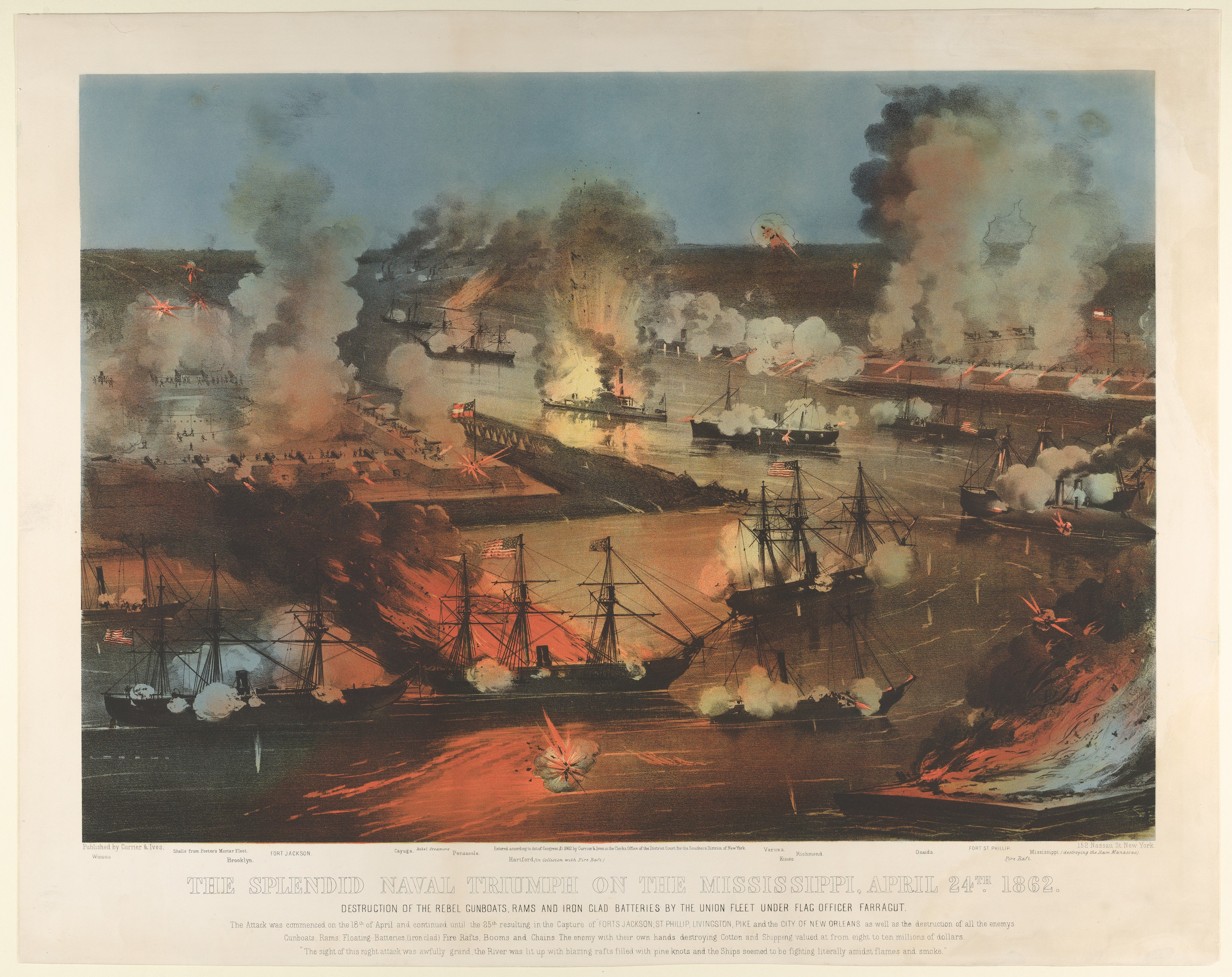
An 1862 Currier & Ives depiction of the Battle of Forts Jackson and St. Philip

Varuna was commissioned in February 1862. On 10 February, she was briefly ordered to wait in New York City while the USS Monitor was completed, so that she could escort the ironclad to Hampton Roads. By the end of the day, the order had been revoked, and Varuna was assigned to the West Gulf Blockading Squadron. On her way to join the squadron, Varuna called at the port of Port Royal, South Carolina. As the Union commander at Port Royal, Flag Officer Samuel Du Pont, was absent on an expedition south along the Confederate coastline, Varuna's captain, Commander Charles S. Boggs, temporarily took command of the area. Varuna would not reach the West Gulf Blockading Squadron until 6 March.

In January, the commander of the West Gulf Blockading Squadron, Flag Officer David Glasgow Farragut, had been tasked with capturing New Orleans for the Union. Farragut would have both a fleet of warships taken from blockade duties and the Mortar Flotilla. In late February, he arrived at Ship Island, a strategic island off the coast of Mississippi, and after preparations, the advance up the Mississippi towards New Orleans began on 15 April. The mortars of the Mortar Flotilla began bombarding two Confederate forts downriver from New Orleans – Fort Jackson and Fort St. Philip – on 18 April, with the shelling continuing for another five days. Union vessels were able to breach a barricade erected in the river on 20 April, and at 02:00 on 24 April, Farragut's ships began moving against the two forts, bringing on the Battle of Forts Jackson and St. Philip.

=== Varuna sunk in action ===
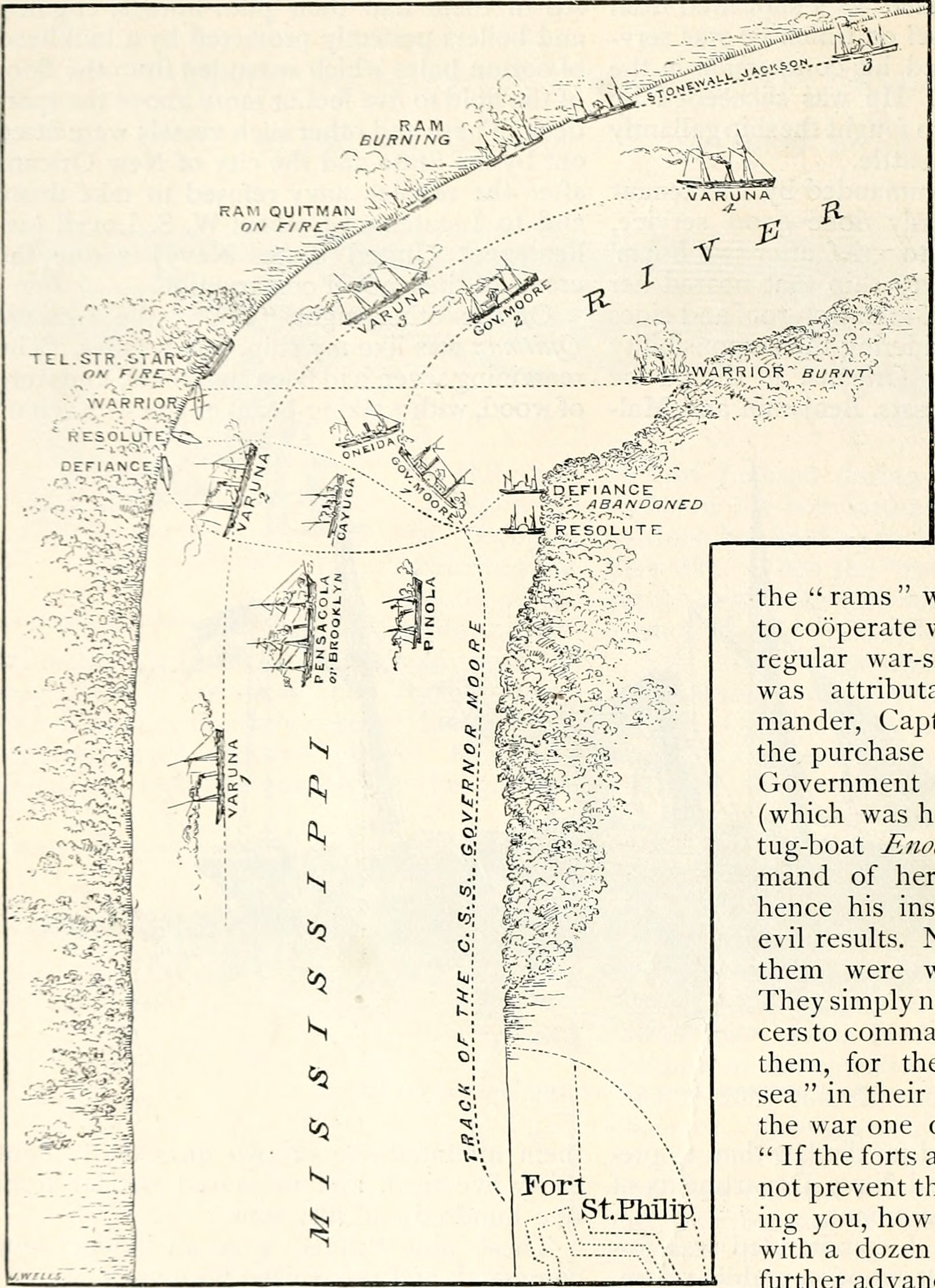
A map of the movements of Varuna, Governor Moore, and some of the other ships in the battle, as published in an 1880s article in The Century Magazine

Farragut assigned 17 warships for the attack on the forts, dividing them into three groups. Varuna was one of eight ships in the first group, which was tasked with moving up the eastern side of the river to engage Fort St. Philip. Before the action, Farragut had anchor chains fastened to the outside of the ships, serving as a form of makeshift armor for the parts of the ships that contained their engines and machinery. Confederate fire opened at around 03:40. Varuna steamed past the forts quickly, with the ship's crew attempting to raise additional steam by burning barrels of pork. Visibility was severely limited for both sides during the Union ships' rush upriver. Varuna fired upon several Confederate vessels visible to either side, before encountering and firing into an engagement between other ships. Varuna's fire caused friendly fire casualties on the Unadilla-class gunboat Cayuga. Having broken formation, Varuna continued upriver at full steam, despite having engine trouble with low boiler pressure. Now the leading Union ship, she was spotted by the State of Louisiana gunboat Governor Moore. Varuna could be identified by red identification light she had on her masthead, as the Confederate vessels used blue lights for this purpose.

The two ships then began a chase upriver. The commander of Governor Moore ordered lights similar to those Varuna displayed on his ship as a ruse. When the Confederate vessel caught up with Varuna shortly before daylight, the decoy lights were taken down and Governor Moore opened fire. Governor Moore fired with the chase gun on her bow, while Varuna fired with her stern chase gun. The gunboat CSS Jackson briefly fired into the melee, but she then continued upriver to New Orleans. Varuna tried to turn to face her broadside towards Governor Moore, but the move was countered; the two ships fired into each other at a range of 40 yards (37 m). Governor Moore approached yet closer, but found that her forward gun could not be depressed enough to rake Varuna's deck, so her captain ordered the gun fired through her own deck, with the hole serving as a gun port. A second shot through the hole killed three men aboard Varuna and wounded others.

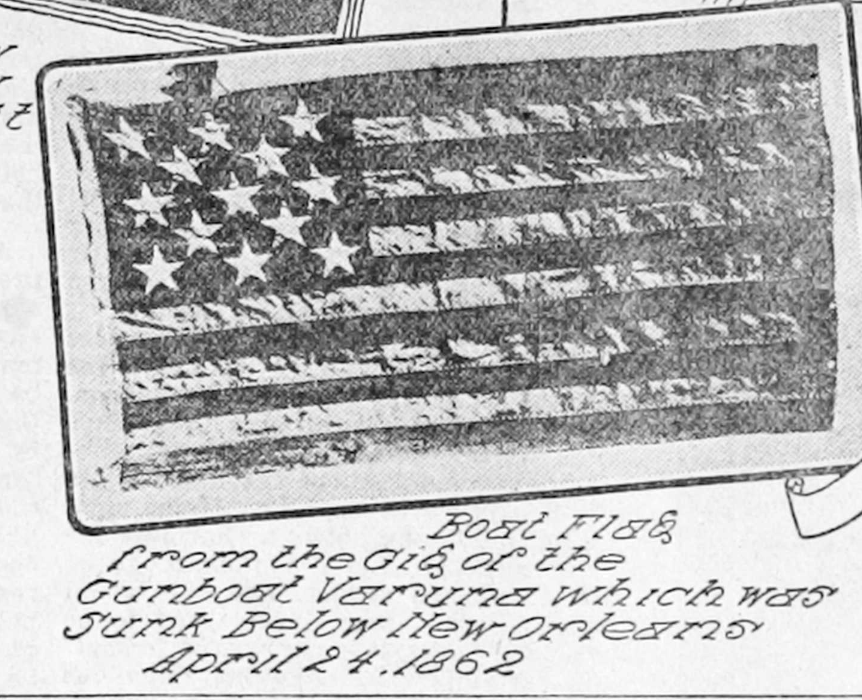
An illustration of the American flag that was flown from Varuna

At this point, the two ships were about 10 feet (3.0 m) apart, but their crews could barely see each other due to dense smoke. It was now about 06:00, and the ships were at a point about 9 miles (14 km) upriver from the forts. Varuna turned to starboard to allow for a broadside to be fired from that side of the ship. The broadside caused great destruction on Governor Moore's deck, but Governor Moore rammed Varuna, knocking out the Union ship's engines. Governor Moore then backed off and rammed Varuna again. Varuna was now sinking rapidly, and steered towards the riverbank. Another gunboat then arrived and rammed Varuna. (Note: Naval historian Chester G. Hearn and historian John D. Winters state that the third ramming blow was delivered by the gunboat CSS R. J. Breckinridge, while the naval historians Neil Chatelain and W. Craig Gaines state that it was from CSS Stonewall Jackson. Commander Beverly Kennon, the commander of Governor Moore, in his after-action report, identified R. J. Breckinridge as the vessel that struck the final blow. Lieutenant Charles Swasey, the executive officer of Varuna, identified Stonewall Jackson as the vessel that struck in the blow in his report.) Varuna sank within 15 minutes, with her guns still firing as she went down. For their actions in the engagement, eight sailors aboard the vessel were later awarded the Medal of Honor. Varuna's survivors were rescued by Oneida. Governor Moore in turn was scuttled not long after her victory over Varuna; over three-quarters of her crew had been killed or wounded.

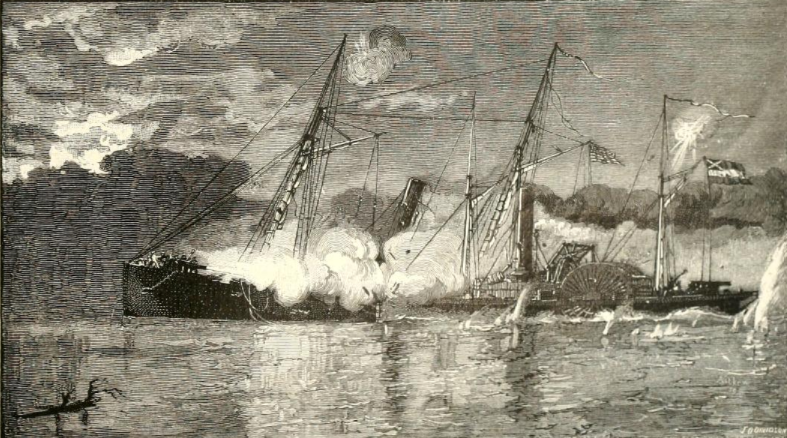
Varuna being rammed during the battle, as depicted in The Century Magazine in the 1880s

The executive officer of Varuna, Lieutenant Charles Swasey, claimed after the battle that Varuna's guns had set four Confederate ships afire, and Boggs additionally claimed Governor Moore as a victim of Varuna. Boggs wrote in his official report dated 29 April that four members of the ship's crew were killed and nine wounded, and that four of the Marines aboard were also wounded; while the report of Acting Assistant Paymaster Charles Fitch dated 6 May reports that three men from Varuna were confirmed to have been killed. Gaines lists the vessel's casualties as three killed and twelve wounded. Swasey attributed the vessel's sinking to her design as a merchant vessel, which Swasey considered to be inadequate for a warship.

As Union vessels moved upriver, they passed the wreck of Varuna, whose flags were still visible above the water. The ships dipped their colors as they passed by the wreck site. By mid-morning, Farragut had 13 of his ships upriver past the forts. Most of the Confederate ships present had been sunk, and the two forts surrendered on 28 April, after their garrisons mutinied. After neutralizing Confederate defenses at Chalmette on 25 April, the Union vessels entered New Orleans. The fall of the city was a major defeat for the Confederates. DANFS states that Varuna "contributed greatly" to the Union victory, and George Henry Boker wrote a poem commemorating the vessel. Her wreck was partially visible in 1885, and a 1981 expedition led by Clive Cussler located a signal with a gradiometer near where she is believed to have sunk.

== Sources ==
=== Secondary ===
- Browning, Robert M. (2015). Lincoln's Trident: The West Gulf Blockading Squadron During the Civil War. Tuscaloosa, Alabama: University of Alabama Press. ISBN 978-0-8173-1846-8.
- Calore, Paul (2002). Naval Campaigns of the Civil War. Jefferson, North Carolina: McFarland & Company. ISBN 978-0-7864-1217-4.
- Chatelain, Neil P. (2020). Defending the Arteries of Rebellion: Confederate Naval Operations in the Mississippi River Valley, 1861–1865. El Dorado Hills, California: Savas Beatie. ISBN 978-1-61121-510-6.
- Gaines, W. Craig (2008). Encyclopedia of Civil War Shipwrecks. Baton Rouge, Louisiana: Louisiana State University Press. ISBN 978-0-8071-3274-6.
- Griffiths, Denis (1997). Steam at Sea: Two Centuries of Steam-Powered Ships. London: Conway Maritime Press. ISBN 0851776663.
- Hearn, Chester G. (1995). The Capture of New Orleans, 1862. Baton Rouge, Louisiana: Louisiana State University Press. ISBN 0-8071-1945-8.
- Kludas, Arnold (2000). Record Breakers of the North Atlantic: Blue Riband Liners 1838-1952. Dulles, VA: Brassey's Inc. ISBN 9781574883282.
- Luraghi, Raimondo (1996). A History of the Confederate Navy. Annapolis, Maryland: Naval Institute Press. ISBN 978-1-55750-527-9.
- Lytle, William M.; Holdcamper, Forrest H. (1975). Mitchell, C. Bradford (ed.). Merchant Steam Vessels of the United States 1790–1868 (The Lytle-Holdcamper List). Staten Island, New York: The Steamship Historical Society of America, Inc. OCLC 22040526
- McPherson, James M. (2012). War on the Waters: The Union and Confederate Navies, 1861–1865. Chapel Hill, North Carolina: University of North Carolina Press. ISBN 978-0-8078-3588-3.
- Peterson, William M. (1989). Mystic Built: Ships and Shipyards of the Mystic River, Connecticut, 1784-1919. Mystic, CT: Mystic Seaport Museum, Inc. ISBN 091337251X.
- Ripley, Warren (1970). Artillery and Ammunition of the Civil War. New York, New York: Promontory Press. ISBN 0-88394-003-5.
- Silverstone, Paul H. (1989). Warships of the Civil War Navies. Annapolis, Maryland: Naval Institute Press. ISBN 0-87021-783-6.
- Silverstone, Paul H. (2016). Civil War Navies 1855-1883. The U.S. Navy Warship Series. New York: Routledge. ISBN 978-1-138-99135-4.
- Winters, John D. (1991) [1963]. The Civil War in Louisiana. Baton Rouge, Louisiana: Louisiana State University Press. ISBN 0-8071-1725-0.

=== Primary ===
- Boggs, Charles S. (1904). "Report of Commander Boggs, U. S. Navy, Commanding U. S. S. Varuna". In Stewart, Charles W. (ed.). Official Records of the Union and Confederate Navies in the War of the Rebellion. 1. Vol. 18. Washington, D.C.: Government Printing Office. pp. 210–211. OCLC 427057.
- Fitch, Charles T. (1904). "Report of Acting Assistant Paymaster Fitch, U. S. Navy, of the U. S. S. Varuna". In Stewart, Charles W. (ed.). Official Records of the Union and Confederate Navies in the War of the Rebellion. 1. Vol. 18. Washington, D.C.: Government Printing Office. pp. 214–215. OCLC 427057.
- Kennon, Beverly (1904). "Report of Commander Beverly Kennon, Late Commanding the State of Louisiana Gunboat Governor Moore, Date May 4, 1862". In Stewart, Charles W. (ed.). Official Records of the Union and Confederate Navies in the War of the Rebellion. 1. Vol. 18. Washington, D.C.: Government Printing Office. pp. 304–309. OCLC 427057.
- Official Records of the Union and Confederate Navies in the War of the Rebellion, Series 2. U. S. Naval War Records Office. Office memoranda. Vol. 1. Washington, D.C.: Government Printing Office. 1921.
- Swasey, Charles H. (1904). "Report of Lieutenant Swasey, U. S. Navy, Executive Office of the U. S. S. Varuna". In Stewart, Charles W. (ed.). Official Records of the Union and Confederate Navies in the War of the Rebellion. 1. Vol. 18. Washington, D.C.: Government Printing Office. pp. 212–214. OCLC 427057.
