= Harwood (surname) =

Harwood is a surname, and may refer to:

== A ==
- A. R. Harwood (Alexander Roy Harwood) (1897–1980), Australian film director
- Andrew Harwood (television host) (1945–2008), Australian quiz show host, announcer and actor
- Andrew Harwood (cricketer) (born 1964), English cricketer
- Andrew A. Harwood (1802–1884), admiral in the United States Navy
- Antoine Chartier de Lotbinière Harwood (1825–1891), Quebec lawyer and political figure
- Aurelia Harwood (1865–1928), American conservationist and educator

== B ==
- Barney Harwood (born 1979), English television presenter
- Baron Harwood (1852–1915), English cricketer
- Basil Harwood (1859–1949), English organist and composer
- Benjamin F. Harwood (c.1818–1856), American lawyer and politician from New York
- Bill Harwood (1920–1980), Australian rules footballer
- Bo Harwood (1946–2022), American composer
- Brown Harwood (1872–1963), American realtor and Ku Klux Klan leader
- Bruce Harwood (born 1963), Canadian actor
- Busick Harwood (c.1745–1814), English physician
- C. William Harwood (1948–1984), American conductor

== C ==
- Carol Harwood, English footballer
- Caroline Harwood, American microbiologist
- Cecil Harwood (1898–1975), English anthroposophist, Waldorf teacher and writer
- Charles Harwood (1880–1950), American lawyer and politician from New York, Governor of the United States Virgin Islands
- Charles E. Harwood (1851–1924), American politician from Massachusetts
- Chris Harwood (born 1994), American cricketer

== D ==
- Dax Harwood (born 1984), American professional wrestler
- Dick Harwood (born 1947), American politician from Idaho
- Dwight Harwood (1892–1965), American football and basketball coach

== E ==
- Edgar N. Harwood (1854–1936), American judge
- Edward Harwood (1729–1794), English classical scholar and biblical critic
- Edward Harwood (American inventor) (1950–2021), American inventor, entrepreneur and aeroponics pioneer
- Edward Harwood (military officer) (died 1632), English army officer
- Edward Harwood (of Darwen) (1707–1787), English composer
- Edward Harwood (Virginia politician) (c. 1740 – after 1807) American planter and politician from Virginia
- Edward C. Harwood (1900–1980), American economist
- Elain Harwood (1958–2023), British architectural historian
- Elizabeth Harwood (1938–1990), English opera soprano
- Ena Harwood (1913–1993), Australian television and radio personality

== F ==
- Frederick Harwood (1827–1887), English cricketer

== G ==
- George Harwood (1845–1912), British businessman and politician
- Gwen Harwood (1920–1995), Australian poet and librettist
- Guy Harwood (born 1938), British racehorse trainer

== H ==
- Henry Harwood (1888–1950), British naval officer
- Henry R. Harwood (c.1831–1898), Australian actor and theatre manager
- Henry Stanislas Harwood (1838–1911), Canadian politician
- Herbert H. Harwood Jr. (born 1931), American railroad historian
- Hokimate Harwood, New Zealand Māori scientist
- Humphrey Harwood (c.1649–1700), soldier, landowner and politician in colonial Virginia
- H. M. Harwood (1874–1959), British businessman, playwright, screenwriter and theatre manager

== I ==
- Ian Harwood (1931–2011), English lutenist and musical instrument maker
- Irvine Harwood (1905–1973), English footballer
- Isabella Harwood (1837–1888), British novelist

== J ==
- James Taylor Harwood (1860–1940), American painter and engraver
- Jim Harwood (1938–1993), American journalist, film critic and screenwriter
- Johanna Harwood (born 1930), Irish screenwriter
- John Harwood (journalist) (born 1956), American journalist
- John Harwood (watchmaker) (1893–1965), English horologist who developed first self-winding watch
- John Harwood (writer) (born 1946), Australian poet and novelist
- John Berwick Harwood (1828–1899), English writer
- John B. Harwood (born 1952), American politician from Rhode Island
- Joseph Harwood (born 1990), British model, artist and social media personality
- June Harwood (1933–2015), American painter
- Justin Harwood, New Zealand bass guitarist

== K ==
- Kate Harwood (fl. since 2005), British television producer
- Keith Harwood (1950–1977), British recording engineer
- Kenneth Harwood (born 1924), American information theorist

== L ==
- Lee Harwood (1939–2015), British poet
- Lee Harwood (footballer) (born 1960)
- Lucas Harwood, Australian bassist
- Lucy Harwood (1893–1972), English artist

== M ==
- Malcolm Harwood (born 1938), English poker player
- Margaret Harwood (1885–1979), American astronomer
- Marian Fleming Harwood (1846–1934), Australian linguist, pacifist, and philanthropist
- Margaret Gentle Harwood (c.1925–2004), British educator in West Africa
- Mark Harwood (born 1978), Australian rules footballer
- Marli Harwood (born 1975), British singer and songwriter
- Matire Harwood, New Zealand general practitioner and researcher
- Max Harwood (born 1997), English actor
- Michael Harwood (author) (1934–1989), American naturalist, environmentalist and author
- Michael Harwood (musician) (born 1975), guitarist for the band Ultra
- Michael Harwood (RAF officer) (born 1958), British Royal Air Force officer
- Mike Harwood (born 1959), Australian golfer

== N ==
- Nancy Harwood (born 1948), American Playboy centerfold
- Norman Harwood (1929–2008), New Zealand cricketer

== P ==
- Paul Harwood (born 1977), English cricketer
- Pearl A. Harwood (1903–1998), American librarian and writer of children's books
- Peter Harwood (born 1947), Guernsey lawyer and politician
- Philip Harwood (1809–1887), English journalist and Unitarian minister

== R ==
- Ralph Endersby Harwood (1883–1951), British courtier
- Reuben Harwood, 19th-century American gunwriter and cartridge designer
- Richard Harwood (born 1979), British cellist
- Richard Harwood, pseudonym of Richard Verrall (political writer) (born 1948), English politician and Holocaust denier
- Rob Harwood (born 1997), Scottish field hockey player
- Robert Harwood (cricketer) (1923–1992), New Zealand cricketer
- Robert Harwood (politician) (1826–1897), Canadian politician
- Robert Unwin Harwood (1798–1863), Canadian politician
- Robert B. Harwood (1902–1991), American judge
- Robert Unwin Harwood (1798–1863), Canadian politician
- Ronald Harwood (1934–2020), British playwright and writer
- Ryan Harwood (born 1991), Australian rules footballer

== S ==
- Sandra Harwood (born 1950), American politician
- Shane Harwood (born 1974), Australian cricketer
- Shuna Harwood (born 1940), British costume designer
- Simon Harwood, British police officer involved in the death of Ian Tomlinson
- Stanley Harwood (1926–2010), American politician from New York

== T ==
- Taylor Harwood-Bellis (born 2002), English footballer
- Tom Harwood (born 1996), British political commentator
- Thomas Harwood (c.1600–1652), English soldier, landowner and politician in colonial Virginia
- Thomas Harwood (priest) (1767–1842), English cleric, schoolmaster and antiquarian

== V ==
- Vanessa Harwood (born 1947), Canadian ballet dancer and choreographer
- Victoria Harwood (born 1961), English voice actress

== W ==
- William Harwood, Jr. (died 1780), militia colonel, landowner and politician in colonial Virginia
- William Harwood (burgess) (died 1737), landowner and politician in colonial Virginia
- William Harwood (councillor) (c. 1589 – after 1635), soldier, landowner and politician in colonial Virginia
- William Harwood (photographer) (1883–1976), Welsh photographer
- William Henry Harwood (1840–1917), English entomologist
- William R. Harwood, American author and skeptic

== See also ==
- Harewood (surname)
