= William Harwood =

William Harwood may refer to:

- William Harwood (councillor) (c. 1589–after 1635), soldier, landowner and politician in the Colony of Virginia
- William Harwood (burgess) (died 1737), landowner and politician in the Colony of Virginia
- William Harwood, Jr. (died 1780), militia colonel, landowner and politician in the Colony of Virginia
- William Harwood (photographer) (1883–1976), Welsh photographer and postcard collector
- William R. Harwood, American author and skeptic
- C. William Harwood (1948–1984), American conductor
- Bill Harwood (1920–1980), Australian rules footballer
