= Denbigh, Virginia =

Community in Virginia, US

Coordinates: 37°07′41″N 76°32′22″W

Denbigh is a community in Newport News, Virginia. It was previously the County Seat of Warwick County, Virginia until the county became the independent city of Warwick, Virginia in 1952. Warwick and Newport News merged in 1958 to form the present-day city of Newport News.

== History ==
Denbigh was named for Denbigh Plantation, which was patented by Captain Samuel Matthews, who came to Virginia before 1618, filled several important posts, and became the father of Lt. Col. Samuel Mathews, a colonial governor of the Virginia Commonwealth from 1656 to 1660. His son John Mathews (b. 1659 – May 1, 1706) lived at the plantation until sometime after receiving a land grant for several thousand acres just south of this area 1678. He married Elizabeth Tavernor on March 24, 1684. The Cole-Digges family acquired the plantation between 1698 and 1720.

Denbigh was also the name given to the colonial Anglican Parish in the area, which existed from 1635 until it was disestablished by the Virginia Statute for Religious Freedom in 1786. An archeological site still exists in the area where the original 1636 church building stood, and a historical marker near the later 1686 site.

The first courthouse and jail were located nearby, at Warwick Towne, established in 1680. The colonial port was located at Deep Creek and the Warwick River on 50 acres (200,000 m^{2}) of Samuel Mathews' land. In 1790, Warwick County recorded 1,690 persons in the Federal Census, making it the third-smallest county population-wise in Virginia. After the American Revolution, in 1809, Warwick Towne was abandoned, and the county seat was moved to the area near Stoney Run.

The town of Denbigh was the county seat of Warwick County from 1810 until 1952, except for a short period from 1888 to 1896 when the courthouse was located in what is now downtown Newport News. It was moved back to Denbigh when Newport News became an independent city in 1896.

Warwick County became an independent city itself in 1952. Six years later, in 1958, the City of Warwick consolidated with the independent City of Newport News, assuming the latter's better-known name.

== Denbigh as a neighborhood of Newport News ==
The present-day City of Newport News essentially includes all the territory of Warwick River Shire, formed in 1634 in commonwealth Virginia, which became Warwick County in 1643. The former town of Denbigh is now considered a neighborhood area of Newport News. The preserved 1810 Warwick County Courthouse at Denbigh is now a museum.

The Denbigh neighborhood is in the north side of the city, and covers most of the area around the former town. Denbigh Boulevard, which for much of its length carries State Route 173, is a north–south connector road linking the two main east–west arterial roads running through the city, U.S. Route 60 (Warwick Boulevard) and State Route 143 (Jefferson Avenue). Many businesses and shopping centers are located along this road. Denbigh High School, located on Denbigh Boulevard, is part of the Newport News Public Schools division.

== See also ==
- Denbigh Plantation Site
- First Denbigh Parish Church Archeological Site
- Warwick County Courthouses
- Warwick County, Virginia
- Newport News, Virginia
- List of former counties, cities, and towns of Virginia
