= SS Samleyte =

World War II Liberty ship of the United States

History

United States
- Name: Samleyte
- Ordered: as type (EC2-S-C1) hull, MC hull 2355
- Builder: J.A. Jones Construction, Brunswick, Georgia
- Cost: $1,051,651
- Yard number: 140
- Way number: 6
- Laid down: 7 March 1944
- Launched: 20 April 1944
- Sponsored by: Mrs. Palmer Hoyt
- Completed: 29 April 1944
- Fate: Transferred to the British Ministry of War Transport upon completion.

United Kingdom
- Name: Samleyte
- Acquired: 29 April 1944
- Identification: Call Signal: GSXC
- Fate: Laid up in National Defense Reserve Fleet, James River Group, Lee Hall, Virginia, 4 November 1947; Sold for scrapping, 17 July 1959

General characteristics
- Class & type: Liberty ship; type EC2-S-C1, standard
- Tonnage: 10,865 LT DWT; 7,176 GRT
- Displacement: 3,380 long tons (3,434 t) (light); 14,245 long tons (14,474 t) (max)
- Length: 441 feet 6 inches (135 m) oa; 416 feet (127 m) pp; 427 feet (130 m) lwl
- Beam: 57 feet (17 m)
- Draft: 27 ft 9.25 in (8.4646 m)
- Installed power: 2 × Oil fired 450 °F (232 °C) boilers, operating at 220 psi (1,500 kPa); 2,500 hp (1,900 kW)
- Propulsion: 1 × triple-expansion steam engine, (manufactured by Filer and Stowell, Milwaukee, Wisconsin); 1 × screw propeller
- Speed: 11.5 knots (21.3 km/h; 13.2 mph)
- Capacity: 562,608 cubic feet (15,931 m^{3}) (grain); 499,573 cubic feet (14,146 m^{3}) (bale)
- Complement: 38–62 USMM; 21–40 USNAG
- Armament: Varied by ship; Bow-mounted 3-inch (76 mm)/50-caliber gun; Stern-mounted 4-inch (102 mm)/50-caliber gun; 2–8 × single 20-millimeter (0.79 in) Oerlikon anti-aircraft (AA) cannons and/or, 2–8 × 37-millimeter (1.46 in) M1 AA guns

SS Samleyte was a Liberty ship built in the United States during World War II. She was transferred to the British Ministry of War Transportation (MoWT) upon completion.

== Construction ==
Samleyte was laid down on 7 March 1944, under a United States Maritime Commission (MARCOM) contract, MC hull 2355, by J.A. Jones Construction, Brunswick, Georgia; sponsored by Mrs. Palmer Hoyt, and launched on 20 April 1944.

== History ==
She was turned over to the British Ministry of War Transport, on 29 April 1944. On 4 November 1947, she was laid up in the US National Defense Reserve Fleet, in the James River Group, Lee Hall, Virginia. While there, she was used for experimenting the use of cathodic protection (CP) as a preservation method. She was sold to Bethlehem Steel Company, on 17 July 1959, and removed from the fleet on 21 July 1959.

== Bibliography ==
- "Jones Construction, Brunswick GA". ShipbuildingHistory.com. 13 October 2010.
- "Liberty Ships – World War II".
- Maritime Administration. "Samleyte". Ship History Database Vessel Status Card. U.S. Department of Transportation, Maritime Administration. Archived from the original on 12 December 2019.
- Davies, James (May 2004). "Specifications (As-Built)" (PDF). p. 23.
- "SS Samleyte".
