= The Colony (Denbigh, Virginia) =

Mennonite colony in Virginia, US

- Founder: Isaac Hertzler and David Z. Yoder

Area
  - Total: 490 ha (1,200 acres)

The Colony was a settlement of Mennonites in Warwick County, Virginia in the 1900s, in what is present day Newport News. The land was bordered on the west by the Warwick River, and on the north by Lucas Creek. The land was acquired in August 1897.

== Timeline ==
=== 1890s ===
In May 1897, I. D. Hertzler (Maryland), and D. Z. Yoder (Fauquier County, Virginia) arrived to see the land which had been advertised by railroad developer Collis Potter Huntington. They rejected the land at Kingsmill, Green Spring, and Beaconsdale. While stopping at Kellam's store, they learned about the tract on the Warwick River. They rode back to Oriana Station and stayed at the Smith Hotel near the Warwick Courthouse. The next day they met at Owen's Landing and went down Lucas Creek to the Warwick River. Dr. Young had 890 acres of land known as Quarterfield, and Horse Point, an additional 359-acre parcel on the east back of the Warwick River.

In August 1897, the contract for the land was signed by Hertzler and Yoder with the Youngs, and celebrated with an oyster roast. They paid $500 and other "good and valuable considerations".

In September 1897, Anna Moyer Hahn and Jacob Hahn of Michigan moved to the Colony.

In 1898, Bishop J. M. Shenk preached at Horse Point house. The first baby was born, Virginia Etta Kraus. The first wedding took place in February, in the home of David Yoder.

In 1899, the church was organized, and a 20-by-30-foot meeting house and school was built on Lucas Creek Road.

=== 1900s ===
By 1900, twenty Mennonite and Amish families had arrived via train and wagon, including Amanda and Samuel Kraus, Barbara and Daniel Hooley, Elias and Elizabeth Hartzler Miller, Peter and Simon Smucker, Eli Smucker and other Yoder families.

In 1900, Providence Amish Mennonite Church was organized, with David Z. Yoder as the first pastor. The building can still be seen on Warwick Boulevard near the intersection with Oyster Point Road.

In 1902, John Mast, George and Katie Wenger Brunk, Jacob and Belle Diffenderfer King, J. Harvey Yoder, the Glicks, Shanks, and Zooks arrived. A schoolhouse was built at the site of the later Denbigh Elementary School.

In 1904, J. Harvey Yoder helped establish a literary society for the young people of the church.

In 1905, the first church wedding occurred on January 1, between Clara Shank and Walter Grove, with Daniel Shen officiating. Attendants were Cora and Perry Shank, Justus Heatwole, and Amanda Yoder.

In 1909, Adam Baer of Hagerstown, Maryland purchased the Flory Farm.

School children in 1909 were Abram and Clara Mae Reiff, children of David and Emma Martin Reiff; Virginia and Clyde Kraus, children of Samuel and Amanda Kraus; Henry Brunk, son of Frank by his first wife, and Fannie and Christian Brunk, children of Frank Brunk and Martha Eby Brunk; Roy Hertzler; Jacob Shenk; Mayme and Susie Shenk, daughters of Daniel and Matilda Hilty Shenk; Luke, Pearl and Lois Eby, children of Amos and Elizabeth Metz Eby; Hugh and Emily Holloway; and LaFayette, son of Robert and Elizabeth Patrick Curtis.

=== 1910s ===
In 1910, J. Harvey Yoder researched the feasibility of a telephone system. A sewing circle was organized, meeting weekly during World War I to supply clothing and bedding for people in war-affected parts of Europe. The American Friends Service Committee supplied the cut cloth for them to sew.

In 1914, the Yoder Dairy at Oyster Point began selling milk.

=== 1920s ===
In 190, J. Harvey Yoder initiated and helped establish a farmers' market in downtown Newport News so that colony members could market their farm products.

=== 1930s ===
In 1931, Lewis Burkholder began dairy operations, later becoming the second-largest Peninsula distributor.

In 1933, J. Harvey Yoder worked with other dairy farmers to establish Colony Farms Cooperative Dairy, a mlik processing plant with retail delivery routes.

=== 1940s ===
In 1940, J. Harvey Yoder helped build a new farm market building.

In 1942, a Mennonite school was built a half-mile away from the first building.

In 1947, the colony commemorated its 50th anniversary with the book, "Fifty Years Building on the Warwick".

=== 1950s ===
Around 300 Mennonites lived here in the 1950s, all belonging to the Mennonite Church.

=== 1960s ===
The city of Newport News was taxing farms as commercial operations, forcing farmers in the Colony to search elsewhere for land. In 1968, Gene and Oliver Hertzler moved to Powhatan, Virginia to start a farm there. Of the 25 farms (including poultry and fruit farms), only ten remained in operation in 1960. The rise in land values and the growing cost of taxes and labor made farming difficult.

=== 2010s ===
In 2017, Quarterfield Farm, the last parcel of the original 1200-acre land, tended by Oliver and Anna Mae Hertzler for many years, was bulldozed, paved over, and ceased to exist as a farm.

== Organizations associated with the colony ==
- Mennowood Retirement Community
- Warwick River Christian Child Care
- Warwick River Christian School
- Warwick River Mennonite Church
- Warwick River Tide (a publication)
- Williamsburg Christian Retreat Center

== Businesses associated with the colony ==
- Beachy's Chimney Sweep (Colony Road, Denbigh)
- Burkholder Dairy (Denbigh, closed in the 1950s)
- Colony Farms Cooperative Dairy (Lucas Creek Road, Denbigh)
- The Gardener's Workshop (Miller Road, Denbigh)
- Mini-Acre Farm (Lucas Creek Road, Denbigh)
- Quarterfield Farms & Stables (Colony Road, Denbigh)
- Yoder Barn Theatre
- Yoder Dairy (Todd's Lane, Hampton)
- Yoder Frozen Foods, Inc. (339 35th St., Newport News)
- Yoder's Dairy Shoppe (Jefferson Avenue, Newport News)

== History ==
Before the Colony was settled by Mennonites, it was known as Denbigh Plantation, and in the early 1600s, as Mathews Manor. Mathews arrived on Turtle Island in 1622, and established Mathews Manor plantation at the mouth of the Warwick River. He led attacks on the Tanx (Weyanoke) Powhatan residents of the area and enslaved at least forty people on his plantation.

William Garrow Young (1814–1893) acquired Denbigh Plantation before the Civil War.

== See also ==
- Proud to be from Denbigh, Virginia(Facebook group)
