= Simon Reid Curtis House =

Historic house in Virginia, United States

- U.S. National Register of Historic Places
- Virginia Landmarks Register
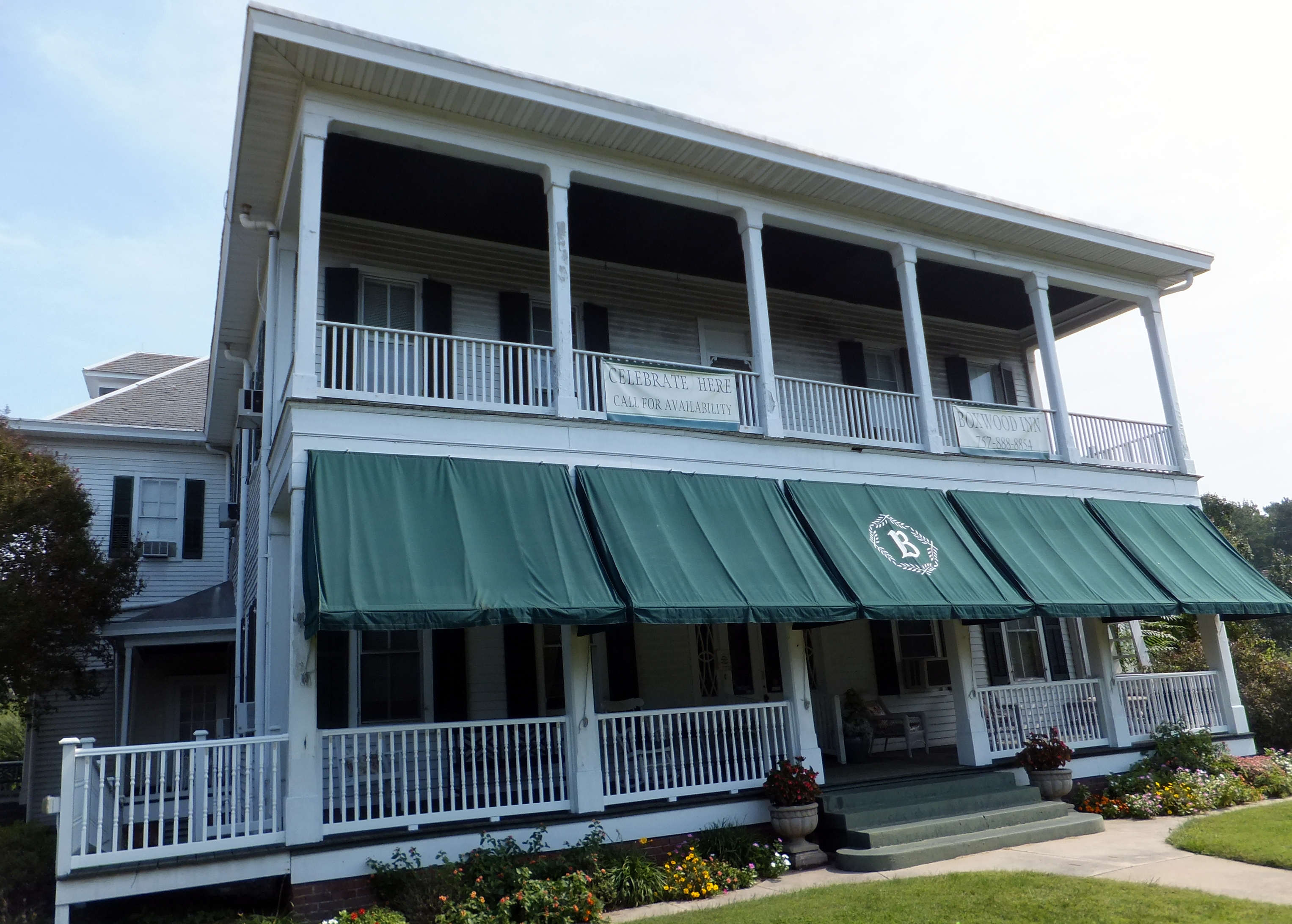
- Boxwood Inn, September 2012

- Location within Virginia Location within the United States
- Location: 10 Elmhurst St., Newport News, Virginia
- Coordinates: 37°11′45″N 76°34′20″W
- Area: 1.6 acres (0.65 ha)
- Built: 1897
- Architect: Wagner, Adolph
- Architectural style: Colonial Revival
- NRHP reference No.: 09000641
- VLR No.: 121-5031

Significant dates
- Added to NRHP: August 20, 2009
- Designated VLR: June 18, 2009

Simon Reid Curtis House, now known as the Boxwood Inn, is a historic home located in the Lee Hall neighborhood of Newport News, Virginia. It was built in 1897, and is a large, 2 1/2-story, Colonial Revival style frame combined store, post office, and dwelling. The building consists of two separate structures attached to form a T-shaped building with common architectural features. It was built by Simon Reid Curtis (1862–1949), a prominent businessman and land owner, who was an influential political leader in Warwick County, Virginia from the 1890s until his death in 1949. The Curtis family owned the house until 1996 when it was sold, renovated, and converted into a bed and breakfast.

It was listed on the National Register of Historic Places in 2009.
