= Ambrose Harmer =

Virginia landowner and politician

4th Speaker of the Virginia House of Burgesses
- In office 1646–1646
- Preceded by: Edmund Scarborough
- Succeeded by: Thomas Harwood

Personal details
- Died: c. 1663
- Spouse: Jane

Ambrose Harmer (died c.1647) was a Virginia landowner and politician. An opponent of Governor Sir John Harvey, he served on the Council 1639–41 under his successor, Sir Francis Wyatt. He served in the House of Burgesses 1645–46, and was Speaker in the 1646 session.
