= James M. Goggin =

James Monroe Goggin
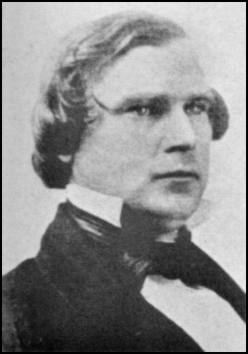
- James Monroe Goggin
- Born: October 23, 1820; Bedford County, Virginia
- Died: October 10, 1889 (aged 68); Austin, Texas
- Burial place: Austin, Texas
- Military career
- Branch: Army of the Republic of Texas; Confederate States Army
- Service years: 1842–1848; 1861–65

James Monroe Goggin (October 23, 1820 – October 10, 1889) was a Confederate States Army major and Assistant Adjutant General during the American Civil War (Civil War). He began his service as a major in the 32nd Virginia Volunteer Infantry Regiment until May 21, 1862. Although he was a staff officer for most of the rest of his war service, he commanded a brigade at the Battle of Cedar Creek on October 13, 1864. On December 4, 1864, he was appointed as a (special) brigadier general. The appointment was soon cancelled and he returned to his duties as a staff officer for Major General Joseph B. Kershaw for the remainder of the war.

== Early life and Texas ==
Goggin was born on October 23, 1820, in Bedford County, Virginia. He was married to Elizabeth Nelson Page.

Goggin entered the United States Military Academy at West Point, New York, in the Class of 1842 but left before graduating. After leaving West Point, Goggin relocated to Texas, where he joined the Army of the Republic of Texas as a first lieutenant. Goggin also began purchasing real estate in Waller County, Texas.

In 1848, Goggin moved to California where he took a job establishing mail routes. Goggin then moved to Memphis, Tennessee, where he began working as a cotton broker. He was engaged in this business until the beginning of the Civil War.

== Civil War service ==
In 1861, Goggin moved back to Virginia, entering the Confederate States Army on July 1, 1861, as a major in the 32nd Virginia Volunteer Infantry Regiment where he was assigned to lead a battalion. Goggin and the 32nd Virginia Infantry served under Maj. Gen. John B. Magruder in 1861 and into 1862 during the Peninsula Campaign. Goggin joined the First Corps, Army of Northern Virginia in April 1862, serving on the staff of Maj. Gen. Lafayette McLaws as his assistant adjutant general. He served in this capacity during all of the First Corps' engagements, in both the Army of Northern Virginia and the Army of Tennessee, until the spring of 1864. During the Battle of Fort Sanders in November 1863, Goggin carried a message from McLaws to Lt. Gen. James Longstreet, informing him that the attack was beginning to fail and it was futile to carry in on. When McLaws was replaced with Maj. Gen. Joseph B. Kershaw in May 1864, Goggin served as his assistant adjutant general as well. His service in this post was highly praised by Goggin's superiors.

On October 13, 1864, during the Battle of Cedar Creek in the Valley Campaigns of 1864, Goggin was given temporary command of Brig. Gen. James Conner's brigade. Conner had lost his left leg in combat earlier that day, and Kershaw assigned Goggin to lead his brigade in the battle at Cedar Creek. On December 4 he was appointed a "special" brigadier general, but this appointment was canceled soon afterwards.

Goggin returned to the staff of Kershaw in December 1864, once again as assistant adjutant general, and served until Goggin, Kershaw, and the rest of the staff were captured on April 6, 1865, at the Battle of Sayler's Creek during the Appomattox Campaign. They were paroled from that location on the same day.

== Postbellum ==
After the American Civil War ended in 1865, Goggin returned to Texas, initially in the state's Waller County, and then in Austin. Goggin died at the age of 68 on October 10, 1889, in Austin, Texas. He was buried in the city's Oakwood Cemetery.

== See also ==
- List of American Civil War Generals (Acting Confederate)
