= Humphrey Harwood =

Member of the House of Burgesses for Warwick County
- In office 1693 Serving with William Cary
- Preceded by: Robert Hubbard
- Succeeded by: William Roscow

Member of the House of Burgesses for Warwick County
- In office 1685-1686 Serving with Richard Whittaker
- Preceded by: Miles Cary II
- Succeeded by: Miles Cary II

Personal details
- Born: 1649 Queen Hith Plantation, Warwick County, Colony of Virginia
- Died: ca. 1700 Warwick County, Colony of Virginia
- Spouse: Anne Needler
- Children: Humphrey Jr., William, Thomas, John
- Parent(s): Anne and Thomas Harwood
- Relatives: William Jr.(grandson) Edward Harwood (Virginia politician)(great grandson)
- Occupation: planter, politician

Military service
- Branch/service: Virginia militia
- Rank: Major

Humphrey Harwood (ca. 1649 – 1700) was a soldier, landowner and politician in the Colony of Virginia.

== Early life ==
The son and heir of planter and former speaker of the House of Burgesses Thomas Harwood was a young boy when his father died, so William Whitaker became guardian for him and his two sisters. His father and great uncle William Harwood had both arrived in the earliest days of the Virginia colony, and became political leaders as well as major planters. Humphrey Harwood (for whom this man would name his heir) had arrived in the Virginia colony in 1621 to become "governor" of the Martin's Hundred plantation and survived the massacre of 1622 as well as served on the Governor's Council until he was recalled to England in 1635. In that year, still long before this boy's birth, his man's father sailed to Britain to present colonists' complaints against the colony's unpopular governor, Sir John Harvey, who was recalled. This boy and his two sisters were born to Thomas Harwood's second wife, Anne, and no record exists of any surviving children of their father and his first wife, Grace, who had emigrated to the colony with her husband. Ann was likely a daughter or granddaughter of William Peirce who had emigrated to the colony in 1609, since this boy's sister (also Grace) inherited from Capt. Thomas Peirce in 1665 and after her death her former husband Thomas Iken lived at Capt. William Peirce's dwellinghouse. In any event, his widowed mother Ann remarried within a year, to a local physician, Dr. Henry Blagrave, who likely oversaw this boy's education, although his guardian protected the boy's inheritance by noting that Ann deeded her share of Thomas Harwood's estate to these three children before her remarriage.

== Career ==
Humphrey Harwood inherited about 3644 acres, which he formally claimed in 1670 after reaching legal age, and then cultivated using enslaved labor. In January 1677, following the suppression of Bacon's Rebellion, Harwood confiscated John Lucas's goods and livestock.

Although Harwood never rose to the political heights of his father and great uncle, Harwood long served as one of the justices of the peace for Warwick County (which also collectively governed the county in that era). He also served as the county sheriff in 1691. Warwick County voters twice elected Harwood as one of the burgesses representing the county in the House of Burgesses, but his second election was contested. Although fellow burgesses recognized Harwood as the winner and seated him over William Roscow to serve alongside William Cary in 1693, at the next election, voters elected Roscow. Harwood's last public acts were as a judge for a trial of pirates at Elizabeth City in May 1700, as well as taking a list of tithables in upper Mulberry Island Parish that June. He was not mentioned in the quitrent roll of 1704.

== Personal life and legacy ==
Humphrey Harwood married Ann Needler, daughter of John Needler, and in 1687 he and William Cary were executors of John Needler's estate.
