= Lee Hall, Virginia =

Coordinates: 37°11′31″N 76°34′18″W

- Neighborhood
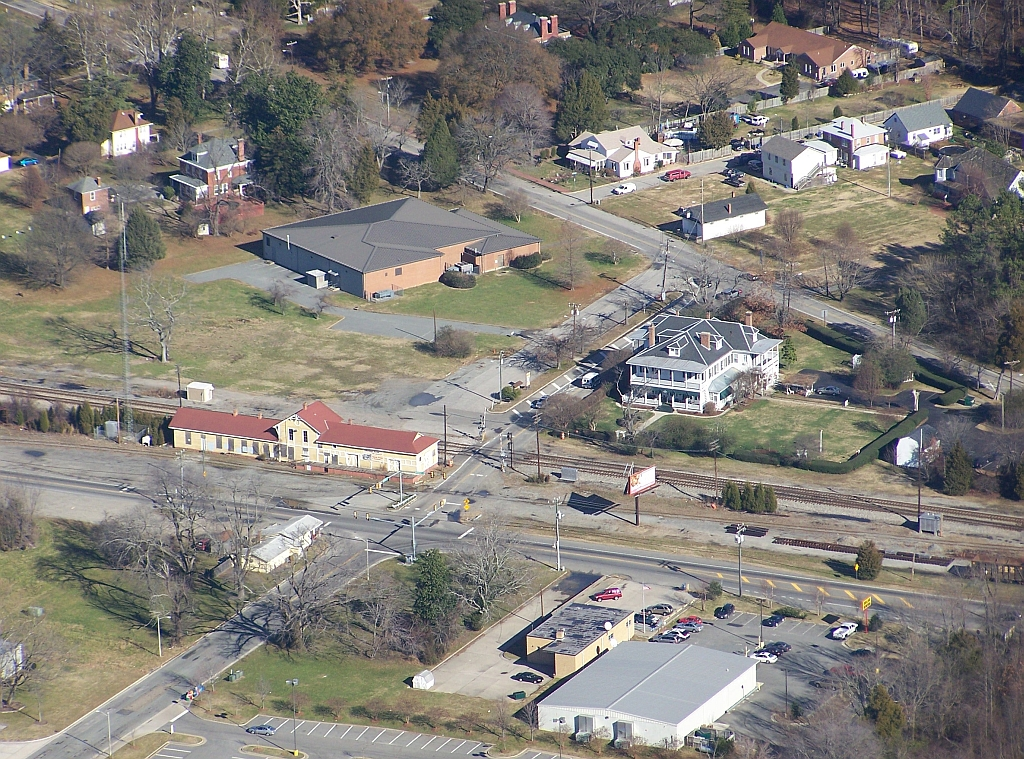
- Lee Hall in December 2007

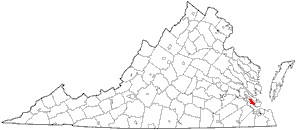
- Location in the State of Virginia
- Country: United States
- State: Virginia
- Established: 1881

Lee Hall is a community located in the extreme northern portion of the independent city of Newport News in the Commonwealth of Virginia in the United States.

== History ==
Lee Hall, located in the former Warwick County, was named for nearby Lee Hall Mansion which was built in 1859 as the home of Richard Decatur Lee, a prominent local farmer who was not directly related to the famous Confederate General Robert E. Lee. The mansion was used as headquarters for Confederate generals Joseph E. Johnston and John B. Magruder during the Peninsula Campaign of the American Civil War in 1862. Nearby is Endview Plantation, a 238-year-old house. Endview was used as a hospital during the Civil War and as a campground during the Revolutionary War, the War of 1812 and the Civil War.

Lee Hall Depot was a railroad station on the Peninsula Extension of the Chesapeake and Ohio Railway (C&O), which was built through the area of Warwick County in 1881 to reach the new coal export facilities at Newport News on the port of Hampton Roads. On October 19, 1881, the first passenger train from Newport News took local residents and national officials to the Cornwallis Surrender Centennial Celebration at Yorktown on temporary tracks which were laid from Lee Hall Depot. The Boxwood Inn was built in 1897.

Lee Hall Depot became a very busy railroad station after the establishment nearby of Fort Eustis (originally named Camp Abraham Eustis) in 1918, with freight and heavy troop movements. the busy activity resumed during World War II. It was expanded to accommodate this role. East of Lee Hall, a rail spur leads to the base, where the Fort Eustis Military Railroad operated.

With the coming of the automobile as a common form of travel in the early 20th century, attention was directed to improving roads. As part of the Good Roads Movement, the new road which became U.S. Route 60 was routed from Williamsburg through Grove, bridging Skiffe's Creek as it entered Warwick County to reach Lee Hall. This routing was chosen rather than following a competing route via Halstead's Point in York County (now on the base of the US Naval Weapons Station Yorktown just northeast of the gate on VA-143).

Earlier, the east–west road which became U.S. 60 was State Route 9. SR 9 was renumbered as State Route 39 in 1923, and became U.S. 60 in the mid-1920s when it was routed through Grove. A large ceremony hosted by Warwick County treasurer and civic leader Simon Curtis was held at the Lee Hall Depot in 1924 to celebrate the completion of first hard-surfaced roadway (concrete) between Newport News and Williamsburg.

Two-laned U.S. 60 continues to form the main thoroughfare through the largely residential and neighborhood business section of Grove and Lee Hall, paralleling four-laned State Route 143 and Interstate 64. The village portion of Lee Hall is connected to I-64 via State Route 238 (Yorktown Road).

Although Warwick County became a city in 1952 and then was consolidated with Newport News in 1958, in the half century since, the Lee Hall area has retained a rural atmosphere, partially due to the proximity of the expansive Newport News Park and Newport News Reservoir along the former Warwick River and nearby Skiffe's Creek.

The 26th Balloon Company of the US Army Air Corps had a training school at Lee Hall at least during the summer of 1920 training soldiers for deployment to central and South America service.

=== Lee Hall preservation ===
In the 21st century, Lee Hall Depot (no longer in use) is the only surviving C&O structure of its type on the Lower Peninsula. It is the only survivor among five stations which were located in Warwick County, the others formerly located at Oriana, Oyster Point, Morrison, and Newport News. The historic 2-story depot was relocated 165 feet to the north of the busy CSX Transportation railroad tracks in 2009, and reopened as a museum in 2021. The adjacent historic area as has been restored and developed as Lee Hall Village. Across the street from the Depot, the Boxwood Inn, a bed and breakfast establishment in an 1896 house, is open and available for overnight visitors and some meals. The city's tourism agency operates several other attractions at Lee Hall Mansion and Endview Plantation, as well as nearby civil war historical sites.

== Transportation ==
The Lee Hall community is served by exit 247 of Interstate 64. About 1 block from the historic railroad station, U.S. Route 60 and State Route 238 intersect.

Lee Hall is served by both Hampton Roads Transit (HRT) and Williamsburg Area Transit Authority (WATA).

- HRT operates Route 108 and Route 116 between Patrick Henry Mall and Warwick Blvd (US 60) @ Elmhurst St about every 60 minutes
- WATA operates the Grey Line into Lee Hall hourly, with 30 minute service during peak weekday hours.
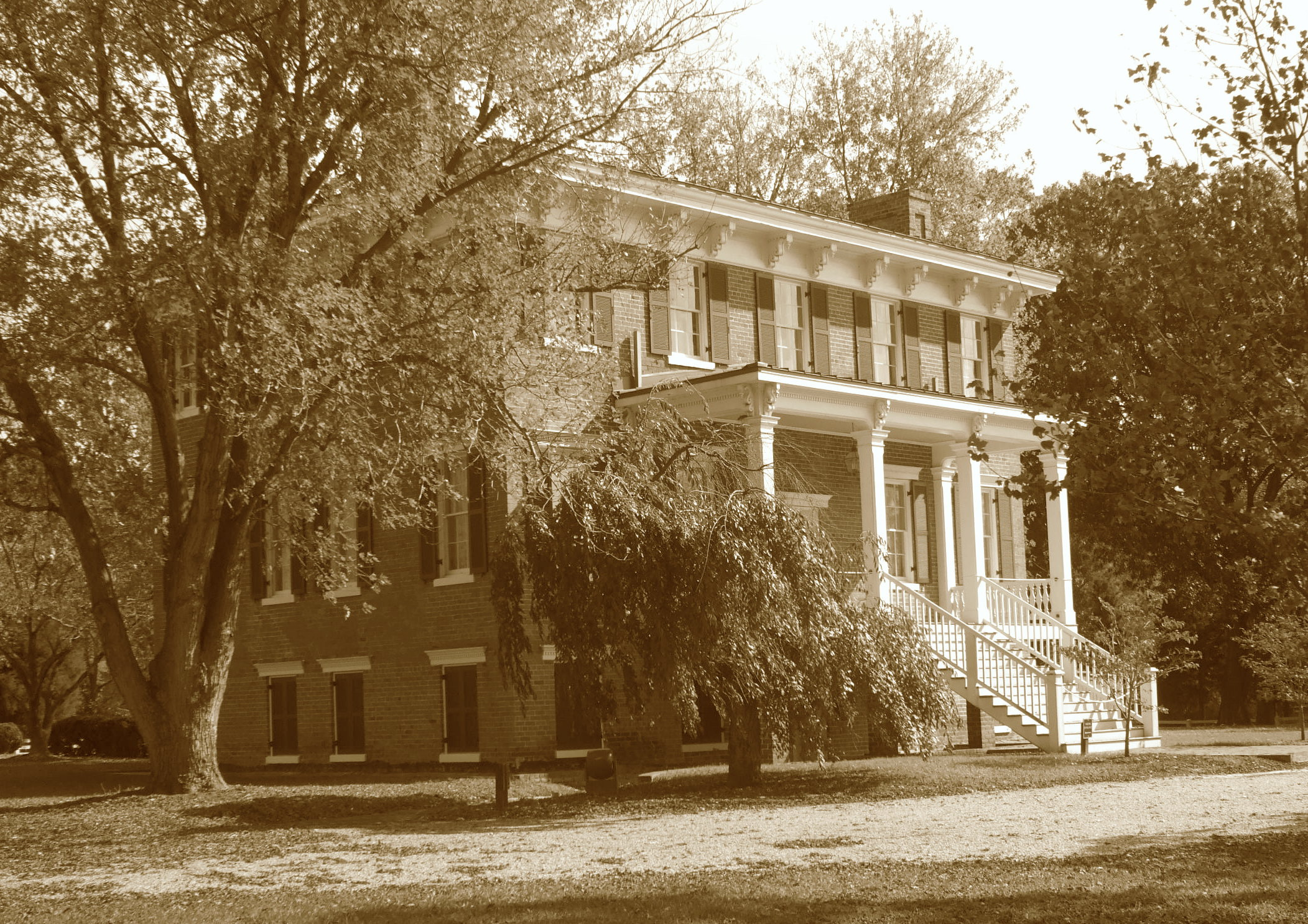
Lee Hall Mansion.

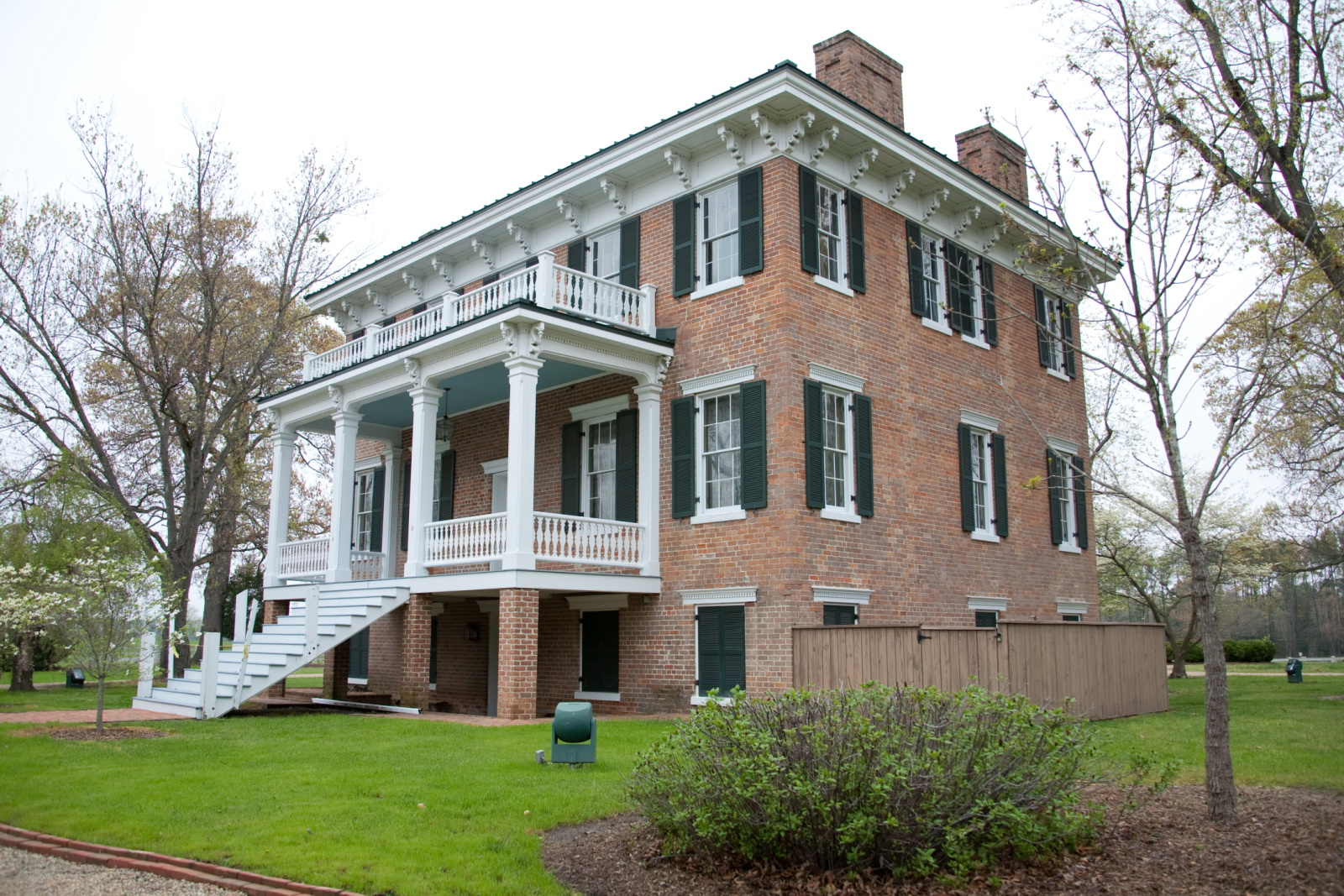
Lee Hall Mansion.

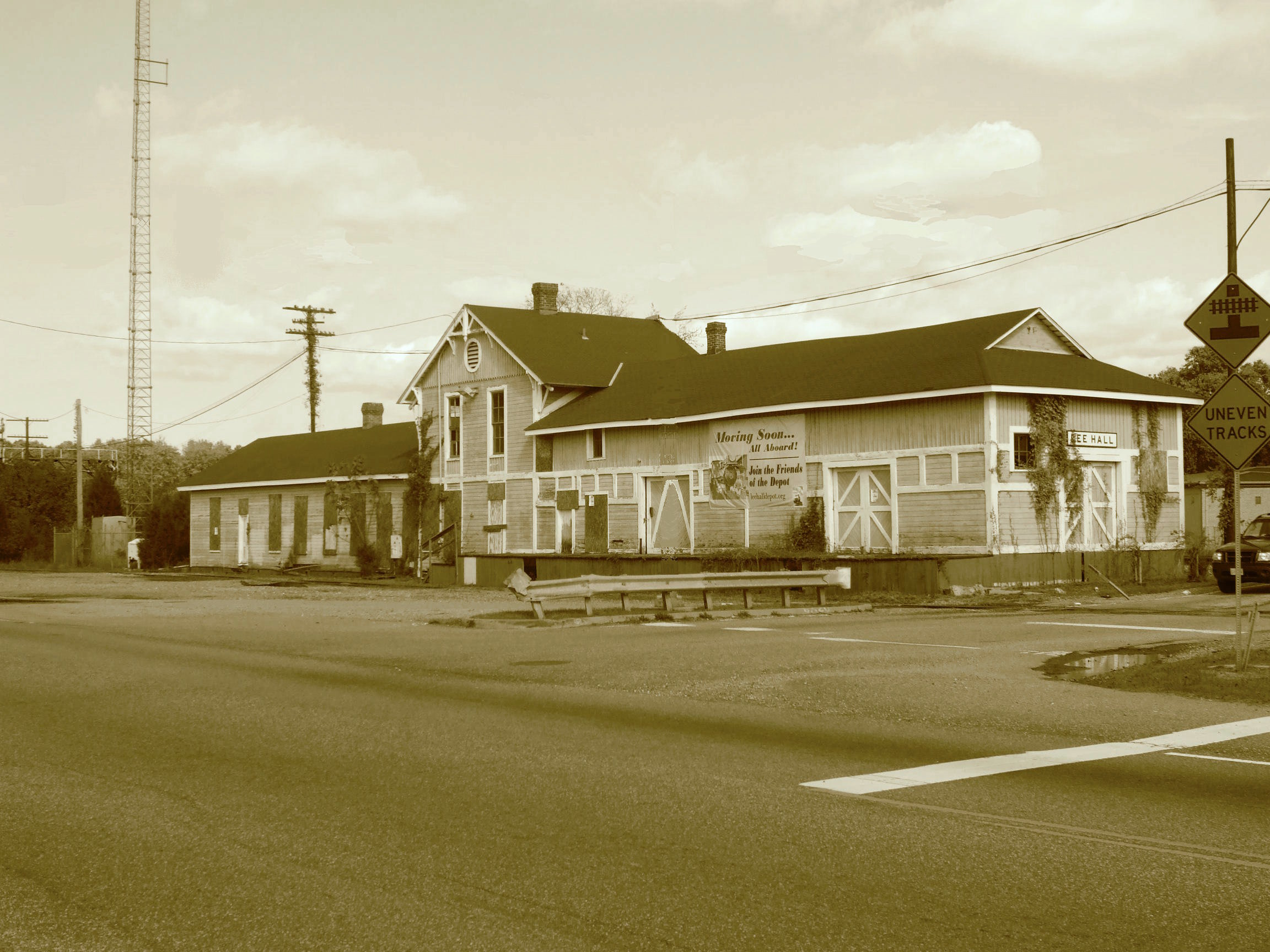
C&O Depot at Lee Hall, VA.

== See also ==
- Newport News Department of Parks, Recreation and Tourism
- Historic Triangle
- Peninsula Campaign
- Collis P. Huntington
