= 32nd Virginia Infantry Regiment =

- Flag of Virginia, 1861
- Active: May 1861 – April 1865
- Disbanded: April 1865
- Country: Confederacy
- Allegiance: Confederate States of America
- Branch: Confederate States Army
- Type: Infantry
- Engagements: Peninsula Campaign; Battle of Seven Pines; Seven Days' Battles; Second Battle of Bull Run; Battle of Sharpsburg; Battle of Fredericksburg; Siege of Suffolk; Battle of Cold Harbor; Siege of Petersburg; Battle of Five Forks; Battle of Sailor's Creek; Appomattox Campaign

Commanders
- Notable commanders: Colonel Benjamin S. Ewell

The 32nd Virginia Infantry Regiment was an infantry regiment raised in Virginia for service in the Confederate States Army during the American Civil War. It fought mostly with the Army of Northern Virginia.

The 32nd Virginia was formed in May, 1861, by consolidating Montague's and Goggin's Infantry Battalions. Its members were from Hampton and Williamsburg and the counties of Warwick, James City, and York. Three companies were accepted into service as artillery and were transferred to the 1st Virginia Artillery. After its reorganization in May, 1862, the unit operated with only seven companies.

The field officers were Colonels Benjamin S. Ewell and Edgar Burwell Montague; Lieutenant Colonels John B. Cary and William Royall Willis; and Majors James M. Goggin, Baker P. Lee, Jr., and Jefferson Sinclair.

== Engagements ==
At the Battle of Williamsburg two companies fought under General Pryor, then the regiment was attached to General Semmes' and Corse's Brigade. It participated in many conflicts from the Seven Days' Battles to Fredricksburg, moved with Longstreet to Suffolk, and later served in the Department of Richmond and in North Carolina. Returning to Virginia it was active at Drewry's Bluff and Cold Harbor, took its place in the Petersburg trenches north and south of the James River, they saw action on the Chickahominy (May 1864), at Cold Harbor (June), on the Petersburg Campaign (to April 1865), and ended the war at Appomattox.

The regiment reported 1 wounded at Savage's Station, had 2 killed and 4 wounded at Malvern Hill, and sustained 72 casualties of the 158 engaged at Sharpsburg. Some were captured at Sayler's Creek, and 5 officers and 42 men were included in the surrender.

Engagement Summary
Engagement	Date	Division	Brigade	Commander
Battle of Williamsburg	May 5, 1862	MG James Longstreet, Second Division	BG Roger A. Pryor, Fifth Brigade	(detachment of two companies) Col Benjamin S. Ewell? (Ewell left 32nd regiment to join general staff of Joseph E. Johnston after this battle.)
Battle of Seven Pines	May 31 and June 1, 1862	BG Richard H. Anderson, Longstreet's Division	BG Roger A. Pryor, Pryor's Brigade	Ltc William R. Willis (while Colonel Montague was stricken with typhoid)
Seven Days' Battles, Battle of Malvern Hill, Battle of Savage's Station	June 25 to July 1, 1862	MG Lafayette McLaws, McLaws' Division	BG Paul J. Semmes, First Brigade	Ltc William R. Willis (while Colonel Montague was stricken with typhoid)
Battle of Antietam	September 17, 1862	MG Lafayette McLaws, McLaws' Division	BG Paul J. Semmes, First Brigade	Col Edgar B. Montague
Battle of Fredericksburg	December 11–15, 1862	MG George E. Pickett, Pickett's Division	BG Montgomery Dent Corse, Corse's Brigade	Col Edgar B. Montague
Siege of Suffolk	April 11 to May 4, 1863	MG George E. Pickett, Pickett's Division	BG Montgomery Dent Corse, Corse's Brigade	Col Edgar B. Montague
Battle of Spotsylvania Court House	May 9–21, 1864	MG George E. Pickett, Pickett's Division	BG Montgomery Dent Corse, Corse's Brigade	Col Edgar B. Montague
Battle of Cold Harbor	May 31–June 12, 1864	MG George E. Pickett, Pickett's Division	BG Montgomery Dent Corse, Corse's Brigade	Col Edgar B. Montague
Battle of Five Forks	April 1, 1865	MG George E. Pickett, Pickett's Division	BG Montgomery Dent Corse, Corse's Brigade	Ltc William R. Willis (Col Montague left regiment in Dec 1864 on sick leave.)
Siege of Petersburg	June 9, 1864 - March 25, 1865	MG George E. Pickett, Pickett's Division	BG Montgomery Dent Corse, Corse's Brigade	?
Appomattox Campaign, Battle of Sailor's Creek	March 29 to April 9, 1865	MG George E. Pickett, Pickett's Division	BG Montgomery Dent Corse (captured April 6), Col Arthur Herbert, Corse's Brigade	Cpt Samuel W. Armistead

== Constituent Units ==
32nd originally consisted of just two companies in 1859, the Wythe Rifles of Hampton and the Williamsburg Junior Guard. Colonel Benjamin S. Ewell grew the regiment into five infantry and four artillery companies. The artillery companies were eventually reassigned. On May 22, 1862, Edgar Burwell Montague was elected Colonel, Captain William Royall Willis of the Wythe Rifles (Co. A) was promoted to Lieutenant Colonel, and the regiment was reorganized as follows:

=== Wythe Rifles ===
Company A.

=== Williamsburg Junior Guard ===
Company C.

=== Hampton Greys ===
Company E.

=== Nelson Guards ===
Company F.

=== Warwick Beauregards ===
Company H (2nd). Volunteer unit under Capt. (Dr.) Humphrey Harwood Curtis, Jr., three lieutenants, four sergeants, four corporals, 67 privates and a drummer boy. Organized at Endview Plantation in Warwick County, Virginia.

=== York Rangers ===
Company I (2nd).

Below is a roll call (date unknown):

- Capt. - Jefferson Sinclair
- 1st Lieut. -Wm. J. Stores
- 2nd Lieut. - Robert Willis
- 3rd Lieut. - Henry Sinclair (Brother to Jefferson)

Privates:

- Amory, John
- Ayers, Henry
- Barrow, Albert (Captured in Yorktown, sent to Fort Delaware)
- Boutwell, Wm
- Banting, Joseph
- Bassett, W.E.
- Briggs, Benj.
- Burt, Wm.
- Buchanan, Elijah
- Bunting, Wirt
- Cox, G.B.
- Cox, Elias
- Cox, George
- Carmines, Kenneth
- Cain, Thomas
- Candy, Thomas
- Cratzer, Edgar
- Crockett, Addison
- Davis, Charles
- Dawson, Humphrey
- Dawson, Robert
- Elliott, Seaton
- Foster, Elijah
- Firth, Thomas
- Forrest, Robert
- Forsythe, Thomas
- Freeman, Henry
- Glover, Charles
- Goffigan, W.E.
- Gordon, J.
- Gordon, Wm.
- Hansford, Louis
- Haskins, John Robert (Musician, Drummer, of the Cumberland County Va. Haskins's)
- Haskins, William Creed (older brother of John Robert Haskins)
- Hopkins, George
- Hopkins, Frank
- Halls, Jim
- Halloway, Wm. (Captured at Yorktown. Sent to Fort Delaware)
- Howard, J.T.
- Herbert, Thomas
- Hugett, J.
- Hunt, Benj.
- Hunt, Wm.
- Insley, Jas.
- Insley, Wm.
- Moreland, Alphonso
- Moreland, Darius
- Moore, E.B.
- Moore, Wm.
- Moore, Merrett
- Mason, George
- Patrick, Robert
- Patrick, Wm.
- Payne, Reiley
- Peek, E.K.
- Poole, Alex
- Poole, Robert
- Presson, Robert
- Presson, John
- Quimby, Wm.
- Rowe, Benj.
- Sheilds, Arthur
- Treen, Wm.
- Traynam, W.H.
- Vernam, Henry
- Vernam, Wm.
- Vixon, Wm.
- Watson, George
- White, J.
- White, Robert
- White, Wise
- Williams, Charles
- Wynne, Frank Lee
- Wynne, Edmund Thomas
- Wynne, Richard Henry

=== Lee Guards ===
Company K (2nd).

== See also ==
- List of Virginia Civil War units
- Warwick Beauregards
