= William Harwood (burgess) =

Virginia landowner and politician

Member of the House of Burgesses for Warwick County, Colony of Virginia
- In office 1728–1734 Serving with William Roscow
- Preceded by: William Cole
- Succeeded by: Thomas Haynes
- In office 1710–1714 Serving with William Cary, Miles Willis
- Preceded by: Miles Cary
- Succeeded by: William Cole

Personal details
- Born: Warwick County, Colony of Virginia
- Died: June 2, 1737 Warwick County, Colony of Virginia
- Spouse: Elizabeth
- Children: Humphrey, William Jr., Thomas, Mathew, Ann
- Parent(s): Humphrey Harwood, Ann Needler
- Relatives: Thomas Harwood (grandfather);
- Occupation: planter, politician

William Harwood (died June 2, 1737) was a landowner and politician in the Colony of Virginia who thrice represented Warwick County in the House of Burgesses.

== Early and family life ==
One of the sons of Ann Needler and her planter and burgess husband Humphrey Harwood. He was likely named for his great-uncle William Harwood who had governed Martin's Hundred and served on the colony's governor's council as well as a burgess. Their father had apparently died by 1704, and this man outlived his brothers Humphrey (d. by 1713) and Thomas (d. by 1729). Another brother, John Harwood, paid taxes on 750 acres in Warwick County in 1704 and received a government subsidy for "taking up Jack an Indian boy" a decade later. Although he held no public offices and no probate record for him remains, Capt. John Harwood may be the mariner who sailed between Virginia, New England and London, including on the Sea Nymph that docked on the York River in 1739.

== Career ==
This William Harwood paid taxes on 625 acres in Warwick County in 1704, and in 1717 used a power of attorney from his London-based scrivener cousin, Needler Webb. In 1704, his elder brother Humphrey paid taxes on 400 acres in Warwick County (likely the Mulberry Island plantation called the "Beech" which their rather had given him in 1696) and by 1705 had begun serving on the local parish's vestry as well as one of the local justices of the peace. Although Humphrey Harwood Jr. in 1710 had accepted appointment as Warwick's sheriff, by 1713 he had died and this man was appointed executor of his estate. About a month before this man's death two decades later, he (or his namesake son William Harwood, Jr.) was also appointed administrator of the estate of his mariner son Thomas Harwell (to whom he had given a half acre lot in Yorktown) as well as became guardian of Thomas' children (this man's grandchildren) Elizabeth and Pate. Since the guardianship extended past this man's death, William Jr. appears to have completed the duty. Both men presumably operated the plantations using enslaved labor.

Like his father (and later his namesake son), Harwood represented Warwick County several times in the House of Burgesses, beginning in 1710 and winning re-election in 1712 (both times alongside fellow planter William Cary), then served alongside William Roscoe beginning in 1728.

== Personal life ==
His wife Elizabeth bore four sons and a daughter (Humphrey, William Jr., Thomas, Matthew and Ann).

== Death and legacy ==
Harwood died after falling from a horse on June 2, 1737. Within a decade, his son William Jr. continued the family's planter and political traditions by winning election (and multiple re-elections) to the House of Burgesses (as well as to all the Virginia Revolutionary conventions), becoming the longest-serving of all the men of that name. He also established Endview Plantation, now a historic house museum and park operated by the city of Newport News, which greatly expanded and absorbed Warwick County in the 1950s.
