= William Harwood, Jr. =

Virginia soldier, landowner and politician

William Harwood

Member of the Virginia House of Delegates for Warwick County, Colony of Virginia
- In office 1776 Serving with Richard Cary
- Preceded by: position created
- Succeeded by: Francis Leigh

Member of the House of Burgesses for Warwick County, Colony of Virginia
- In office 1742-1776 Serving with John Langhorne, William Digges, William Langhorne
- Preceded by: William Roscow
- Succeeded by: position abolished

Personal details
- Born: Warwick County, Colony of Virginia
- Died: June 2, 1737 Warwick County, Colony of Virginia
- Spouse: Mary
- Children: William, Edward and 4 daughters
- Parent(s): William Harwood (burgess), Elizabeth
- Relatives: Humphrey Harwood(grandfather), Thomas Harwood (great-grandfather);
- Occupation: planter, politician

William Harwood (d. Sept. 1780) was a militia colonel, landowner and politician in the Colony of Virginia. He represented Warwick County in the House of Burgesses for more than three decades (mostly with his neighbor William Digges) beginning in 1752), as well as during all five Virginia Revolutionary Conventions (although no record actually exists of his presence during the 2nd and 3rd conventions) and in the first session of the Virginia House of Delegates. Harwood also established Endview Plantation, which became his home and later that of his second son Edward Harwood and grandson (through his eldest son William who moved to Kentucky) Big Humphrey Harwood. Acquired by the City of Newport News in 1995, it is now operated as a house museum focusing on the American Civil War, as well as a park.

Complicating matters, although Harwood had died before Virginia's tax census of 1787, at least three men of the same name but unclear relationship paid taxes in that census. The man living in Warwick County was almost certainly his son who soon moved to Kentucky. William Harwood then owned nine enslaved adults, as well as a dozen enslaved teenagers, five horses and 50 cattle, as well as land (or at least livestock) in Lincoln County (which became Kentucky) and relatively nearby Charles City County, Virginia. William B. Harwood also owned an adult slave and three enslaved teenagers (as well as 2 horses and 2 cattle) in Charles City County, and probably another William Harwood owned two adult slaves adults and four teenagers (as well as 5 horses) in Henrico County, Virginia. Other men of the Harwood family (but distant relations) had owned land near Weyanoke in Charles City County since 1665;; Joseph Harwood, Samuel Harwood and Samuel Harwood, Jr. had represented Charles City County in the House of Burgesses at various times in the 18th century, and Major Samuel Harwood represented Charles City County in one of the revolutionary conventions before his death in 1778.
