= Warwick Beauregards =

Civil war volunteer military unit from Warwick County, Virginia, May 1861 - April 1865

- Company H, 32nd Regiment Virginia Volunteers
- Flag of Virginia, 1861
- Active: May 1861 - April 1865
- Disbanded: 1865
- Country: Confederacy
- Allegiance: Confederate States of America
- Branch: Confederate States Army
- Type: Infantry / Militia
- Size: 80 volunteers
- Part of: 32nd Virginia Infantry Regiment
- Garrison/HQ: Endview Plantation
- Engagements: American Civil War: Dam Number One; Battle of Williamsburg; Battle of Seven Pines; Battle of Savage's Station; Battle of Malvern Hill; Battle of Antietam (Sharpsburg); Battle of Fredericksburg; Bermuda Hundred campaign (Howlett Line); Battle of Yellow Tavern (Brook Turnpike); Battle of Cold Harbor; Fort Harrison; Battle of Sailor's Creek; Battle of Five Forks / Battle of Appomattox Court House

Commanders
- Notable commanders: Capt. Humphrey Harwood Curtis Jr.

The Warwick Beauregards was a volunteer infantry company of 80 members in the Confederate States Army organized by Dr. (Capt.) Humphrey Harwood Curtis Jr. of Endview Plantation in May 1861.

The unit was mustered by Col. Benjamin Stoddert Ewell to active duty on May 27, 1861. It became Company H of the 32nd Regiment Virginia Volunteers on July 1, 1861. It participated in 13 battles throughout the American Civil War. Only 15 members remained by the end of the War, the rest being killed, captured, succumbed by disease, integrated to other units, or returned home.

== Engagements ==
- Dam Number One
- Battle of Williamsburg (casualties included W. Coleman, Taylor Gambol)
- Battle of Seven Pines
- Battle of Savage's Station
- Battle of Malvern Hill (casualties included William H. Norris)
- Battle of Antietam (Sharpsburg) (casualties included Martin Walker)
- Battle of Fredericksburg
- Bermuda Hundred campaign (Howlett Line)
- Battle of Yellow Tavern (Brook Turnpike Rd)
- Battle of Cold Harbor (Henry Epling captured. casualties included William B. Cook and Thomas K. Marrow.)
- Fort Harrison
- Battle of Sailor's Creek (H.W. Lee, William Lewelling, John Lewelling, E.C. Patrick, D.C. Patrick, T.C. Patrick, James Powell and Thomas Harwood captured. Lt. Thomas Curtis killed.)
- Battle of Five Forks / Battle of Appomattox Court House ( William C. Miner, Samuel H. Miner, William H. Davis, J. Haynes, Jason H. T. Hawley, William E. Hawley, Franklin P. Mallicote, Gowan L. Moore, Jonah L. Tabb captured at Five Forks. 1st Sgt Sylvanus Mallicott, R. T. Mallicote, Thomas M. Harwood recorded at Appomattox surrender.)

== Roster ==
The original unit included Curtis as captain, three lieutenants, four sergeants, four corporals, 67 privates and a drummer boy. Some of the noted members included:

- Dr. Humphrey Harwood Curtis Jr. served as captain from May 27, 1861 until May 1, 1862.
- William G. Young of Denbigh Plantation was 1st Lt from May 27, 1861 till May 4, 1862. He was assigned to John B. Magruder's quartermaster dept.
- The elder Edmond Curtis was 3rd Cpl May 27, 1861 until 1 May 1862. He was elected captain May 1, 1862, but died of disease before the unit left the Peninsula.
- John Archibald Green was elected captain after the Battle of Williamsburg at age 19, and served as captain until he was captured at the Battle of Five Forks on October 6, 1865.
- William S. Curtis was 1st Lt. from May 27, 1861 to May 4, 1862.
- Thomas G. Curtis served as 2nd lieutenant. He was killed at the Battle of Sailor's Creek on Apr 6th, 1865.
- William C Miner was Sgt from May 27, 1861, 1 Sgt in 1862, and 1st Lt in 1863.
- Other Lieutenants included Virginius (B) W. Nash.
- Sergeants included Sylavanus H. Mallicote, Thomas M. Harwood, Thomas W. Lee, Humprhrey W. Lee
- Corporals included Samuel G. Curtis, William B. Cook, S William H. Curtis, Jason H. T. Hawley, Jonah Lackonby, Samuel H. Miner., and William M. Patrick.
- Pvt. James F. Hopkins was in charge of building what would come to be called Fort Crafford on Mulberry Island.
- Ralph W. Copeland, 14, was the drummer boy.

== Warwick County monument ==
A monument to the Warwick Beauregards was dedicated on May 27, 1909, in front of the Warwick County Courthouse. In August 2020, the City of Newport News voted to remove the monument, and it was removed shortly thereafter.

== See also ==
- Endview Plantation
- Warwick County, Virginia
- Warwick County Courthouses
