= Skiffe's Creek =

Coordinates: 37°12′27″N 76°35′28″W

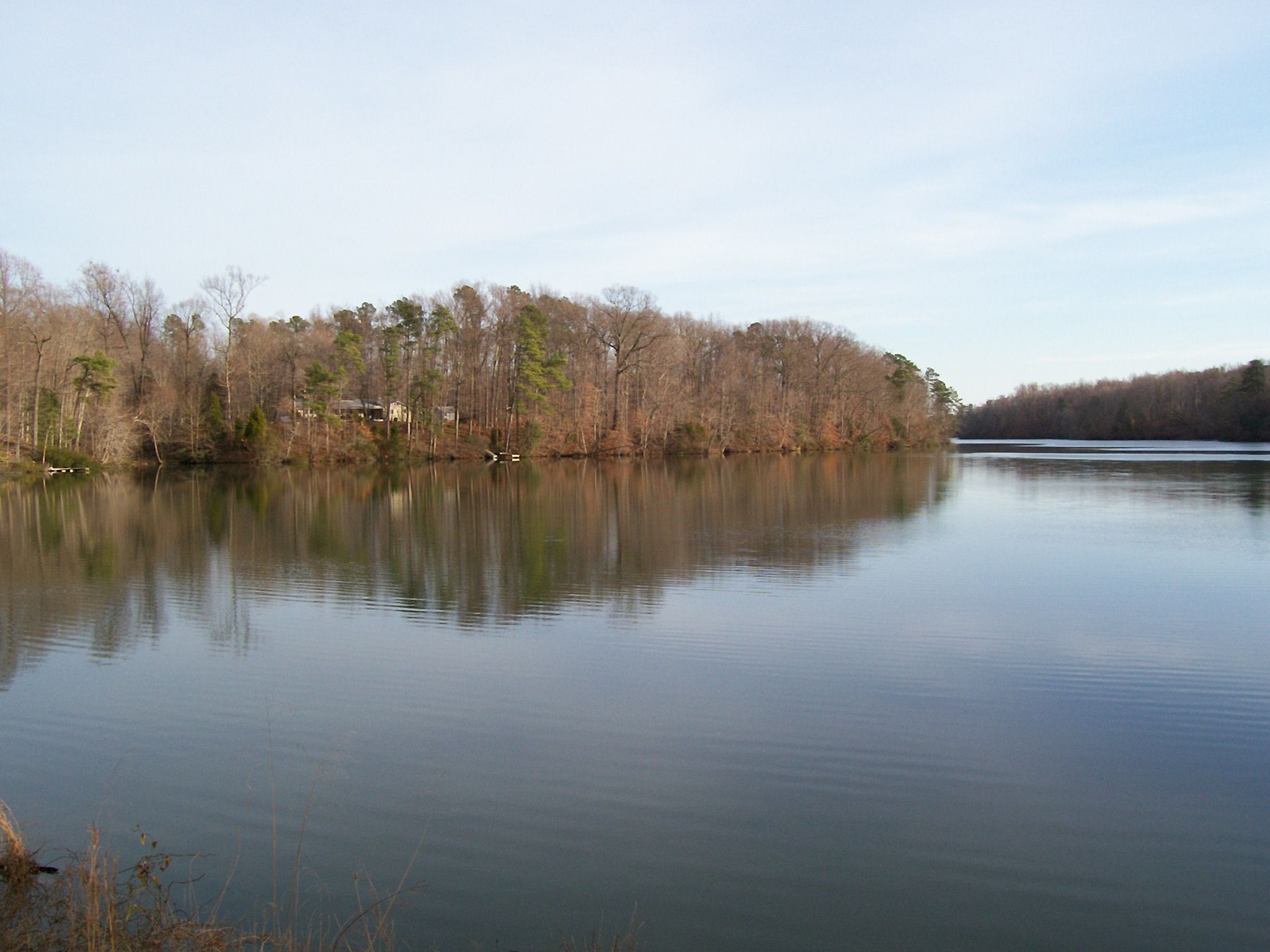
Skiffe's Creek Reservoir of the Newport News Waterworks, located at border of James City County and the City of Newport News, Virginia

Skiffe's Creek is located in James City County and the independent city of Newport News in the Virginia Peninsula area of the Hampton Roads region of southeastern Virginia in the United States. It is a tributary of the James River.

== Early history 17th-19th centuries ==
In the early 17th century, Skiffe's Creek bordered Martin's Hundred, a proprietary settlement dating to 1618 in the British Colony of Virginia. The creek formed one of the borders between James City Shire and Warwick Shire when they were formed in 1634 by the House of Burgesses as directed by King Charles I. They were two of the eight original shires of Virginia.

For over 300 years, Skiffe's Creek was part of the boundary between James City County and Warwick County. Early speaker of the House of Burgesses Thomas Harwood established the Queen Hith plantation on both sides of Skiffe's Creek, and his descendants for generations kept it as their family seat, until great-great-grandson William Harwood finished Endview Plantation in 1769, and moved his family there. Upon the consolidation of Warwick County into the city of Newport News in 1958, both plantations became part of the city, which acquiredthe Endview plantation in 1995 and how operates it and two other house museums. The creek continues to be the dividing line between the two political subdivisions of Virginia.

In 1881, Skiffe's Creek was bridged by a trestle of the new Peninsula Subdivision. Collis P. Huntington led the development of the Chesapeake and Ohio Railway through the new Church Hill Tunnel and down the Virginia Peninsula through Williamsburg where it finally reached coal piers located on the harbor Hampton Roads, the East Coast of the United States' largest ice-free port. During the ten years from 1878 to 1888, C&O's coal resources began to be developed and shipped eastward. Coal became a staple of the C&O's business at that time and still does over 125 years later under successor CSX Transportation.

The Lee Hall depot, two miles east of the Skiffe's Creek crossing, was built in 1881–82, and was later expanded. The station served tens of thousands of soldiers based at Fort Eustis during World War I and World War II.

== Skiffe's Creek Reservoir ==
Skiffe's Creek Reservoir is a portion of the Newport News Waterworks, a regional water provider, owned and operated by the City of Newport News that serves over 400,000 people in the cities of Hampton, Newport News, Poquoson, and portions of York and James City County.

The regional water system, which initially included an impingement of the Warwick River in western Warwick County, was begun as a project of Collis P. Huntington as part of the development of the lower peninsula with the Chesapeake and Ohio Railway, the coal piers on the harbor of Hampton Roads, and a massive shipyard which were the major sources of industrial growth which helped establish Newport News as an independent city in 1896.

== 19th-21st centuries ==
In the early 20th century, Skiffe's Creek was bridged by U.S. Route 60. Today, most through traffic uses the Interstate 64 or State Route 143. Route 60 primarily links local traffic between the Grove community of southeastern James City County and the Lee Hall community of Newport News. Both communities are attempting to retain their rural appearance even as their respective localities are both being developed. Additionally, a small portion of the expansive Naval Weapons Station Yorktown is in the Skiffe's Creek watershed.

In the late 20th century, the rural two story frame depot at Lee Hall was saved from demolition by rail enthusiast and rail preservationists. In June 2007, a CSX hopper train derailed at the Skiffe's Creek Trestle, with no injuries.

== See also ==
- List of rivers of Virginia
