= First Denbigh Parish Church Archeological Site =

Historic church in Virginia, United States

- U.S. National Register of Historic Places
- Virginia Landmarks Register
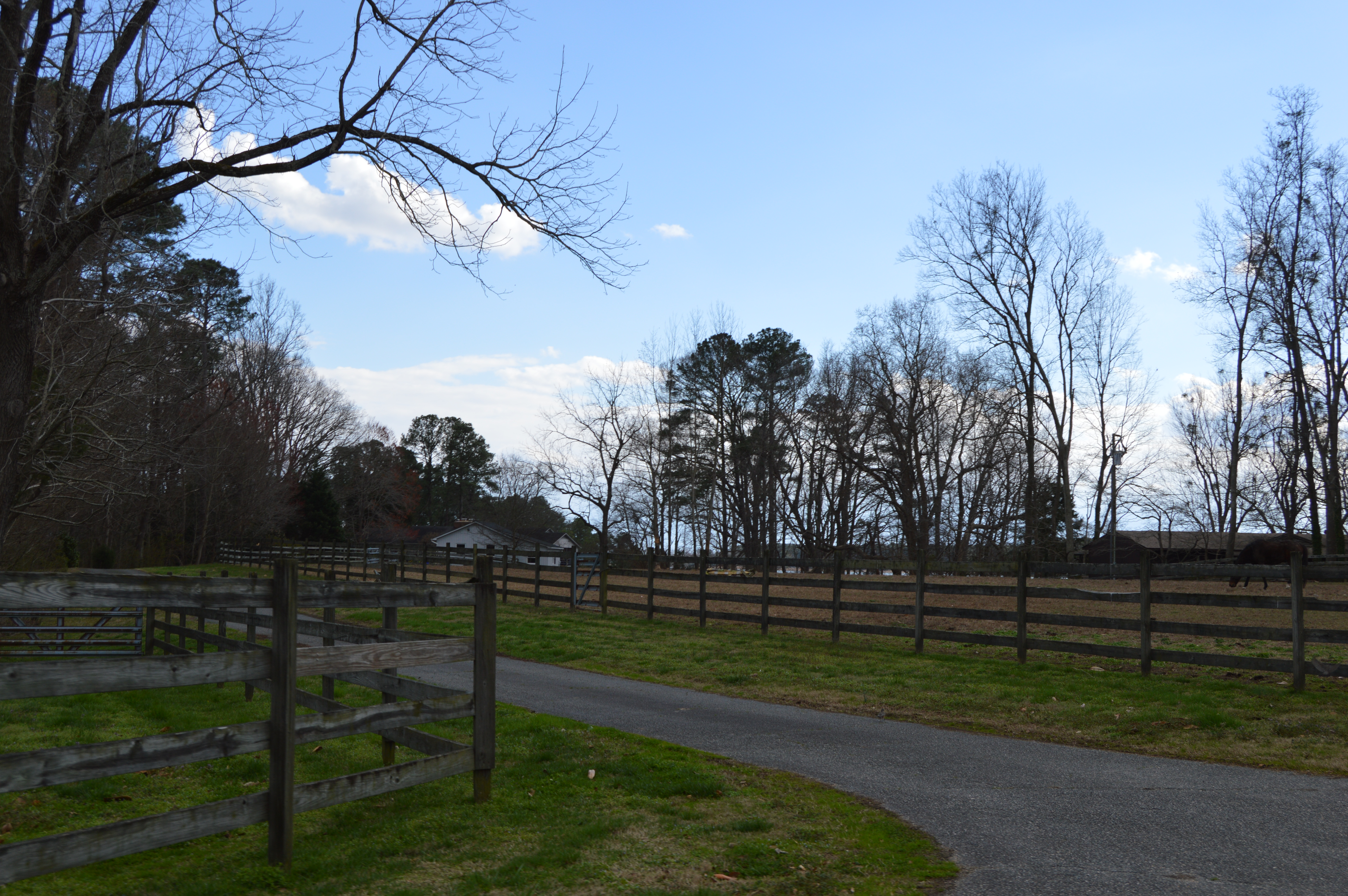
- Overview
- Interactive map of First Denbigh Parish Church Archeological Site
- Nearest city: Newport News, Virginia
- Coordinates: 37°05′36.8388″N 76°32′35.9373″W
- Area: 0.1 acres (0.040 ha)
- NRHP reference No.: 82004574
- VLR No.: 121-0037

Significant dates
- Added to NRHP: September 7, 1982
- Designated VLR: September 15, 1981

First Denbigh Parish Church Archeological Site is a historic archaeological site located at Newport News, Virginia. The site is located on the bluff overlooking the Warwick River at the mouth of Church Creek. It took its name from nearby Denbigh Plantation and was constructed in 1636.

== Original site, 1636-1686 ==
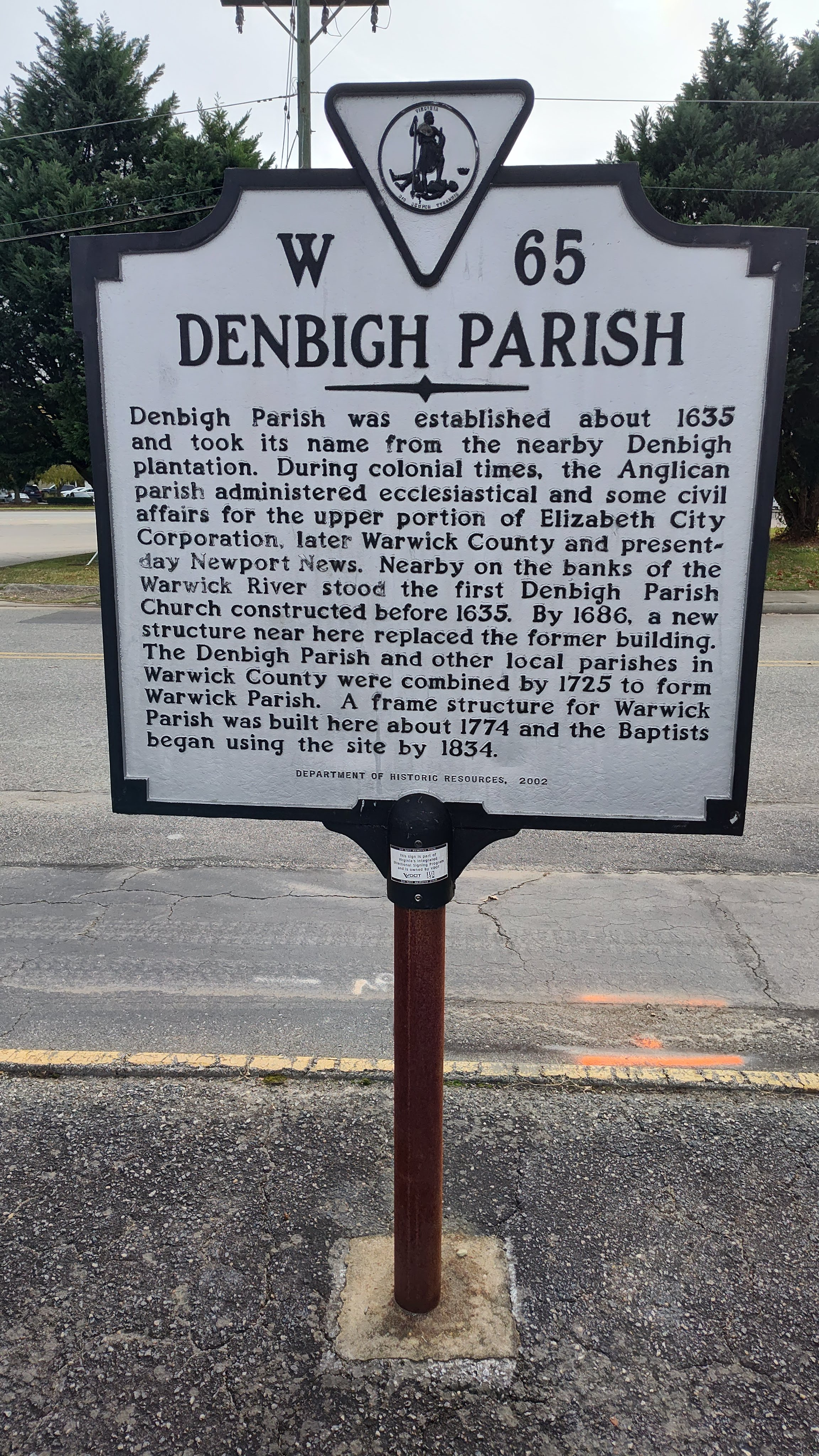
Denbigh Parish Historical Marker, South View

The earliest dated documentary reference to the existence of the first Denbigh Parish Church occurs in the 1635 patent of the Reverend Thomas Butler, who was "Clark and Pastor of Denbigh." Anthony Yonge of London, who made his will on February 20, 1636, bequeathed 500 pounds of tobacco to Denbigh Church. At that time, Denbigh was one of three parishes in Warwick County, Virginia, a political jurisdiction which was established by law in 1634. As Warwick County's other parishes, Stanley Hundred (on Mulberry Island) and Nutmeg Quarter are known to have been established by the 1620s, Denbigh Parish may also been established around the same time. It is likely that the original site may have been granted by Abraham Piersey or Captain Samuel Matthews land holdings at Denbigh Plantation, with the manor house less than 1/3 mile away.

In 1656 Nutmeg Quarter Parish was joined with Denbigh Parish at the request of the former's parishioners, who "initiated their desire by reason of their small number no longer to continue a parish...but to be united to the parish of Denbigh." The Nutmeg Quarter Church became a chapel of ease for Denbigh Parish, a reference point in later land patents.

In modern times, the original site, known as the first Denbigh Parish Church, is located on private property at 18 Walters Road. During a 1981 archaeological survey of the original site, charred timbers found suggests that the first church may have been destroyed by fire, necessitating the construction of a new building.

The site of the first Denbigh Parish Church nearer the river was abandoned permanently around 1686. Eighteenth and nineteenth century cartographers depicted the area as undeveloped woods and farmland, a condition in which it remained until the 1970s when the Shenks constructed their modern residence near the original church site.

== Later site, 1686-current ==
A new structure no larger than the first (known as the second Denbigh Parish Church) was built by 1686 about 2 miles WNW from the original site, reflecting shifting population densities.

A third frame structure for Warwick Parish (known as the third Denbigh Parish Church) was rebuilt on the later site about 1774. The second church site and third church building were visited by Bishop William Meade in 1854. He lists some of the earlier ministers in his chronicles:

- 1635, Rev. Thomas Butler, Rev. George White
- Prior to 1647, Rev. James Backler
- 1647, Rev. John Phillips
- 1680, Rev. John Lawrence
- 1688–1696, Rev. Cope D'oyley (who left to serve as rector at Bruton Parish Church from 1697 to 1702)
- 1714–1723, Rev. James Schlater
- 1754, Rev. Roscow Cole, son of William Cole (burgess)
- 1758, Rev. Thomas Davis
- 1773–1776, Rev. William Hubard
- 1785–1786, Rev. William Bland
- 1787, Mr. John Wood, Rev. Camm

=== Baptist Use ===
The Anglican Church (Church of England), which had been the state-established church in Virginia since 1609, waned dramatically after the end of the American Revolution in 1783. Congregations generally withered away or reorganized under other denominations. (The Anglican church in America itself reorganized as 'Episcopal' in 1789, without affiliation to the English crown.) Bishop Meade acknowledges the use by 'other denominations' in his 1854 visit chronicles. The church histories of the early Grafton Baptist Church and Denbigh Baptist Church corroborate a Mr. Matthew Wood leaving the former around 1796 to serve the later congregation in Denbigh, which suggests a 1796 date for initial Baptist use, which would be logically supported by Virginia's 1786 Statue of Religious Freedom and 1802 Glebe Act around that same time. Baptists are firmly documented to have been on the site by 1834. The site would also be overlappingly referred to as "Tenderbranch" from 1774 to 1833 (referring to the tender of the colonial-era gristmill 1/3 mile away, later known as Young's Mill), and "Warwick Church" from 1810 to 1881. In modern times, this later site is known as Denbigh Baptist Church and is located at 13010 Mitchell Point Road, where the current historical marker is erected.

The sites were listed on the National Register of Historic Places in 1982.
