= Samuel Mathews (colonial Virginia governor) =

Governor of the Virginia Colony (1652-1655)

Lt. Col. Samuel Mathews

Governor of the Virginia Colony
- In office 1657-1660
- Preceded by: Edward Digges
- Succeeded by: William Berkeley

Member of the Virginia Governor's Council
- In office 1656-1660

Member of the House of Burgesses for Warwick County, Virginia
- In office 1651-1654 Serving with William Whitby
- Preceded by: Thomas Harwood
- Succeeded by: Thomas Davis

Personal details
- Born: 1630 Mathews Manor plantation, Warwick County, Colony of Virginia
- Died: January 1660 (aged 29–30) Virginia Colony, British America
- Spouse: Mary Plumley
- Children: 5
- Parent(s): Samuel Mathews Sr., Frances Grenville
- Profession: Governor, military officer, planter

Lt. Col. Samuel Mathews (1630–1660), Commonwealth Governor of Virginia, of Warwick County in the English Colony of Virginia, was a member of the House of Burgesses, the Governor's Council, and served as Commonwealth Governor of Virginia from 1656 until he died in office in January 1660 (1659 A.S.). There was no Royal Governorship at the time of the "Protectorate", and the Governor technically answered to the Cromwellian Parliament, although Royalist sentiment was prevalent in the colony of Virginia at this time. The former Royalist governor Berkeley arrived to replace him on March 13, 1660.

== Early and family life ==
Samuel Mathews (Jr.) was the elder son of Samuel Matthews (Sr.) (1572-1657) and Frances Grevill West Peirsey Mathews (1590-1635). He was born at his father's plantation Mathews Manor, (later known as Denbigh), which was located on the north side of the James River at the confluence of the Warwick River and Deep Creek (about 2 miles north of Blunt Poynt) in the area which later became Warwick County, Virginia (and which is now within the city limits of Newport News).

The elder Samuel Mathews was the first of the Mathews family to emigrate from England to Virginia, arriving at Jamestown by 1619. He eventually had several other land holdings, including one near Henricus and another at Old Point Comfort. Known as Colonel Mathews, the elder Samuel became one of the most prominent men in the colony. He was a member of the Governor's Council and was actively involved in conflicts with the Native Americans. In 1635, Mathews Sr. was one of the leaders of the popular mutiny that ousted Royal Governor Sir John Harvey. Upon returning to England, the elder Mathews was eventually cleared of any charges; upon returning to Virginia, he resumed service on the Governor's Council until 1644.

His father was his mother's third husband. Frances Mary Grenville or Greville was one of four women who arrived at Jamestown from Bristol, England in September 1620 aboard the ship, Supply. She first married Captain Nathaniel West, brother of Thomas West, the third Lord Delaware, who had been governor of Virginia beginning in 1610. After West died several years later, Grenville married Abraham Peirsey, a wealthy man who had purchased Sir George Yeardley's Flowerdew Hundred Plantation after his death. Peirsey died several years later. Twice widowed, but with considerable legacies, she next married Samuel Mathews Sr. She bore at least two boys, and this man's brother Francis Mathews (1632-1673) outlived him.

== Career ==
The younger Samuel Mathews, as an adult, was known as Lt. or later Lt. Colonel Samuel Mathews, reflecting his standing in the local militia. In 1652, Warwick County voters elected him one of their representatives in the House of Burgesses, which was the lower house of the legislature, alongside veteran William Whittbye, and re-elected the pair in 1653 and 1654. In 1656, shortly before his father's death and with the consent of London authorities, Mathews was appointed to the upper house, the Governor's Council, and later that year when his predecessor Edward Digges traveled to England, became the Commonwealth Governor of Virginia, a position held until his death in January 1660.

In April 1658, mainly to signal their displeasure with Oliver Cromwell, the Burgesses ceremonially dismissed him and reelected him in a single Act. Because of his loyalty, as governor, to Cromwell, he was often assumed to be a Puritan himself, although in fact he had been known as a persecutor of the Puritan sect in Virginia in the days before Cromwell.

== Personal life ==
Governor Mathews married about 1655, but little is known about his wife, other than some sources state she was of the Cole-Digges family. They had one son, John (b. 1659 – May 1, 1706) who married Elizabeth Tavernor on March 24, 1684. John was underage when his father died, but he initially made the Denbigh Plantation in Warwick County his home, before patenting 2944 acres on Deep Creek and building a plantation known at Blunt Poynt, then also representing Warwick County in the House of Burgesses. His initial guardians were Mr. Bullock, Col. Peter Jennings and Major John Smith, with Colonel Pritchard replacing Bullock, then in June 1679 William Cole was his guardian.

== Death and legacy ==
In January 1660, shortly before the English Restoration, Matthews died in office. The Burgesses at that point simply reinstated the former Royalist Governor, William Berkeley by unanimous vote. Thus, in the view of historian Robert Beverley, Jr. writing in 1705, Virginia colony "was the last of all the King's Dominions that submitted to the Usurpation, and afterwards the first that cast it off."

Colonial Williamsburg's Ivor Noel Hume in the 1960s supervised archeological studies on the site of Mathews Manor, now located within the independent city of Newport News, Virginia. Although little remains but the foundation outline in a small park, Denbigh is on the National Park Service's National Register of Historic Places.

Government offices
Preceded by Edward Digges	Colonial Governor of Virginia; 1656–1660	Succeeded by William Berkeley
