= Herbert H. Harwood Jr. =

American author (born 1931)

Herbert Hawley Harwood Jr.
- Born: February 6, 1931 (age 95)
- Occupation: Author

Herbert Hawley Harwood Jr. (born February 6, 1931) is an American author. He has published many books, all of which are on the subject of railroad history.

== Published works ==
- Rails to the Blue Ridge. Falls Church, VA: Pioneer American Society. 1969. OCLC 54891.
- Blue Ridge Trolley: The Hagerstown & Frederick Railway. San Marino, CA: Golden West Books. 1970. OCLC 561673798.
- Chesapeake & Ohio Lightweight Passenger Equipment, 1946-1972. WV: Chesapeake & Ohio Historical Society. 1973. OCLC 1157003.
- Philadelphia's Victorian Suburban Stations. Crete, NE: J-B Pub. Co. 1975. OCLC 2723554.
- The First 50 Best of New York Central System : Book One. Baltimore, MD: Barnard, Roberts & Co. 1977. OCLC 58876233.
- The 50 Best of B & O : Book Two. Baltimore, MD: Barnard, Roberts & Co. 1977. OCLC 4258577.
- The 50 Best of PRR : Book Three. Baltimore, MD: Barnard, Roberts & Co. 1978. OCLC 6566749.
- Impossible Challenge : The Baltimore and Ohio Railroad in Maryland. Baltimore, MD: Barnard, Roberts & Co. 1979. ISBN 978-0-9341-1817-0. OCLC 5939251.
- Baltimore and its Streetcars : A Pictorial Review of the Postwar Years. New York, NY: Quadrant Press. 1984. ISBN 978-0-9152-7644-8. OCLC 12760035.
- Impossible Challenge II : Baltimore to Washington and Harpers Ferry from 1828 to 1994. Baltimore, MD: Barnard, Roberts & Co. 1994.
- Baltimore's Light Rail : Then and Now. New York, NY: Quadrant Press. 1995. ISBN 978-0-9152-7655-4. OCLC 33427105.
- Royal Blue Line : The Classic B & O train between Washington and New York. Baltimore, MD: Johns Hopkins Univ. Press. 2002. ISBN 978-0-8018-7061-3. OCLC 834356923.
- Invisible Giants: The Empires of Cleveland's Van Sweringen Brothers (Ohio). Bloomington, IN: Indiana University Press. 2003. ISBN 978-0-2533-4163-1. OCLC 475945571.
- The New York, Westchester & Boston Railway : J.P. Morgan's Magnificent Mistake. Bloomington, IN: Indiana University Press. 2008. ISBN 978-0-2533-5143-2. OCLC 173659544.
- Rails to the Blue Ridge : The Washington and Old Dominion Railroad, 1847-1968. Fairfax Station, VA: Northern Virginia Regional Park Authority. 2009. ISBN 978-0-6152-8311-1. OCLC 495727779.
- The Railroad That Never Was: Vanderbilt, Morgan and the Southern Pennsylvania Railroad. Bloomington, IN: Indiana University Press. 2010. ISBN 978-0-2533-5548-5. OCLC 502029605.
- The Lake Shore Electric Railway Story. Bloomington, IN: Indiana University Press. 2016. ISBN 978-0-2533-3797-9. OCLC 958208036.
