= Frederick Harwood =

English cricketer

Personal information
- Full name: Frederick Harwood
- Born: 1 June 1827; Mitcham, Surrey, England
- Died: 11 December 1887 (aged 60); Mitcham, Surrey, England
- Batting: Right-handed
- Bowling: Right-arm roundarm fast

Domestic team information
- Years: Team
- 1851–1865: Surrey

Career statistics
Competition	First-class
Matches	4
Runs scored	8
Batting average	2.00
100s/50s	–/–
Top score	5
Balls bowled	430
Wickets	7
Bowling average	22.57
5 wickets in innings	–
10 wickets in match	–
Best bowling	3/39
Catches/stumpings	3/–
- Source: Cricinfo, 3 April 2012

Frederick Harwood (1 June 1827 – 11 December 1887) was an English cricketer. Harwood was a right-handed batsman who bowled right-arm roundarm fast. He was born and died at Mitcham, Surrey.

Harwood made his first-class debut for Surrey against Middlesex in 1851 at The Oval. His next appearance in first-class cricket came fourteen years later in 1865 when he made three appearances for Surrey against Nottinghamshire, Sussex and Kent. In his four first-class matches, Harwood took a total of 7 wickets at an average of 22.57, with beat figures of 3/39. With the bat, he scored 8 runs with a highest of 5.
