= Queen Hith Plantation Complex Site =

Archaeological site in Virginia, United States

- U.S. National Register of Historic Places
- Interactive map of Queen Hith Plantation Complex Site
- Location: Near 161 Harwood Drive, Newport News, Virginia
- Coordinates: 37°10′47.5641″N 76°35′3.6969″W
- Area: 3.3 acres (1.3 ha)
- Built by: Thomas Harwood
- MPS: Oakland Farm Industrial Park MRA
- NRHP reference No.: 83003293
- Added to NRHP: February 24, 1983

The Queen Hith Plantation Complex Site is a historic archaeological site in the Oakland Farm area of Newport News, Virginia. It is the site of the central complex of Thomas Harwood's extensive plantation, established some time after his arrival at Jamestown in 1622. The plantation was about 1,500 acres (610 ha) in size, and extended along both banks of Skiffe's Creek. The site includes the foundational remnants of his 1643 house.

In modern times, the site is owned by the City of Newport News and is not open to the public.

== See also ==
- National Register of Historic Places listings in Newport News, Virginia
