= Warwick County Courthouses =

Historic courthouse in Virginia, US

- U.S. National Register of Historic Places
- Virginia Landmarks Register
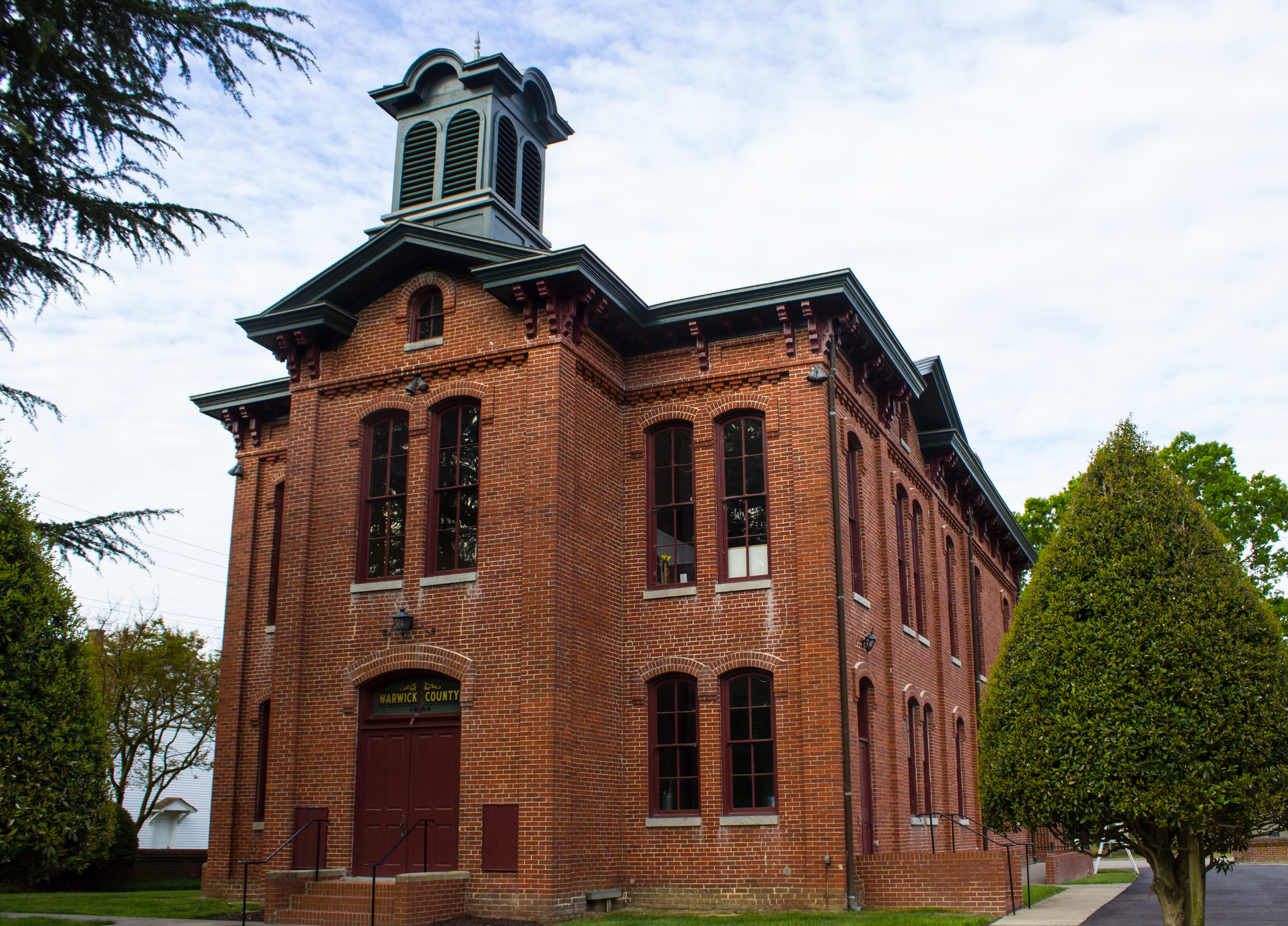
- Warwick County Courthouse, April 2013

- Location within Virginia Location within the United States
- Interactive map showing the location of Warwick County Courthouse
- Location: Old Courthouse Way, Newport News, Virginia
- Coordinates: 37°7′47″N 76°32′33″W
- Area: 1 acre (0.40 ha)
- Built: 1810, 1884, 1909
- Architectural style: Italianate, Federal
- NRHP reference No.: 88002186
- VLR No.: 121-0001

Significant dates
- Added to NRHP: November 3, 1988
- Designated VLR: February 16, 1988

Warwick County Courthouses, also known as the Warwick County Courthouse and Clerk's Office, is a historic courthouse and clerk's office located in Newport News, Virginia.

The original county courthouse was located closer to the James River at Warwick Town near Denbigh Plantation, but it is no longer standing. The county moved its seat to the new location in 1810 and built a one-story, three-room, T-shaped plan Federal-style brick building. It has a slate-covered gable roof and exterior end chimneys, and it was later enlarged by a side and rear addition. As part of the Peninsula Campaign, on the afternoon of April 5, 1862, IV Corps under BG Erasmus D. Keyes reached and looted the Warwick County Courthouse. The area used as a camp and division headquarters thereafter. The observation balloon Constitution designed by Thaddeus S. C. Lowe was anchored at the courthouse for a time. The clerk’s office was burned on December 15, 1864, and the court minute books and loose records from 1787 to 1819 were destroyed. Other records sent to Richmond, Virginia for safekeeping during the civil war were lost in the fire there on April 3, 1865.

The later courthouse was built in 1884 and is a two-story, Italianate-style brick building. It has a rectangular plan and a shallow, metal-covered, hipped roof with three shallow cross gables. It features a square wood bell cupola that rises above the central projecting bay. In 1888, the county court relocated for a short period to an area in what is now downtown Newport News. It was moved back to this location in 1896 when Newport News became an independent city. The buildings housed county offices until 1958, when Warwick County, Virginia was combined with the City of Newport News.

On the property was a Confederate monument for the Warwick Beauregards, dedicated in May 1909. In August 2020, the City of Newport News voted to remove the monument, and it was removed shortly thereafter.

The Courthouses were listed on the National Register of Historic Places in 1988.

== Surroundings ==
Directly across the street from the courthouse, Levin Smith built a 16-room hotel (Smith's Hotel) and James T. Garrow built a general store in 1883. The hotel would house lawyers and judges while court was in session. The hotel operated up till shortly after 1909, when proprietor Levin Smith died. Afterwards it became a private home. The general store was destroyed by fire in the mid 1950s and not rebuilt. The hotel building was torn down in 1985.

== See also ==
- Warwick Town
- Warwick County, Virginia
- City of Warwick, Virginia
- Denbigh, Virginia
