= Philip Harwood =

Philip Harwood (1809 – 10 December 1887) was an English journalist and Unitarian minister, known as the editor of the Saturday Review.

== Life ==
He was born in Bristol, and when young started work in a solicitor's office. After serving out his articles, he decided to enter the ministry, and studied at the University of Edinburgh. There Thomas Chalmers's lectures had the unintended effect of converting him to Unitarianism, and he became in 1835 pastor of the Unitarian congregation at Bridport. In 1839 he officiated for a time at St. Mark's Chapel, Edinburgh, where his scepticism about miracles involved him in an acrimonious controversy with George Harris of Glasgow, and other members of his denomination.

In 1840, Harwood moved from Bridport to London, where he became in 1841 assistant minister to William Johnson Fox at South Place Chapel. After a while he accepted an engagement to lecture on Sundays at the Beaumont Institution, Mile End; continued until 31 December 1843, when it was terminated by John Augustus Beaumont, son of the founder, who disliked Harwood's theology. He had already been introduced by Fox to John Forster, and had become sub-editor of The Examiner. He moved to The Spectator, and about 1849 he joined John Douglas Cook as sub-editor of the Morning Chronicle, then recently acquired for the Peelite faction. The Chronicle was sold in 1854, and Harwood followed Cook to the Saturday Review, which was started in November 1855. Harwood sub-edited it until 1868, when he became editor after Cook's death.

Harwood was seriously ill in 1881, and in December 1883 he retired from the editorship and went to live in Hastings, where he died 10 December 1887. The novelist Isabella Harwood was his daughter and she died the following year also in Hastings.

== Works ==
While at Bridport he published sermons, in one of which he strongly attacked the principle of ecclesiastical establishments. Harwood's major works were:

- Materialism in Religion; or Religious Forms and Theological Formulas, 1840.
- Church Extension and Church Extensionists, two lectures, 1840.
- German Anti-Supernaturalism. Six lectures on David Strauss's Leben Jesu, 1841.
- Six lectures on the Corn Law Monopoly and Free Trade, 1843.
- A History of the Irish Rebellion of 1798, 1844.

He is believed to have been the translator of Georg Lorenz Bauer's work on the Theology of the Old Testament, 1838.
