= Ian Harwood =

English lutenist, luthier and teacher (1931–2011)

Ian Harwood MBE
- Born: 29 August 1931; Petersfield, Hampshire, England
- Died: 28 July 2011 (aged 79)
- Occupations: Lutenist; luthier; teacher
- Years active: 1950s–2010s
- Organizations: The Lute Society; Campian Consort

Ian Harwood MBE (29 August 1931 – 28 July 2011) was an English lutenist, luthier and teacher.

== Early life ==
Harwood was born in Petersfield, Hampshire, and attended The Pilgrims' School while a chorister at Winchester Cathedral.

== Career ==
As a conscientious objector, he completed his National Service operating a synchrotron at Addenbrooke's Hospital; as the machine broke down frequently, he used his spare time in the workshop to construct his first lute. In 1956, he co-founded The Lute Society, and then became an alto lay clerk in the Choir of New College Oxford, where he began a career playing and making lutes near Oxford.

In 1960, he took up a position as a lay clerk at Ely Cathedral, where he built lutes for ten years. In 1964, he received the Tovey Prize for research into the sources of English lute music. He performed and recorded lute music with consorts such as the Campian Consort, which he founded in 1967.

Harwood's research identified Mathew Holmes as the author of a collection of Elizabethan lute books, described as being more important than the Fitzwilliam Virginal Book.

Harwood was elected president of The Lute Society in 1999 and appointed Member of the British Empire in 2008.

== Publications ==
- Harwood, Ian, "The Origins of the Cambridge Lute Manuscripts", Lute Society Journal vol. 5 pp. 32–48 (1963).
- Harwood, Ian, "The Origins of the Cambridge Lute Manuscripts: A Postscript", Lute Society Journal vol. 6 p. 29 (1964).
- Harwood, Ian; Prynne, Michael (1975). A brief history of the lute. Richmond: Lute Society. ISBN 978-0-905655-00-0. OCLC 2965786.
- Harwood, Ian, "A Lecture in Musick, with the Practice thereof by Instrument in the Common Schooles, Mathew Holmes and Music at Oxford University c.1588-1627", Lute Society Journal vol. 45 pp. 1–70 (2005)
- Harwood, Ian, John H. Robinson and Stewart McCoy (eds), The Mathew Holmes Manuscripts I: Cambridge University Library MS Dd.2.11 (Albury: Lute Society, 2010).
- Harwood, Ian (2012). Sweet Broken Music: the Elizabethan and Jacobean Consort Lesson. Ashgate Publishing, Limited. ISBN 9780754600923.
