= Thomas Harwood =

Virginia soldier, landowner and politician

5th Speaker of the Virginia House of Burgesses
- In office 1647–1649
- Preceded by: Ambrose Harmer
- Succeeded by: Edward Major

Member of the Virginia Governor's Council
- In office 1652

Member of the House of Burgesses for Warwick County
- In office 1647-1649 Serving with Randle Crew, Thomas Flint, John Walker
- Preceded by: Thomas Taylor
- Succeeded by: William Whittbye

Member of the House of Burgesses for Warwick County
- In office October 1645 Serving with Thomas Bernard, Henry Heyrick
- Preceded by: John Walker
- Succeeded by: Thomas Flint

Member of the House of Burgesses for Warwick River
- In office 1640–1642 Serving with Thomas Barnard, Zachary Crip, Thomas Flint, THomas Barnett, William Whittbey
- Preceded by: position created
- Succeeded by: Thomas Flint

Member of the House of Burgesses for Mulberry Island
- In office 1629–1633 Serving with Phettiplace Clause, Anthony Barham, Thomas Flynt, Thomas Bennett, William Spencer
- Preceded by: Percivall Wood
- Succeeded by: position abolished

Personal details
- Born: Lincolnshire, England
- Died: 1652 Warwick County, Colony of Virginia
- Spouse(s): Grace (1st), Anne (2nd)
- Children: Humphrey Harwood, Grace, Margaret

Captain Thomas Harwood (c. 1600 – 1652) emigrated from England and became a soldier, landowner and politician in the Colony of Virginia. He founded a family which like him for generations often represented the area now known as Newport News, but which in his day was known as Mulberry Island, and later Warwick River and still later Warwick County. Despite coming into conflict with royal governor Sir John Harvey in 1635, and a gap in legislative service, Harwood became the 5th speaker of the House of Burgesses.

== Early and family life ==
Harwood was born in 1600 in Thurby, Lincolnshire, England, the youngest son of George Harwood and his wife, Dublin-born Catherine Phesant. He immigrated to Jamestown in the Virginia colony from England aboard the Margaret and John in 1623, shortly after the Native American massacre of 1622. His wife Grace arrived on the George later that year, and they were living in the Neck O'Land area near Jamestown in 1624.

His uncle Sir Edward Harwood was a stockholder in the Virginia Company and his brother (according to various sources either another uncle or elder brother) William was captain-governor of the Martin's Hundred settlement, including during that massacre.

By 1625 Thomas Harwood and his wife Grace had moved to Mulberry Island, and were tenants living at a house owned by Capt. William Peirce. However Harwood's initial land grant at Blunt Point proved uncultivable, and Grace presumably died shortly thereafter, for Harwood married Anne, who became the mother of his known children: Humphrey Harwood (1642-1698; who succeeded to his landholdings and continued his political involvement) and daughters Grace and Margaret. His daughter would receive land from the estate of Capt. Thomas Peirce and live at William Peirce's house after her marriage to Thomas Iken, possibly indicating her mother's family relations, but she died without issue a few years later.

== Career ==
On December 31, 1619 Harwood first patented land on Mulberry Island. In May 1626, he was awarded 100 acres of land at the mouth of Blunt Point Creek. Over time Harwood increased his Mulberry Island acreage with various purchases as well as governmental grants. He also patented large tracts on both sides of Skiffe's Creek (then called Kethes Creek), based on immigrants he had brought to the colony. Harwood created a plantation on Skiffe's Creek called Queen Hith (a word meaning harbor) or "Queen Hive". Although Harwood sold a plantation called Queen Hive to Edward Hurd in 1636 and Capt Nathaniel Hurd patented land at Queen Hith in 1652, this man's son and heir, Humphrey upon reaching majority in 1670, renewed and extended patents for 3644 acres.

On July 4, 1627, William Peirce named Harwood as his second-in-command for a military expedition upstream on the James River against the Chickahominy.

Warwick County voters elected Thomas Harwood multiple times as one of their representatives to the House of Burgesses, although his district's name changed often. Until the mid-1640s, Harwood was the only consistently re-elected burgess from the Mulberry Island/Warwick river area, to the extent that anyone from the area was documented as attending legislative sessions. In the mid-1630s, Governor Sir John Harvey became unpopular, and the Burgesses expelled him in 1635. Harwood and Francis Pott sailed to England with Harvey, but carrying letters to the King as representatives of the House of Burgesses and council. Harvey had Harwood jailed temporarily in England, but he was quickly released, and returned to Virginia to acclaim. His uncle William of Martin's Hundred was also summoned to England by the Privy Council in 1635, and presumably questioned about Governor Harvey, but never returned to the colony.

Thomas Harwood won several later elections for the House of Burgesses, but did not serve in every term during the 1640s. When the legislature established county boundaries in 1642, "all the divident of Mr. Thomas Harwood" became Warwick County's northern boundary. One historian speculates Harwood and 35 men from Warwick County accompanied William Claiborne in a campaign against native Americans in 1643-44. Harwood was also a tobacco viewer, safeguarding the quality of the colony's main export. Fellow burgesses elected Harwood Speaker of the House of Burgesses in 1647 and re-elected him in 1649. (A 1626 dispute concerning funds Harwood paid Claiborne for a boat not received having been resolved.) In the latter session, the legislature declared that doubting the succession of Charles II to his father's throne would be treason. Harwood was named to the legislature's upper body (the Governor's Council) after the colony recognized Parliament's authority and shortly before his death in 1652.

== Death and legacy ==
Harwood died in 1652, and likely was buried on his plantation.

His son and heir Humphrey Harwood was still a minor when his father died, so neighboring planter William Whitaker was appointed guardian for him and his sisters, who presumably on Humphrey's behalf took out a patent for 2070 acres in Warwick County in November 1652, mentioning that 1350 of them had been granted to Capt. Thomas Harwood. Their mother Ann also patented 300 acres along Utey's Creek in nearby York County in October 1652, and in March 1653 received 150 acres east of Skeath's Creek enjoining Humphrey Harwood's tract. Soon thereafter, the widow Ann Harwood bequeathed "16 cows, 5 Negroes, etc." to her children before marrying Dr. Henry Blagrave of Warwick county.

Harwood's descendants continued to represent Warwick county in the House of Burgesses for more than a century, the first being Humphrey, then his son William. Grandson (this man's great-grandson) William Jr. and great-grandson Edward also continued the family's tradition of political involvement. In modern times, a dam across Skiffe's Creek created a reservoir which remains crucial to the water supply of Newport News. Subsequent archeological excavations indicated that Harwood descendants improved the house and made that plantation their main residence until about 1720, when his grandson William moved the family's headquarters further inland.

His great-grandson William Harwood Jr. in 1769 completed a new manor house inland, which he called Endview Plantation. Although it was damaged during the American Revolutionary War, and again in 1862 during the American Civil War (when owned by his great-grandson and Confederate sympathizer Dr. William Harwood Curtis), it remains today as a house museum (restored to 1862) surrounded by a public park, all operated by the City of Newport News.
