= Marian Fleming Harwood =

Scottish-born Australian scholar and pacifist (1846 – 1934)

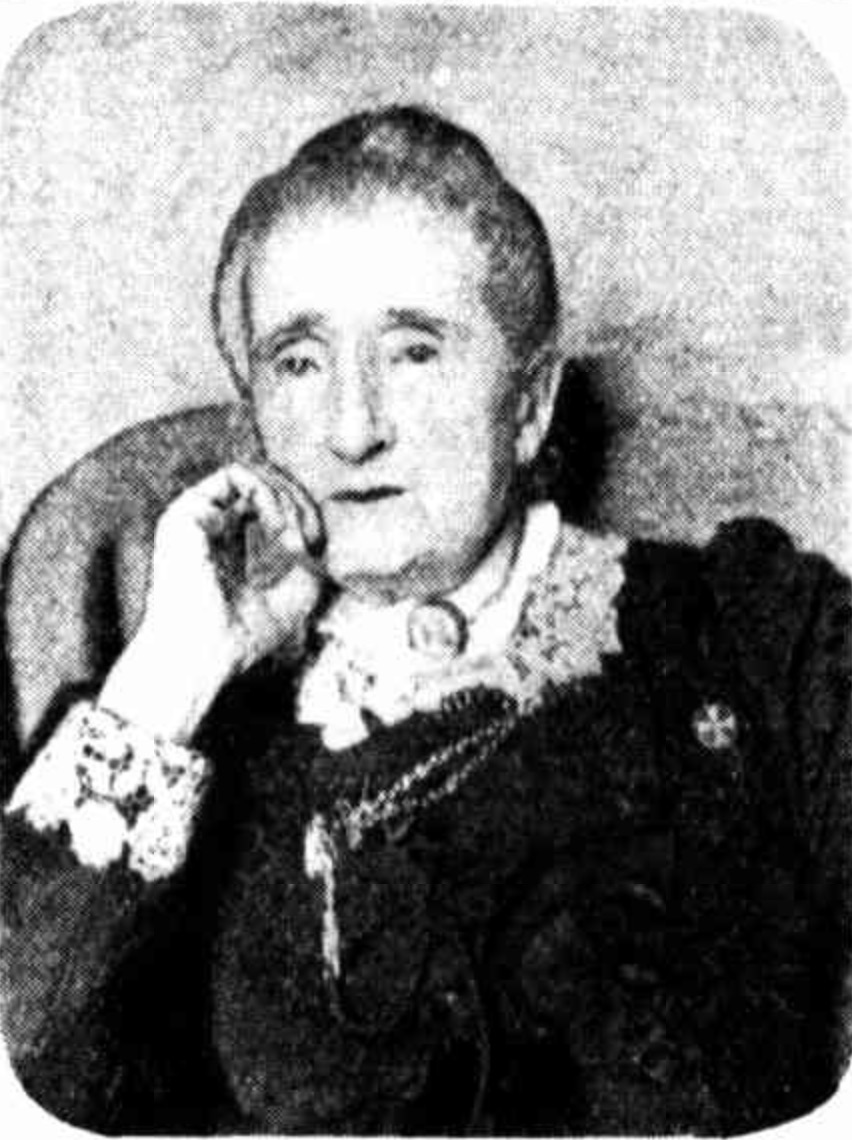
- Born: 9 March 1846; Greenock
- Died: 1934 (aged 87–88); Bellevue Hill
- Alma mater: University of Sydney; University of Melbourne
- Occupation: Linguist, pacifist, philanthropist
- Works: pacifism

Marian Fleming Harwood (9 March 1846 – 28 July 1934) was a Scottish-born Australian scholar, linguist, pacifist, and philanthropist.

== Life, education and teaching career ==
Marian Fleming Harwood was born on 9 March 1846 in Greenock, Renfrewshire, Scotland to Henry Reid, merchant, and his wife Catherine (born Barnett). She was raised in Belfast in a liberal environment as a pacifist and feminist. She took French lessons from her mother and learned German at the Belfast Academy.

She studied romance philology under Heinrich Morf at the University of Zurich, Switzerland where she counted Matthew Arnold among her friends. On 2 December 1885, she married Septimus Harwood, an English-born medical practitioner, at Newtownbreda Presbyterian Church, County Down. Next year, she moved to New South Wales, Australia for her husband's medical treatment but returned to Ireland, childless, on his death in 1889.

After her mother's death, she came back to Australia. In March 1896, she enrolled at the University of Sydney with granted admission Ad eundem from the Royal University of Ireland. She obtained her bachelor's degree in 1897. She then completed her master's degree from the school of English and German, University of Melbourne in 1900.

She later became a member of the Teachers' Association of New South Wales and taught French and German privately.

Eye problems forced her to resign from the National Council of Women in 1914 and as editor of Pax in 1916.

She died on 29 July 1934 at Quambaar, Bellevue Hill, Australia.

== Peace activist ==
In 1907, with Rose Scott, she co-founded Sydney International Peace Society. Between 1909 and 1914, she served its vice-president. She played an important role in its activities until her death. She offered prizes to school children for writing essays on peace. In August 1910, she represented the peace societies of Sydney and Melbourne at the 18th Universal Peace Congress in Stockholm. During her visit, she spoke on the Australian peace movement at the University of Freiburg, Germany and at a conference at Coventry, England, where she met several leaders of the international peace movements including Norman Angell. Although she supported the formation of the League of Nations, she was sceptical about its role in bringing peace.

== Publications ==
At the request of the Shakespeare Society of New South Wales, she wrote a book, The Shakespeare Cult in Germany from the Sixteenth Century to the Present Time, which was published in Sydney in 1907. In a pamphlet, The Neglect of the Study of Modern Languages in Australia, she advocated compulsory oral examinations in French and German at Australian universities and the teaching of spoken foreign languages in schools from kindergarten level. Between 1910 and 1917, as a member of the Teachers' Association of New South Wales, she instituted a yearly series of lectures in foreign languages. In 1917, these lectures were taken over by the Modern Language Association, of which she remained a member. She also published monographs on several subjects ranging from the functioning of the peace societies to the roles of international peace conferences and her reminiscences of Rose Scott. She made extensive correspondence with a number of international pacifist and feminist organizations.

== Editorship ==
On her return from Stockholm after attending the 18th Universal Peace Congress, she started a journal, Pax, in 1912, and became its editor. She edited Pax from July 1912 until its demise in June 1916. She also set up a library of peace literature at her rooms in Sydney, where she taught languages. This library was used by peace activists in the 1960s.

== Philanthropy ==
She donated beds in many children's homes and hospitals and in each of the Queen Victoria homes for consumptives. She also contributed money to the New South Wales branch of London Peace Society.

== Feminist ==
She was interested in feminist organizations. When she was in England, she observed the suffrage movement and wrote on the Australian women's movement in Christian Commonwealth. As a representative of the National Council of Women, Australia, she addressed in a conference of women held at Brussels and spoke about women's conditions in Australia.

== See also ==
- List of peace activists
