= Paul Harwood =

English cricketer

Personal information
- Full name: Paul James Harwood
- Born: 16 February 1977 (age 49); King's Lynn, Norfolk, England
- Batting: Left-handed
- Bowling: Right-arm fast-medium

Domestic team information
- Years: Team
- 1994–1998: Norfolk

Career statistics
Competition	List A
Matches	1
Runs scored	1
Batting average	1.00
100s/50s	–/–
Top score	1
Balls bowled	–
Wickets	–
Bowling average	–
5 wickets in innings	–
10 wickets in match	–
Best bowling	–
Catches/stumpings	–/–
- Source: Cricinfo, 28 June 2011

Paul James Harwood (born 16 February 1977) is a former English cricketer. Harwood was a left-handed batsman who bowled right-arm fast-medium. He was born in King's Lynn, Norfolk.

Harwood made his debut for Norfolk in the 1994 Minor Counties Championship against Suffolk. Harwood played Minor counties cricket for Norfolk from 1994 to 1998, which included 2 Minor Counties Championship matches and 4 MCCA Knockout Trophy matches. He made his only List A appearance against Durham in the 1998 NatWest Trophy. In this match, he scored a single run before being dismissed by Nick Phillips.
