= Denbigh Plantation Site =

Archaeological site in Virginia, United States

- U.S. National Register of Historic Places
- Virginia Landmarks Register
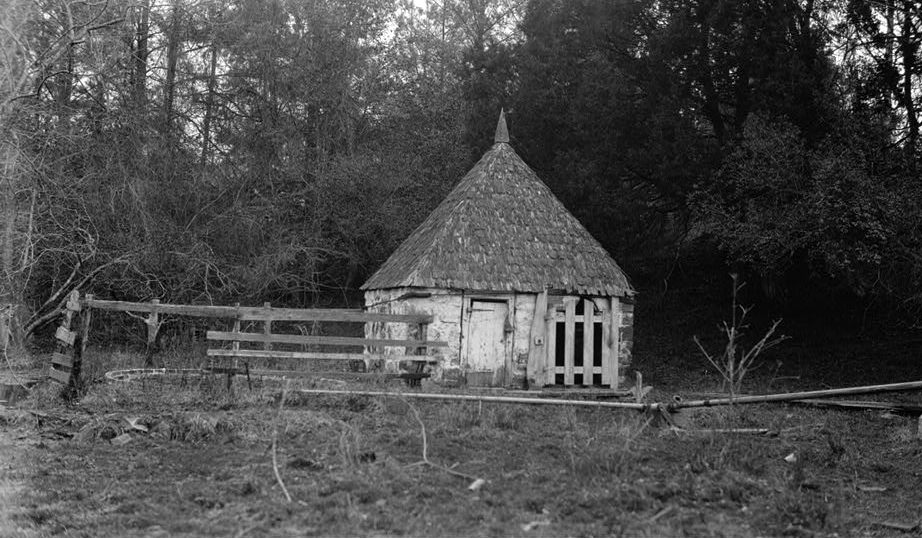
- Denbigh Plantation springhouse in the 1930s

- Location within Virginia Location within the United States
- Location: 10 Blacksmythe Ln., Newport News, Virginia
- Coordinates: 37°5′24.3″N 76°32′20″W
- Area: 390 acres (160 ha)
- Built: 1630
- NRHP reference No.: 70000873
- VLR No.: 121-0008

Significant dates
- Added to NRHP: February 16, 1970
- Designated VLR: December 2, 1969

Denbigh Plantation, also known as Mathews Manor, is a historic archaeological site located at Newport News, Virginia.

The earliest owner of land in this area is known to be merchant Abraham Peirsey (who first came to Virginia in 1616 aboard the ship Susan), and died on 16 January 1628. The name Denbigh is first recorded in 1635 in a will, but it is very likely the Anglican parish from which it draws its name was established a decade earlier, at the same time as the other parishes in the area.

== Matthews Family ==
Captain Samuel Mathews acquired the property upon his marriage to Peirsey's widow, Frances Greville. (Frances Greville had arrived in Virginia in 1620 as one of four women aboard the Supply, married Lt Col Nathaniel West (d. 1623/4), then Abraham Piersey (d. 1628), then Samuel Matthews) Greville would die around 1633. Mathews would spend much of his later life in England, eventually remarrying to a daughter of Sir Thomas Hinton. Wealth in Virginia and political power in England would make him a key figure in the early politics of the Virginia colony.

The house, to be known as Mathews Manor, was built about 1626, possibly started by Peirsey. The post-medieval half-timbered Mathews Manor included a projecting porch and center chimney, both characteristic of Virginia's earliest substantial dwellings. Mathews's original grand house burned about 1650 and was replaced with a less substantial home nearby by his son, Samuel Mathews Jr. (1630–1660), a popular loyalist-leaning governor of Colonial Virginia (1656–1660) during the commonwealth period. John Mathews, b. 1659 (son of Samuel Mathews Jr, grandson of Capt Mathews) is known to have lived at the home as a child, until sometime after receiving a patent on 9 March 1678 for 2944 acres on Deep Creek about 2 miles south of this location, near Blunt Poynt (Blount Point).

It is recorded that on 24 Jun 1679, William Cole was serving as guardian for the young John Mathews. William Cole had purchased nearby Boldrup Plantation in April 1671, and held it through his death in 1694. William Cole's daughter Susannah married Dudley Digges and William's own second wife was Anne Digges, both of children of Edward Digges, cementing the Cole-Digges family of Virginia.

== Warwicktowne ==
In 1680, the Virginia House of Burgesses created a port town at the convergence of the Warwick River and Deep Creek. This was accomplished via the purchase of 50 acres of land from Denbigh Plantation. By 1691, this became an urban center including a courthouse, jail, and several houses. By 1730 it was a small commercial center, including a tobacco inspection warehouse, shipbuilding facilities, and wharf. By 1752, a free school for poor children was present, supported by the county.

Property owners in Warwick Town included William Digges and Richard Young, who operated a tavern there.

== Digges Family ==
Denbigh plantation was acquired by the Digges family between 1698 and 1720, first by Cole Digges, grandson (and nephew) of William Cole, the same who had been guardian of the young John Mathews. The Digges family constructed another manor house very near the Mathews Manor house. Digges family members also owned the Bellfield/E.D. plantation in York County at that time. William Digges advertised for overseers for Denbigh in 1783 and 1784, and in 1785 advertised for sale between 600 and 800 acres near "New-Port-News", possibly Denbigh plantation.

Cole Digges and William Digges represented Warwick County as burgesses (and Cole Digges served on the Virginia Governor's Council) before the American Revolutionary War, and William Digges Jr. (who married one of his uncle's daughters) served in the a revolutionary convention and in the Virginia House of Delegates. His brother Cole Digges also served in the Virginia Ratification Convention.

== Young Family ==
The Digges family sold the 2700-acre plantation to a Mr. (Richard or John) Young in 1810, the same year a new Warwick Town courthouse was built near the main road. In 1813 the Warwick Town charter was repealed, and that portion of the property reverted to agriculture. Mr. Young later divided the area into four properties, keeping the one called Denbigh for himself, and naming the other three Quarterfield, Horse Point, and Reedy Branch, and giving them to his children. A William Garrow Young (b. 1814, wife Anne Greene Young) inherited the Denbigh estate at some point. The family would flee in 1861 to live out the American Civil War in a Salisbury, North Carolina hotel. During the American Civil War, both confederate and union troops occupied the Young Farm. William Garrow Young served as a 1st Lt. in the Warwick Beauregards and is buried near the plantation house site.

== Reconstruction Era ==
In 1869, the area previously known as Warwick Town, now a 300-acre farm, was sold to by the Youngs to Hudson and Sallie Mench, who operated a sawmill here for 50 years. Their surname is the source of the modern neighborhood's name of Menchville.

The last Denbigh mansion burned in 1877 and was never replaced. When William and Anne Young died in 1893, the remainder of the estate went to their six children, which included physician Dr. John A. Young, George Young, Betty Young, and three others. A Richard Young is recorded as owning land in this area in 1882, when he granted prior glebe land to a church in the area. The Young family began selling off large chunks of acreage at a time in the late 1800s. A George and Betty Young were living in the separate kitchen and dairy house of the prior mansion in 1935, and died without children.

In 1897, Mennonites established a colony nearby ("The Colony"), and that colony continued to grow rapidly over the next few decades next to and around the historical area of Denbigh Plantation. They continued to farm the land, as well as constructed a dairy and began residential development.

== Modern times, Archaeological Study ==
By 1931, the former area of Warwick Town had become a municipal prison farm. Following World War II, Warwick County was reincorporated as Warwick City in 1952, then merged into the City of Newport News in 1958. Many former farms became residential developments and/or industrial parks, but archeological research conducted first. Colonial Williamsburg's renowned archeologist Ivor Noël Hume excavated the Denbigh Plantation Site during the 1960s. His findings revealed much about early domestic life in the Virginia colony. In addition to the manor house, the site also includes several 17th-century industrial sites and the archeological remains of the 18th-century home of the Digges family. The foundations of both the Digges and Mathews houses have been capped and delineate their outlines, one with a historical marker in a small park at 10 Blacksmythe Lane. An 18th-century dairy and early 19th-century kitchen associated with the Digges homestead are still standing. The earliest known porcelain in Virginia, as well as other early artifacts, were found here during excavation. Although now surrounded by residential development, these sites are preserved within neighborhood parks.

It was listed on the National Register of Historic Places in 1970.

== See also ==
- First Denbigh Parish Church Archeological Site
- Samuel Matthews (captain)
- Cole Digges (burgess)
- Warwick County Courthouses
- Warwick County, Virginia
- Newport News, Virginia
