= Baron Harwood =

English cricketer

Baron Harwood (14 August 1852 – 16 December 1915) was an English cricketer active in 1877 who played for Lancashire. He was born in Darwen and died in Moses Gate, Lancashire. He appeared in one first-class match as a righthanded batsman who bowled right arm fast. He scored no runs and held two catches. He took one wickets with a best analysis of one for 16.
