= Edward Harwood (Virginia politician) =

American planter and politician

Member of the Virginia House of Delegates for Warwick County, Virginia
- In office May 7, 1781 – May 4, 1783 Serving with Cole Digges
- Preceded by: Cole Digges
- Succeeded by: Wilson Miles Cary
- In office 1777 – April 20, 1780 Serving with Francis Leigh, Cole Digges
- Preceded by: Cole Digges Jr.
- Succeeded by: John West

Personal details
- Born: Warwick County, Colony of Virginia
- Died: Virginia
- Spouse(s): Elizabeth Reade, Elizabeth Burwell Hewitt
- Children: 4 daughters
- Parent(s): Mary and William Harwood Jr.
- Relatives
- Occupation: officer, planter, politician

Edward Harwood (circa 1740 – after 1807) was a planter, justice of the peace, military officer and politician who represented Warwick County in the Virginia House of Delegates.

== Early and family life ==
The second surviving son of Mary Pendleton and her planter and patriot husband, Col. William Harwood, also had four sisters (three of whom married). His father was at least the fourth generation to share the first name William (as did this man's elder brother, William Harwood (1737-October 1, 1795)). Their father established Endview Plantation in 1769 (which this man would operate for decades) as well as represented Warwick county for three decades in the Virginia General Assembly, including in the House of Burgesses, five Virginia Revolutionary Conventions and the first session of the Virginia House of Delegates before dying in September 1780. His great-grandfather, Captain Thomas Harwood, sailed to the Virginia colony in 1620 and patented land on what was then called Mulberry Island in the James River (and which became Warwick County, which is now part of Newport News, Virginia). Captain Harwood had a brother or uncle William Harwood who emigrated to Virginia to live at and govern Martin's Hundred before his death in the massacre of 1622. Their noted relative, Sir Edward Harwood (for whom this boy may have been named) had invested in the Virginia Company of London and other colonial enterprises, as well as once briefly traveled to the Virginia colony before his death during the siege of Maastrict in 1632.

== Career ==
Harwood, like his father and previous generations of this family in the colony, was a planter, presumably cultivating the area's main export crop, tobacco, and definitely used enslaved labor at Endview plantation. Despite some families' use of primogeniture to maintain landholdings, this younger son came to own more slaves in Warwick County than his elder brother by the 1787 tax census, which may have been one reason that his brother William Harwood and possibly their sister Elizabeth moved to what eventually became Shelbyville, Kentucky, where William died in 1795. In 1782, Edward Harwood owned 41 slaves in Warwick County, William owned 23 slaves and their brother Thomas owned 6 slaves, and the following year William owned 18 slaves, third only to Wilson Miles Cary and William Digges. In 1787, Thomas Harwood again failed to appear in the tax census (i.e. died or moved away), but Edward Harwood owned 21 adult slaves and six enslaved teenagers (as well as a horse and 21 cattle) in Warwick county, compared to his brother William who owned 9 adult slaves and 12 enslaved teenagers (as well as five horses and 50 cattle).

Edward Harwood also continued the family's tradition of political involvement in Warwick County. He attained his first local office, that of justice of the peace, in 1770. He also led the local militia, attaining the rank of colonel in 1782, and became Warwick's county lieutenant in 1788 (although his governmental claim based on that military service was rejected).

Following the death of his neighbor Cole Digges in 1777, Harwood was elected to serve as one of the burgesses representing Warwick County, and won re-election four times, mostly serving alongside fellow planter (and the late Cole Digges' cousin), also Cole Digges.

== Personal life ==
He married first Elizabeth Reade (1751–1777), the only child of John Reade, whose landholdings are unclear because of incomplete Warwick County records. They had four daughters who survived their parents. After his first wife's death, Harwood married Elizabeth Burwell Hewitt. Sarah Reede Harwood married Littleton Kendall; Elizabeth Reade Harwood married Henry Lee of nearby York County (who died) and around 1792 married for the second time to Richard Hansford (who survived her and lived in Warwick County); Dorothy Harwood married Johnson Tabb; and Mary Harwood married Mr. Chapman. Although one site states that "Big Humphrey" Harwood was this man's son and living at Endview as the century began, another family historian names Big Humphrey as William's son and discusses two different Harwodd plantations transferred in Warwick County in 1795, the year of the elder brother's death in Kentucky.

By 1807, according to other genealogists, Edward Harwood was living in York County, probably with a daughter and husband, who after her death lived in Warwick county. Complicating matters, another man of the same name (who also had a son named Edward) lived in Charles City County (2 counties upstream on the James River west of Warwick County) in the late 18th century.
