= William Henry Harwood =

English entomologist (1840–1917)

William Henry Harwood (25 February 1840 – 24 December 1917) was an English entomologist and collector of lepidoptera. He was among the pioneers of using sleeves of muslin to rear lepidoptera outdoors on their host plants.

Harwood was born in Colchester and after going to the Royal Grammar School he apprenticed with the chemists, Smith and Shenstone. He then decided to spend more time in the outdoors for his health and began to study the life-histories of lepidoptera by placing muslin sleeves over the caterpillars on their host trees. He later also took an interest in the beetles and the hymenoptera.

Harwood advised Charles Rothschild that Ray Island off Essex be chosen for conservation.

He married Elizabeth, daughter of James Netherwood Dixon, in 1875. She died in 1914. They had four sons, two of whom, Philip and Bernard Smith, also became keen entomologists. Part of his collections are held in the Hall collection at Oldham Museum.
