= Brown Harwood =

Brown Harwood (March 8, 1872 – June 26, 1963) was an American realtor and prominent leader of the Ku Klux Klan. A resident of Fort Worth, Texas, Harwood was a charter member of the Klan in that city; he eventually became Grand Dragon of the Texas Ku Klux Klan. In 1922, Harwood became imperial (national) klazik (vice-president) of the Ku Klux Klan. He stayed in that position until April 14, 1925; the arrest of Klan leader D. C. Stephenson for rape and murder in Indiana turned public opinion against the organization.

== Personal ==
He was a second-generation Klansman, as his father, Dr. Musgrove Pettus Harwood, was a member of the original post-Civil War Klan. His father was a resident of Pulaski, Tennessee, where the Klan was founded.

After leaving the Klan, he returned to real estate development in Fort Worth, Texas. He lived a quiet life thereafter and died in 1963 at the age of 91. He was given a freemason funeral and is buried at Rose Hill Cemetery in Fort Worth.
