= Isabella Harwood =

British novelist

- Born: 14 June 1837; Dorset, United Kingdom of Great Britain and Ireland
- Died: 29 May 1888 (aged 50); St Mary-in-the-Castle, Hastings, United Kingdom of Great Britain and Ireland
- Writing career
- Pen name: Ross Neil
- Period: Victorian

Isabella Harwood or Ross Neil (14 June 1837 – 29 May 1888) was a British novelist who also wrote dramas in verse.

== Biography ==
Harwood was probably born in Dorset in 1837 where her parents Philip Harwood and his wife Isabella Neil lived. Phillip Harwood was then a Unitarian minister in Bridport.

Between 1864 and 1870 she wrote four sensational novels which were published without attribution. Between 1871 and 1883 she wrote a number of unfashionable blank verse dramas which were said to be readable. Two were produced in Edinburgh and London but they were not favourably received.

Harwood lived with her father in London and then in Hastings. She died in St Mary-in-the-Castle in 1888 in Hastings a year after her father.

== Works ==
=== Novels ===
- Abbot's Cleve
- Carleton Grange
- Raymond's Heroine
- Kathleen
- The Heir Expectant
- Plays
- Lady Jane Grey; Inez, or, The Bride of Portugal

=== Plays ===
- The Cid; The King and the Angel; Duke for a Day; or The Tailor of Brussels
- Elfinella, or, Home from Fairyland; Lord and Lady Russell
- Arabella Stuart; The Heir of Linne; Tasso
- Eglantine
- Andrea the Painter; Claudia's Choice; Orestes; Pandora
