= Endview Plantation =

Historic house in Virginia, United States

- Endview Plantation (Harwood Plantation)
- U.S. National Register of Historic Places
- Virginia Landmarks Register
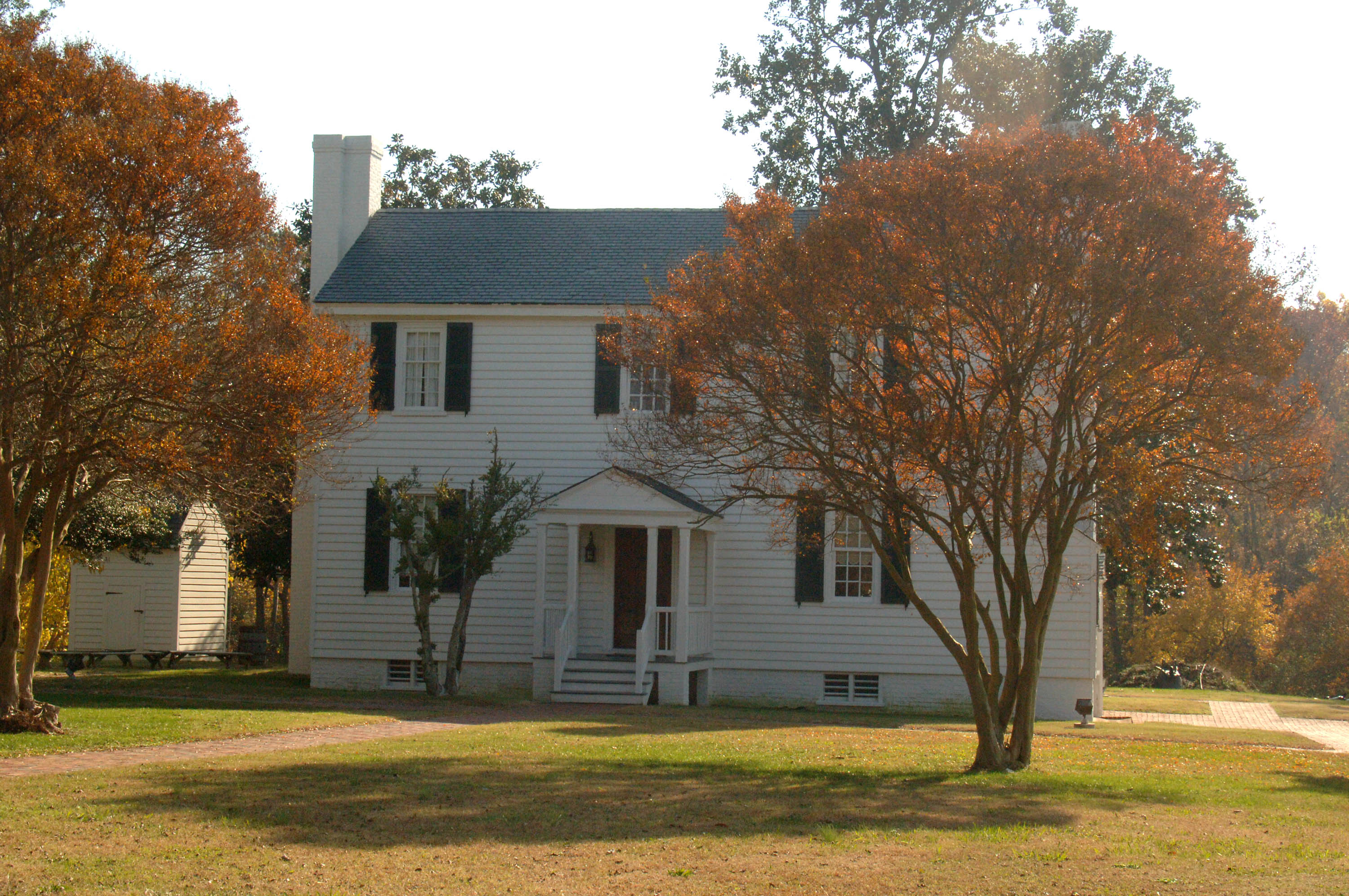

- Location within Virginia
- Location: 362 Yorktown Road, Newport News, Virginia
- Coordinates: 37°12′12″N 76°34′30″W
- Area: 24.7 acres (10.0 ha)
- Built: 1769
- Architect: William Harwood
- Architectural style: Georgian
- NRHP reference No.: 08000391
- VLR No.: 121-0002

Significant dates
- Added to NRHP: May 8, 2008
- Designated VLR: March 20, 2008

Endview Plantation (Harwood Plantation) is an 18th-century plantation, including a park and historic home now operated by the independent city of Newport News, Virginia, located on Virginia State Route 238 in the Lee Hall community.

== History ==
Earlier known as the Harwood Plantation, the house was built in 1769 by William Harwood along the Great Warwick Road, which linked the colonial capital of Williamsburg with the town of Hampton (the county seat of what was then Elizabeth City County) and the great natural harbor of Hampton Roads. The house and grounds were used by military forces during the Revolutionary War, since Harwood was a patriot and political leader, as well as farmed using enslaved labor. General Thomas Nelson, Jr.'s Virginia militia used it as a resting place on September 28, 1781, en route to Yorktown shortly before the surrender of the British troops under Lord Cornwallis. Harwood served many terms in the House of Burgesses representing what was then known as Warwick County, as had his father William Harwood, and he also served as its representative in the Virginia Revolutionary Conventions, and the Virginia House of Delegates as would his second son Edward Harwood. However, the devastations of war and poor farming practices led to Warwick County's depopulation after the conflict (as Harwood's eldest son William took his family and one of his sisters to what became Shelbyville, Kentucky), and reduced political activity by Harwood family members.

Dr. Humphrey Harwood Curtis, Jr. acquired the property before the American Civil War and was one of two doctors in Warwick County. In 1861, he organized a volunteer infantry company of 80 members known as the Warwick Beauregards to protect local interests, and served as its captain. That unit ultimately saw action in 13 battles of that war as part of the 32nd Virginia Infantry Regiment. During this time he also allowed Confederate troops to use the property as a field hospital during the April 1862 Battle of Dam Number One (part of the Peninsula Campaign, and a month before the inconclusive Battle of Williamsburg).

Warwick County was acquired by the City of Newport News in the 1950s, and the city acquired this property in 1995. The post Civil War addition to the house was torn down, and the lost chimney rebuilt so as to make the building reach its 1860 appearance. Although it also now hosts some living history re-enactments about the American Revolutionary War, the site is now officially known as "The Civil War at Endview: A Living History Museum". Visitors to the house museum can tour the four interior rooms, which portray a collection of medical supplies, a standard parlor, Union soldier gear, and a bedroom, although re-enactors are only present at special events.

The property has been used for once-a-year Civil War Reenactments, and has recently restarted reenactments of the Siege of Yorktown on a bi-annual basis. As of Spring 2023, operating hours have been cut back so that the site is open to the public Thursday through Saturday, with additional closings during the Winter.

== Media ==
Endview Plantation was featured on Only in America with Larry the Cable Guy in the episode "America After Dark". Self-proclaimed "redneck" comedian Larry the Cable Guy visited the plantation with Southeast Virginia Paranormal Investigations, a local paranormal team and joined them in investigating the house. The group could not declare the house haunted however, they did gather evidence of possible paranormal activity, such as EVP's of several strange noises and ghost voices on their digital recorders.

== See also ==
- Warwick County, Virginia
- Warwick Beauregards
