= Samuel Matthews (captain) =

17th-century English planter and politician in colonial Virginia

Captain Samuel Mathews (c. 1580 – November 30, 1657) was a Virginia planter, political figure, and the father of Governor Samuel Mathews (Colonial Virginia governor). Also known as Colonel Mathews, the elder Samuel became one of the most prominent men in the colony.

== Biography ==
His Majesty's Public Record Office records Captain Samuel Mathews arriving at Jamestown on the ship Southampton in 1622 with 23 servants, and living at the 'At ye Plantaccon oer agt James Cittie' in February 16, 1623. He established a plantation, Mathews Manor (later known as Denbigh), which was located on the north side of the James River at its confluence with the Warwick River in the area which later became Warwick County, Virginia (and which is now within the city limits of Newport News). He eventually had several other land holdings, including one near Henricus and another at Old Point Comfort.

By 1623 he was a member of the Virginia Governor's Council and was actively involved in conflicts with the Native Americans, leading a force against the Tanx (Weyanoke) Powhatan Indians. In 1624 he was one of the commissioners appointed by the King to enquire into the condition of the colony.

Frances Grevill was one of four women who arrived at Jamestown from Bristol, England in September 1620 aboard the ship, Supply. She was first married to Lieutenant Colonel Nathaniel West, brother of Thomas West, 3rd Baron De La Warr, who had been Governor of Virginia beginning in 1610. After West's death 24 February 1623, Grevill married Abraham Peirsey, a wealthy man who had purchased Sir George Yeardley's Flowerdew Hundred Plantation. Peirsey died shortly later, on 16 January 1628. Twice widowed, but with considerable legacies, she next married Samuel Mathews around 1629.

They had two sons, Samuel Jr. (1630–1660) and Francis (1632–1673). Francis, a tobacco planter, had a large estate of some two thousand acres in Northumberland County.

In 1630, Colonel Mathews was commissioned to (re)build a fort at Point Comfort, at the location of Fort Algernon and modern-day Fort Monroe.

Greville died around 1633, leaving Mathews and the two young sons. In 1635, Colonel Mathews was one of the leaders of the popular mutiny that ousted Royal Governor Sir John Harvey. In the spring of 1637 Mathews was sent home to England to stand trial for treason in the Court of Star Chamber along with John West (governor), John Utie, and William Peirce, but the charges were eventually dropped and Mathews returned to Virginia in 1639. He resumed service on the Virginia Governor's Council until 1644.

In later life, Mathews returned to England to serve in London as the Colony's representative in handling disputes, particularly in the matter of establishing the border with Maryland. While there, he married Sarah Hinton, the daughter of Sir Thomas Hinton, whose adult son was a Gentleman of the King's Privy Chamber. Much of his political influence has been attributed to this second marriage, and his position in London certainly helped his son in Virginia, who was appointed governor there in 1656. Mathews died in London on November 30, 1657.

As a member of the House of Burgesses, Mathews was viewed as an "honest, energetic and faithful servant of the Colony" whose death was "universally lamented."

== Mathews Manor ==
Captain Mathews built the Manor around 1626. The site of Mathews Manor, located within the independent city of Newport News, Virginia, was the subject of an archeological study led by Colonial Williamsburg's Ivor Noel Hume in the 1960s, and was placed on the National Park Service's National Register of Historic Places.

== See also ==
- Colony of Virginia
- Samuel Mathews (colonial Virginia governor) (son)
- History of Virginia
- Denbigh Plantation Site
