= William Harwood (councillor) =

Virginia soldier, landowner and politician

Member of the Virginia Governor's Council
- In office 1620-1622

Member of the House of Burgesses for Martin's Hundred, Colony of Virginia
- In office 1625-1628 Serving with John Jackson, Ellis Emerson
- Preceded by: Robert Addams
- Succeeded by: Thomas Fawcett

Personal details
- Born: c. 1589 Lincolnshire, England
- Died: After 1635 England
- Parent(s): Sir George Harwood, Catherine Phesant Harwood (probable)
- Relatives: Thomas Harwood (nephew)
- Education: in England
- Occupation: officer, planter, politician

William Harwood (c. 1589-after 1635) became a soldier, landowner and politician in the Colony of Virginia.

Harwood arrived in 1620 to Virginia, on the ship Francis Bonaventure. He was associated with Martin's Hundred, even called "governor" by the Virginia Company of London.

Harwood and survived the massacre of 1622, but was recalled to Britain in 1635.
