= Digges (surname) =

Digges is a surname. Notable people with the surname include:

- Cole Digges (burgess) (1691-1744), colonial Virginia merchant, planter and politician
- Deborah Digges (1950–2009), American poet and teacher
- Dudley Digges (c. 1583–1639), English politician
- Dudley Digges (actor) (1879–1947)
- Dudley Digges (burgess), colonial Virginia merchant, planter and politician, father of Cole
- Dudley Digges (patriot) (1728-1790), attorney, planter, military officer, politician and patriot in Virginia
- Dudley Digges Jr. colonial Virginia attorney and politician
- Edward Digges (1620–1674), Governor of Virginia, British barrister, planter and politician
- Leonard Digges (scientist) (1520–1559), mathematician and surveyor
- Leonard Digges (writer) (1588–1635), poet and translator
- Robert Digges Wimberly Connor (1878–1950), American historian and archivist
- Thomas Digges (1546–1595), English mathematician and astronomer
- Walter M. Digges (1877–1934), American lawyer, judge and politician from Maryland
- West Digges (1720–1786), English actor
- William Digges (1651–1697), Colonial Virginia planter and politician, son of Edward
