= Dudley Digges (disambiguation) =

Sir Dudley Digges (1583–1639) was an English diplomat and politician.

Dudley Digges may also refer to:

- Dudley Digges (writer) (1613–1643), English Royalist political writer; son of the above
- Dudley Digges (burgess) (1665–1711), Warwick County, Virginia merchant, planter and politician
- Dudley Digges Jr. (1694–1768), Goochland County, Virginia attorney, merchant, planter and politician
- Dudley Digges (patriot) (1728–1790), York County, Virginia attorney, planter, and military officer
- Dudley Digges (actor) (1879–1947), Irish stage and film actor
