= William Digges (burgess) =

American politician

Member of the House of Burgesses for Warwick County, Colony of Virginia
- In office 1752–1771 Serving with William Harwood
- Preceded by: John Langhorne
- Succeeded by: William Langhorne

Personal details
- Born: c. 1721 Virginia
- Died: 1784 Virginia
- Spouse(s): Frances Robinson (b. 1729); Elizabeth Wormeley
- Relations: Edward, Dudley Digges (patriot) (brothers); Dudley Digges (burgess) (grandfather); Edward Digges(great-grandfather)
- Parent(s): Cole Digges, Susanna Power
- Occupation: planter, politician, soldier

William Digges (c. 1721—1784) was a planter and politician in the Colony of Virginia, who represented Warwick County, Virginia in the House of Burgesses from 1752 until 1771.

== Early and family life ==
The second son born to the former Elizabeth Foliott Power and her planter and burgess husband Cole Digges, was born to the First Families of Virginia. His father would serve for decades on the Virginia Governor's Council (following service in the lower house of the Virginia General Assembly, the House of Burgesses, where many ancestors and cousins had served). His great uncle, also William Digges, had served on the Maryland Proprietor's Council after representing York County in the Virginia House of Burgesses (and founded the Maryland branch of the family which also included members of the same name and which intermarried with this branch).

On the maternal side, his grandfather Dr. Henry Power practiced medicine and his great-grandfather John Power was a "Spanish merchant" (presumably trading Virginia tobacco and other products with Spain or its colonies) and his other great-grandfather Rev. Folliott had a parish which merged with Williamsburg's parish. His elder brother Edward Digges inherited their ancestral home of Bellfield Plantation in York County, and represented that county in the House of Burgesses before moving westward and leaving that plantation in the care of his eldest son (also William Digges, 1742–1804, who would marry this man's daughter Elizabeth and represent Warwick County in the Virginia House of Delegates). Their eldest sister Mary (1717–1744) married Nathanial Harrison of Brandon plantation slightly upstream on the James River and their sister Susannah in 1739 married Major Benjamin Harrison, son of Nathaniel Harrison of Wakefield plantation.

== Career ==
Like his father, uncles and grandfather, Digges was a planter. He used enslaved labor to operate Denbigh plantation in Warwick County. Following the conflict, he submitted claims for supplying fodder, corn and beeves to the French and Continental armies. In 1783, he and his son (or nephew through his brother Dudley) Cole owned 44 titheable Blacks and 43 young enslaved, as well as 21 horses, 102 cattle, a stud horse and a carriage. Their holdings were second largest number of enslaved people in Warwick county, exceeded only by 55 Blacks and 66 young enslaved, 17 horses, 3 cattle, a carriage and a coach owned by Wilson Miles Cary, with Richard Cary and Edward Harwood also owning significant numbers of enslaved in that Tidewater County. Probably reflecting his demise, in 1785, only Mariah, Beck and Metne were listed as owned by him in Warwick County (as well as untitheable, although a horse and two cattle were taxed).

During the colonial period Digges also served as a justice of the peace in Warwick County, and as a vestryman of Warwick parish. Warwick County voters first elected him as one of the burgesses representing their small county in 1752, and re-elected him and William Harwood until 1772, when William Langhorne succeeded him.

Digges experienced financial problems after the American Revolutionary War, particularly since his main plantations were near the final fighting at Yorktown in 1781, and probably worn out from years of nutrient intensive tobacco farming. Also, he may have wished to provide dowries for his daughters. While residing at Mayfield Cottage upstream in Dinwiddie County in 1783 and 1784, Digges advertised for overseers to operate Denbigh Plantation. In November 1784, he advertised Mayfield plantation, described as including 400 acres, for sale. The following year, William Digges Jr. and Dudley Digges Jr. advertised for sale between 600 and 800 acres near "New-Port-News", possibly Denbigh plantation.

== Personal life ==
This William Digges married twice. His first wife, Frances Robinson, the daughter of Major Anthony Robinson and his wife Diana, bore at least two sons, Cole and William.

Complicating matters, his brother Dudley Digges (patriot) also had a son named Cole Digges (patriot) (1748–1788), who like this man's son (his cousin) served as an infantry officer in the American Revolutionary War. His brother Edward Digges (burgess) also had a son named Cole (1744–1777), who died in the revolutionary war, and a son named William Digges (patriot) (1742–1804). These same-named first cousins may cause genealogies to become confused.

According to the modern genealogist John Dorman, their firstborn son Cole Digges (1754–1817) served as a cavalry major in the Revolutionary War and member of the House of Delegates before moving westward to Hanover County, while his brother William remained in the Newport News area even after selling Denbigh plantation in 1787 following this man's death. Of their daughters, Susanna married William Cole, Frances did not marry, Elizabeth married her cousin William Digges, Mary married William Hill of Newport News and Lucy married John Walton of Northampton County. However, the much earlier genealogist Lyon Gardiner Tyler claims the eldest brother Edward never married and this man moved to Fauquier County and had sons William, Dudley, Thomas and Edward in Fauquier County.

== Death and legacy ==
Digges died, probably in late 1784, and his burial place is now unknown. In 1787, Dr. William Young purchased part of Denbigh plantation in Warwick County from William Digges, probably this man's nephew and son-in-law. for the next century and a half it remained in the hands of Young descendants (who defended it against invading British troops in the War of 1812 and bought the rest of the property in 1813). Young descendants continued to operate it during the Civil War and the development of Newport News as a shipping terminal, although part had become a city farm by 1961 and in 1963, shortly after Warwick County was merged into the independent city, a redevelopment authority purchased Denbigh and developed as residential housing neighborhood after archeological excavations.

== See also ==
- Denbigh Plantation Site
- Mayfield Cottage
