= Edward Digges (burgess) =

Virginia merchant, planter, and politician (1716 – 1769)

Member of the House of Burgesses for York County, Colony of Virginia
- In office 1736-1752 Serving with John Buckner, William Nelson, Thomas Nelson
- Preceded by: John Holloway
- Succeeded by: Dudley Digges

Personal details
- Born: 1716 E.D. plantation, York County, Virginia, Colony of Virginia
- Died: March 22, 1769 (aged 52–53) York County, Colony of Virginia
- Spouse: Anne Harrison
- Children: 13 including William(1742-1804), Cole Digges (1744-1777), Edward Digges Jr. (1746-1818), Thomas Digges (1750-1818), Dudley Digges (1760-1842); Mary Digges Fitzhugh (1748-1848) and Sarah Digges Fitzhugh (1757-1817)
- Parent(s): Cole Digges, Elizabeth Folliott Power
- Relatives: Edward Digges(great grandfather)
- Occupation: planter, politician

Edward Digges (1716-March 22, 1769) was a Virginia merchant, planter and politician who represented York County in the House of Burgesses.

== Early life ==
This Edward Digges was the firstborn son of the former Elizabeth Foliott Power and her planter and burgess husband Cole Digges. He was named to honor his great-grandfather Edward Digges, who emigrated to Virginia and served for decades on the Virginia Governor's Council, as would this boy's father after serving in the lower house of the Virginia General Assembly, the House of Burgesses. Many ancestors, relatives and descendants served in the House of Burgesses. His great uncle, William Digges, had served on the Maryland Proprietor's Council after representing York County in the Virginia House of Burgesses, then selling the E.D. plantation he had inherited as eldest surviving son to his youngest brother Dudley (this man's grandfather). That William Digges then founded the Maryland branch of the family which also included members of the same name and which intermarried with this branch, members of whom also intermarried. This man's birth family included two younger brothers who also served as burgesses, William (who inherited their mother's family property in nearby Warwick County) and Dudley (who succeeded this man as one of York County's burgesses and not only outlived this man but also served through the Revolutionary War). In any event, this man received an education appropriate to his class (in the First Families of Virginia) and firstborn status, perhaps including at the College of William and Mary in Williamsburg, but most of those records were subsequently lost, and the Edward Digges recorded as having attended was either his namesake son or Dudley Digges Jr.'s son.

== Career ==
He inherited his great-grandfather's plantation (renamed Bellfield or Bellefield) from his father, and in turn bequeathed it to his eldest surviving son, William, who married his cousin Elizabeth and inherited another of his grandfather's plantations, Denbigh in Warwick County, through that marriage. Both plantations were farmed using enslaved labor.

This Edward Digges began his public career in 1734 by accepting appointment as a justice of the peace for York County. He also served as an officer of the county militia, being named lieutenant colonel of horse and foot also in 1734. He would rise to the position of County Lieutenant in 1748. York County voters elected him as one of their representatives in the House of Burgesses in 1736 and re-elected him until 1752, when his youngest brother Dudley succeeded him. In the mid-1750s, his sons including Edward Jr. moved westward to then-vast Stafford County, from which other counties were created (including Fauquier County in 1759).

== Personal life ==
In 1739 he married Anne Harrison (d. 1775), who bore 13 children. Many died as infants, including their first two sons named Edward, before their first surviving son (and ultimately primary heir) William (1742–1804). The other sons who reached adulthood were Cole Digges (1744–1777, who probably was the boy of that name expelled from the College of William and Mary in 1756 who died in Williamsburg shortly after beginning his public career as burgess for Warwick County as well as volunteering as a military officer in the patriot cause), Edward Digges Jr. (1746–1818, who married Elizabeth Gaskins and lived in Fauquier County), Thomas Digges (1750-1818 who also lived in Fauquier County) and Dudley Digges (1760–1842, who settled in Louisa County after his Revolutionary War service). Their daughters Mary Digges Fitzhugh (1748–1848) and Sarah Digges Fitzhugh (1757–1817) both married Fitzhugh brothers of Fauquier County); Elizabeth Digges Powell (b. 1752) married Dr. Thomas Powell of rural Spotsylvania County but died in York County. Because his brothers also named sons Cole, Thomas, Dudley and William, and Warwick and York Counties were depopulated after the Revolutionary War because of conflict-related damage as well as increasingly infertile land due to farming practices of the era, considerable genealogical confusion has resulted.

== Death and legacy ==
This Edward Digges apparently died in March 1769 at an advanced age for his era, and survived by his widow as well as several children. His trustee (or the trustee of his son Edward Digges Jr.) Thomas Nelson Jr., in 1785 advertised for sale that part of the family's plantation in Warwick County containing 741 acres and 400 acres on the York River two miles from Yorktown, including his mansion house and part of the land producing the famous E.D. tobacco.
