= Edward Digges =

American politician and barrister (1620 – 1674/75)

Governor of Virginia
- In office 1655–1656
- Preceded by: Richard Bennett
- Succeeded by: Samuel Mathews

Member of the Virginia Governor's Council
- In office 1654–1674

Personal details
- Born: 14 February 1620 Chilham Castle, Kent County, England
- Died: 15 March 1674/75 Bellfield Plantation, York County, Colony of Virginia
- Spouse: Elizabeth Page
- Relations: Sir Dudley Digges (father), Edward Digges, Cole Digges, Dudley Digges (grandsons); Cole Digges (great grandson)
- Children: 6 sons and 7 daughters, including William Digges, Dudley, Edward Digges Jr.
- Occupation: planter, politician

Edward Digges (14 February 1620 – 15 March 1674/75) was an English barrister and colonist who became a premier tobacco planter and official in the Virginia colony. The son of the English politician Dudley Digges represented the colony before the Virginia Company of London and the royal government, as well as served for two decades on the colony's Council of State. Digges served as interim Colonial Governor of Virginia from March 1655 to December 1656, and for longer periods as the colony's receiver general and auditor-general. He is also known for planting mulberry trees and promoting the silk industry in the colony.

== Early life and education ==
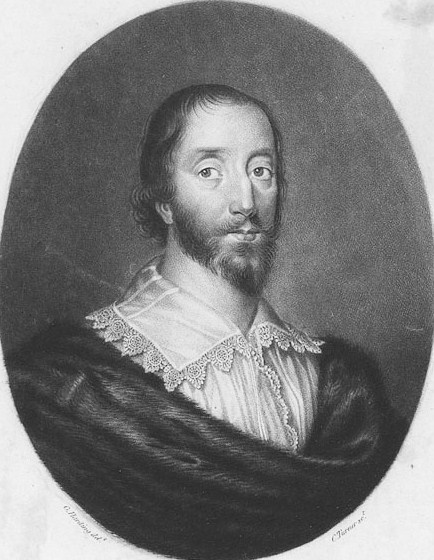
Edward Digges' father, Sir Dudley Digges

Born in Chilham Castle, Kent, England, and christened in Chilham parish on 29 March 1620, Edward Digges was the fourth son of Sir Dudley Digges (1583–1638) and his wife Mary Kempe (1583–?). Sir Dudley was the Master of the Rolls for King Charles I and an investor in the Virginia Company of London. On 13 June 1621, that company gave Sir Dudley a patent, and on 10 June 1622 he was identified as holding the patent for a particular plantation in Virginia, but this son would not arrive in Virginia for another two decades.

Edward Digges received an education appropriate to his class and entered Gray's Inn in 1637 to become a barrister.

== Career ==
Digges emigrated to the Virginia Colony about 1650 and purchased from Captain John West a 1250-acre plantation in Hampton Parish, York County, Virginia, near Yorktown. Digges also patented land in Surry, New Kent and Gloucester counties. About 1653, Digges laid out Fort Mattapony near Walkerton, King and Queen County, Virginia.

=== Tobacco planter ===
Edward Digges had more success growing premium tobacco than manufacturing silk. He grew a sweet-scented tobacco variety which brought an unusually high price in London, and which he exported in casks marked "E.D.".

=== Silk production experiments ===
Digges attempted to revive silk production in Virginia. Others had previously attempted silkworm cultivation on mulberry trees, in response to King James's interest in the subject. However, these early efforts had not succeeded, so others showed little enthusiasm for the project. Digges, in contrast, became deeply absorbed in his project, and brought over two Armenians (now considered the first Armenians in America) to help him experiment with silk production. Digges even wrote a pamphlet entitled "The Reformed Virginia Silkworm", in which he claimed that "native silkworms could be kept outdoors on native mulberry trees and that Indians could be employed to care for the worms."

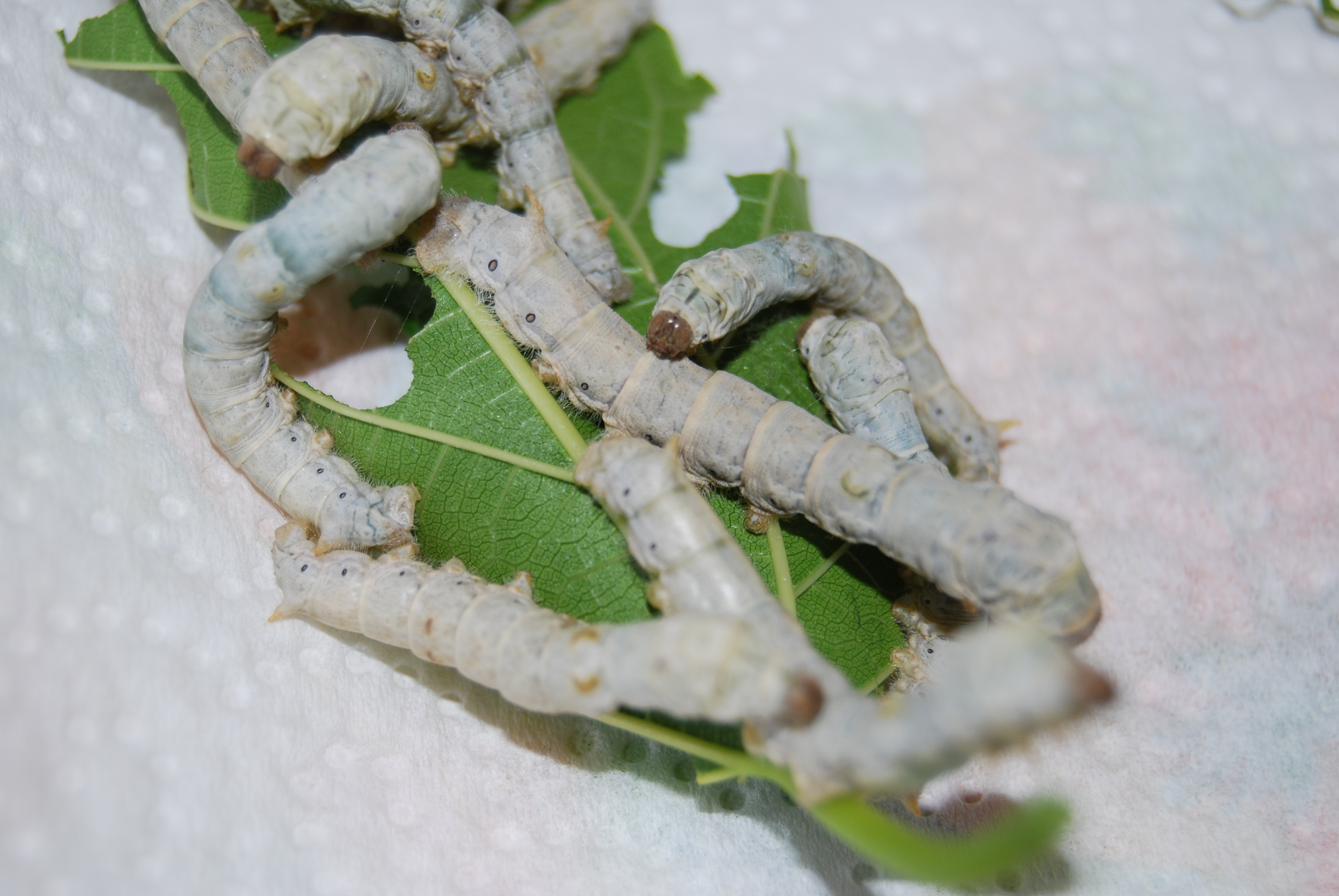
Silkworm Larvae

Digges sent a parcel of his silk to the Royal Society, by way of his cousin Dudley Palmer, one of the original Fellows of the Society. The letter accompanying the silk sample, stated his findings, for example:

Our Country of Virginia is very much subject to Thunders : and it hath thundered exceedingly when I have had worms of all sorts, some newly hatched; some halfway in their feeding; others spinning their Silk; yet I found none of them concerned in the Thunder, but kept to their business, as if there had been no such thing.

Digges's efforts to create a silk industry in Virginia proved futile, despite him being awarded £100 as a reward. By 1656 the Virginia Assembly had become disillusioned with silkworms, and passed the following terse act:

WHEREAS the act for mullberrie trees seemes rather troublesome and burthensome then any waies advantageous to the country, It is hereby enacted, That the said act for planting mullberrie trees shall be repealed and made void.

To this day numerous mulberry trees, which were used to raise the silk worms, still stand on what had been his plantation. In recognition of his efforts, as discussed below, Edward Digges was given a seat on the Virginia Governor's Council (also known as the "Council of State") in November 1654, for "having given a signal testimony of his fidelity to this colony and commonwealth of England."

=== Politician ===
Digges received his seat on the Virginia Governor's Council during the English Civil War, two years after Virginia's governor and legislature recognized the Cromwellian (or Parliamentarian) government. During the absence of Virginia Governor Richard Bennett (who had considerable interest in the Maryland colony as well) but sailed for England to meet Oliver Cromwell), the Virginia General Assembly selected Digges as Colonial Governor of Virginia. After serving from 30 March 1655 until December 1656, Digges informed the House of Burgesses that he intended to sail for England on family business. For his gubernatorial service Digges received a salary of 25,000 pounds of tobacco, paid from duties levied on vessels and marriage license fees. In December 1656, legislators selected Samuel Mathews as governor to replace Digges, and later negotiated with former governor (and royalist) William Berkeley to re-assume that office. Meanwhile, legislators appointed Digges as the colony's agent to England. Thus he met with English merchants and others about the price of tobacco, and sought to secure other rights of the colony. When he sailed in March 1657, Digges took a letter from the House of Burgesses to Oliver Cromwell, who had been ruling England since 1653 to settle the long pending controversy between the Colony and Lord Baltimore of the Maryland colony.

== Marriage and family ==
Coat of Arms of Edward Digges

Edward Digges married Elizabeth Page, daughter of Francis Page (1595-1678), who according to a tomb inscription bore six sons and seven daughters. She survived her husband by more than a decade. Five children survived their parents. The daughter of a burgess and sister of Col. John Page of Middle Plantation, she had been raised at "Bedfont" plantation in Middlesex County. Her niece, Mary Page, married Col. Chiles, Speaker of the House of Burgesses.

The six Digges children who survived to adulthood:

1. William Digges (c. 1651 – 24 July 1697) served in the House of Burgesses as well as in local offices. He married Elizabeth Wharton, step-daughter of Lord Baltimore, and had ten children.
2. Dudley Digges (burgess) (1664 – 18 Jan 1710) served in both houses of the Virginia General Assembly. He married Susannah Cole (1674 – 1708), daughter of Col. William Cole of Bolthorpe by his first wife, and produced four children:
  1. Cole Digges (burgess) (1691-1744)
  2. Edward Digges (who died in Woodford, England in 1711)
  3. Dudley Digges Jr. (1694-1768)
  4. A daughter, Elizabeth
3. Mary (– 1690/91); she married her first cousin Francis Page, and had a daughter Elizabeth, who in turn married a first cousin (John Page) and died in 1702, aged 19, leaving two children (John and Elizabeth), both of whom died without issue.
4. Anne (– 1686); she became the second wife of Col. William Cole (member of the Governor's Council) of Bolthorpe in Warwick County, Virginia. They had two sons, both of whom died in childhood, although her husband remarried and the son of his third wife, the former Martha Lear, was William Cole who represented Warwick County alongside Cole Digges mentioned above.
5. Edward; he shared in the 1692 division of his mother's estate, but died unmarried and without issue.
6. Catherine (1654–1729); she lived in New Kent, Virginia, and married three times. She produced 3 sons (Edward, James, and William Herndon).

== Death and legacy ==
Digges died in 1675. His widow (and sole executrix under the terms of his will dated 28 August 1669, and proved 16 June 1675) survived him by 16 years, and occupied the property until her demise, in addition to receiving 1200 pounds sterling under the terms of the will. A large tombstone marks his grave near his home at Bellfield Plantation, inscribed as follows:

To the memory of Edward Digges Esq. Sonne of Dudley Digges of Chilham in Kent Kn t & Bar t Master of the Rolls in the rain of K. Charles the First. He departed this life 15th of March 1674 in the LIII d year of his age, one of his Mag ty Councill for this his colony of Virginia. A gentlemen of most commendable parts and ingenuity, the only introducer and promoter of the silk manufacture in this colony. And in everything else a pattern worthy of all Pious Imitation. He had issue 6 sons and 7 daughters by the body of Elizabeth his wife who of her conjugal affection hath dedicated to him this Memorial.

Digges' will left legacies "to all my children being four boys and four girls", although only sons William, Dudley and Edward II, and a granddaughter would survive their mother.

During Bacon's Rebellion not long after his death, Mrs. Digges and her eldest son William Diggs suffered losses because of family loyalty to the King, and William fled to the Maryland colony, where he held offices as well as property before returning to Virginia.

The plantation which Digges had purchased from Capt. John West (known as the E. D. plantation) remained in the family until 1787, when it was sold. It was known as "Bellfield" by 1811, when it was advertised for sale as "Belfield, 1.000 acres in York Co., the only estate where the famous E.D. tobacco was raised, which never failed to bring in England one shilling when other tobacco would not bring three pence." It is currently under federal control as part of the Naval Weapons Station Yorktown.

== See also ==
- Virginia

Government offices
| Preceded by Richard Bennett | Colonial Governor of Virginia; 1655–1656 | Succeeded by Samuel Matthews |
