= Dudley Digges House =

Dudley Digges House may refer to:

- Williamsburg Bray School a 1760-1774 school for free and enslaved Black children in Williamsburg, Virginia.
- Dudley Digges House (Yorktown), a historical house Yorktown, Virginia damaged during the 1781 Siege of Yorktown
