= William Digges (patriot) =

American platner and politician (1742–1804)

Member of the Virginia House of Delegates for Warwick County, Virginia
- In office 1790-1802 Serving with Richard Cary, John Burnham, Richard McIntosh
- Preceded by: Richard Cary
- Succeeded by: John Jones

Personal details
- Born: December 29, 1742 E.D. plantation, York County, Virginia, Colony of Virginia
- Died: 1804 (aged 61–62) Elizabeth City County, Virginia
- Spouse: Elizabeth Digges (cousin)
- Children: 4 daughters
- Parent(s): Edward Digges (burgess), Anne Harrison
- Relatives: Cole Digges (cousin); William Digges (uncle and father-in-law), Cole Digges (grandfather)
- Education: College of William and Mary
- Occupation: planter, military officer, politician

William Digges (December 29, 1742 – 1804) was a Virginia planter and politician who represented now-defunct Warwick County, in the Virginia House of Delegates (1790-1802). Although genealogists disagree as to his father, he was the grandson of Cole Digges who helped found Yorktown. The other related men of the same name were:

- His great uncle William Digges (1650-1697) who represented York County before moving to Maryland and serving in both houses of that province's legislature.
- His uncle and father-in-law William Digges (burgess) (1721-1784) who represented Warwick County for decades before the American Revolutionary War
- His first cousin William Digges, son of William Digges (burgess), also associated with Denbigh Plantation in Warwick County.

Because this man married his cousin, and the naming conventions of the day did not restrict "Jr" to a son (but could be used for a younger relative of the same name), this man appears to be the William Digges Jr. who represented York County in the final Virginia Convention alongside his uncle Dudley Digges (patriot), and then in the first session of the Virginia House of Delegates where he joined Corbin Griffin.
