= William Cole (immigrant) =

Virginia burgess in 1629

Member of the House of Burgesses for Nutmegg Quarter, Colony of Virginia
- In office 1629 Serving with William Bentley
- Preceded by: position created
- Succeeded by: Joseph Stratton

Personal details
- Born: c. 1598 Essex England
- Died: before 1664 Colony of Virginia
- Spouse: Frances
- Relatives: William Cole (councillor) (son); William Cole (burgess)(grandson)
- Occupation: planter, politician

William Cole (b. c. 1598 -- d. before 1664) emigrated from Essex, England to the Colony of Virginia in 1618, and in 1629 was one of the two men who represented Nutmeg Quarter (which later became part of Warwick County) in the House of Burgesses.

== Early life ==
Cole was the eldest son of Humphrie Cole and his wife Hester of Tillingham in Essex, England.

== Career ==
Cole sailed to Virginia aboard the Neptune in 1618. The muster roll of 1624/1625, shows his wife as Frances who had emigrated to the colony aboard the Susan around 1616, and was slightly older than he (27 years old vs. 26) and that 26 year old Roger Farbrace and/or 27 year old Francis Cole lived with them. His relation to George Cole who was killed when Native Americans attacked Edward Bennett's plantation on March 22, 1622, and with John Cole and William Cole who sailed for Virginia aboard the Margaret with their passage paid for by the Society of Berkeley Hundred's investors is unknown, and both those probably died soon after arriving in Virginia. Virginia authorities sent back to England in May 1625 a list which credited this man with planting 50 acres in Elizabeth City, Virginia. Cole died some time before September 15, 1664, when 100 acres of land he had patented (based on immigrants for whose passage he had paid) in Accomack County (on Virginia's Eastern Shore), escheated and was assigned to another man.

== Disambiguating his descendants ==
His son William Cole (1638-1694) may be the family's most distinguished member, representing clients as a lawyer at least since 1670, purchasing the 1350 acre Boldrup plantation (also known as Bolthrope) on the Warwick River in 1671, serving on the Virginia Governor's Council from 1674/75 (including as Governor Berkeley's agent during Bacon's Rebellion) until (near his death) in 1692, and co-founding the College of William and Mary. His son William Cole (this man's grandson) also served in the House of Burgesses, representing Warwick County in the early 18th century. The next probable descendant who served in the legislature was Roscow Cole who represented James City County in the mid-19th century.
