= William Cole (burgess) =

Member of the House of Burgesses for Warwick County, Colony of Virginia
- In office 1715–1728 Serving with Cole Digges, James Roscow, Nathaniel Hoggard, William Roscow
- Preceded by: William Harwood
- Succeeded by: William Harwood

Personal details
- Born: 1692 Boldrup Plantation, Warwick County, Colony of Virginia
- Died: 1729 (aged 36–37) Charles City County, Colony of Virginia
- Spouse: Mary Roscow
- Parent(s): William Cole (councillor), Martha Lear
- Relatives: William Cole (immigrant)(grandfather)
- Occupation: planter, politician

William Cole (1691–1729) was a planter and politician who represented Warwick County in the House of Burgesses (1715–1728).

== Early and family life ==
Born to the former Martha Lear in 1692, he was descended from the First Families of Virginia. Both his father William Cole and his maternal grandfather John Lear were on the Virginia Governor's Council (sometimes known as the Council of State). His mother was his father's third wife, and married Council member Lewis Burwell after his father's death. His father had two sons by his second wife, Ann Digges, the daughter of former Councillor Edward Digges, but both appear to have died before attaining legal age (John at about 8 years old). He also had an elder half-sister Susanna (daughter of his father's first wife) who married Council member Dudley Digges (burgess), but died when this boy was a child.

This boy also had not yet reached legal age when his father died, so he was placed under the guardianship of burgess Nicholas Curle of nearby Elizabeth City County, who arranged for his education.

He may have been named to honor his father (probably the family's most distinguished member), or his immigrant grandfather William Cole who in 1629 served as a burgess for Nutmegg Quarter, a predecessor of Warwick County.

He married Mary Roscow, the daughter of burgess William Roscow (d. 1700), who bore several children, none of whom carried on their family's political involvement. Their sons included John Cole (named in the will), William Cole (named as underage in the will and who died circa 1750), Rev. Roscow Cole of Warwick Parish (who died in 1755) and James Cole (who moved to Goochland County and died in 1770). Their daughters Martha and Jane both survived multiple well born husbands. Martha married Thomas West, then Ferdinando Leigh of King William County. Jane Cole married Nathaniel Claiborne, then Stephen Bingham of King William County and finally Francis West. This man's widow remarried in 1738 to Thomas Wills.

== Career ==
By 1714, Cole had reached legal age, and he received a contract to construct warehouses at Swineyards in Charles City County (further upstream on the James River from Warwick County), and gave a bond with John Stith as security. Cole served as justice of the peace, sheriff and coroner of Warwick County. In 1721 Cole was deputy receiver-general as well as a colonel of the Warwick County militia.

Warwick County voters elected Cole as one of their representatives in the House of Burgesses in 1715, and re-elected him until 1728.

== Death and legacy ==
The date of his death is unrecorded, but his will executed in October 1729 was admitted to probate in November 1729. He gave all his Goochland County lands to his sons John (who had also been the heir of his uncle James Roscow Esq.), Roscow and James Cole, and his son William Cole III also received an enslaved boy named Lewis. His widow received enslaved people Will and Sarah, which she had brought to the marriage as dower. None of his sons (who like him presumably had guardians) served in the colony's legislature, much less reached the highest level, as had his father and maternal grandfather. Boldrup plantation was owned by Judge Richard Cary (who married this man's daughter Mary) after the American Revolutionary War, and their descendants never lived at Boldrup, but instead used overseers. The next probable descendant who served in Virginia's legislature was Roscow Cole who represented James City County in the mid-19th century.
