= William Digges =

American politician

Member of the Maryland Proprietary Council
- In office 1677–1689

Member of the House of Burgesses for York County, Colony of Virginia
- In office 1676 Serving with John Page
- Preceded by: Robert Baldry
- Succeeded by: John Page

Personal details
- Born: c. 1651 Virginia
- Died: 24 July 1697 Virginia
- Spouse: Elizabeth Sewell (m. 1681)
- Relations: Dudley Digges (burgess) (brother), Cole Digges (burgess) (nephew),William Digges (burgess) (great-grandnephew)
- Children: 10
- Parent(s): Edward Digges (father), Elizabeth Page
- Occupation: Planter; soldier; politician

Colonel William Digges (c. 1651—24 July 1697) was a prominent planter, soldier and politician in the Colony of Virginia and Province of Maryland.

The eldest son of Edward Digges (1620-1674/5), who sat on the Virginia Governor's Council for two decades but died shortly before Bacon's Rebellion, Digges fled to Maryland where he married Lord Calvert's stepdaughter and served on the Maryland Proprietary Council until losing his office in 1689 during the Protestant Revolution, when a Puritan revolt upset the Calvert Proprietorship. His eldest son Edward sold his primary Virginia plantation to his uncle (this man's younger brother) Dudley Digges. It is now within Naval Station Yorktown.

His former Maryland estate, Warburton Manor, is now within Fort Washington Park. Two additional related men with the same name served in the Virginia General Assembly, both descended from this man's uncle and his grandson Cole Digges (burgess): William Digges (burgess) and his nephew and son-in-law William Digges Jr. both represented now-defunct Warwick County, Virginia (now incorporated into Newport News, Virginia).

== Early life ==
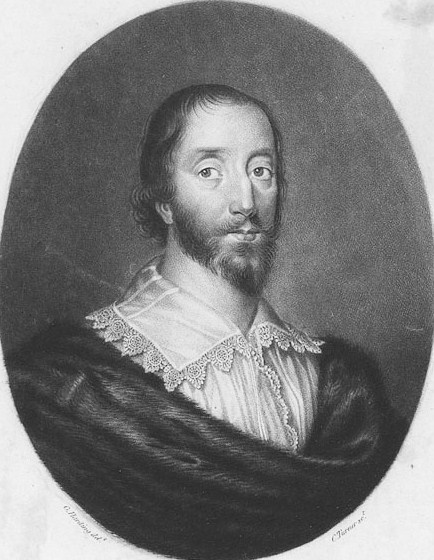
William Digges' grandfather, Sir Dudley Digges

William Digges was born in Virginia in around 1651, the eldest son of Edward Digges (1620-1674/5), an English barrister and colonist who served for two decades on the Virginia Governor's Council, as well as had been the Colonial Governor of Virginia from March 1655 to December 1656. Edward Digges produced premium tobacco branded as "E.D.", as well as invested heavily in planting mulberry trees and promoting the silk industry in the colony. Edward Digges died in 1675, shortly before Bacon's Rebellion. As eldest son, William inherited the "E.D. Plantation", later known as Bellfield.

== Career ==
Coat of Arms of William Digges

William Digges received his inheritance when he was 24 years old, but had begun his public service as justice of the peace in York County when he was 21 (the justices jointly administering the county in that era. He was captain of horse in 1674.

During Bacon's Rebellion, Digges strongly supported Governor Berkeley. In one scuffle with Thomas Hansford, one of Bacon's foremost supporters, Digges severed Hansford's finger, and fearing retribution fled to Maryland. Digges returned to Virginia and was appointed Sheriff of York County in 1679.

In Maryland Digges became a merchant and planter in St. Mary's County. He married Elizabeth Sewall, widow of Dr. Jesse Wharton and a stepdaughter of Charles Calvert, Lord Baltimore, the Proprietor of Maryland. Immediately following his marriage he was appointed to the Governor's Council. He was also appointed Deputy Governor of Maryland. Digges received extensive land and property grants in Maryland, and became the "Lord of Warburton Manor" in Prince George County on the Potomac River. In 1684 he, along with Major Nicholas Sewall, served as Collector of Patuxent River.

During the Protestant Revolution in Maryland in 1689, Digges commanded the Catholic forces at St. Mary's, Maryland. After 1689, having lost his positions, he returned to live in Virginia. On April 20, 1693 a warrant for his arrest was issued, and on April 22, 1693, "Colonel William Digges was examined as to his knowledge of a plot to restore King James to the throne, and was bound over, with his wife, in £1,000 to appear before the next General Court."

== Family life ==
William Digges married Elizabeth (Sewall) Wharton, with whom he had ten children:

- William Digges, married Eleanor (Brooke) Darnall, widow of Philip Darnall
- Charles Digges (1685-1744), married Susannah Maria Lowe, a daughter of Susanna Maria Bennett and Lt. Col. Henry Lowe, and a granddaughter of Richard Bennett. Charles and Susanna had two children, William and Ann Digges (1721-1814). Ann married the planter and politician Dr George Hume Steuart in 1744.
- Dudley Digges
- John Digges, married Mary
- Nicholas Digges
- Jane Digges, married Notley Rozer
- Elizabeth Digges, married Anthony Neale
- Ann Digges, married Henry Darnall II, eldest son of Henry Darnall (1645-1711), Deputy Governor of the Province of Maryland. Henry Darnall II was a wealthy planter.
- Mary Digges
- Catherine Digges (b. 1655), married William Herndon

== Death and legacy ==
William Digges wrote his last will and testament in 1694, bequeathing his Belfield plantation to his firstborn son, with proceeds of his agricultural and milling operations to support his daughters until grown or married, as well as dividing slaves and livestock among his six sons. He died on 24 July 1697, leaving a will which mentioned several large Maryland plantations "and directed that his plantation on the York River be used most advantageously for his daughters." However, the York River plantation was inherited by William's eldest son Edward, who on 21 Sept 1699 sold it to his uncle Dudley, William's younger brother, so he could continue to reside in Maryland.

== See also ==
- Province of Maryland
- Protestant Revolution

== Notes ==
- Browning, Charles Henry, Americans of Royal Descent, Genealogies Showing the Lineal Descent from Kings of Some American Families Clearfield; 7 edition (June 1, 2009) Retrieved 17 July 2018
- Nelker, Gladys P., The Clan Steuart, Genealogical Publishing (1970).
