= Warburton Manor =

Colonial home of the Digges Family

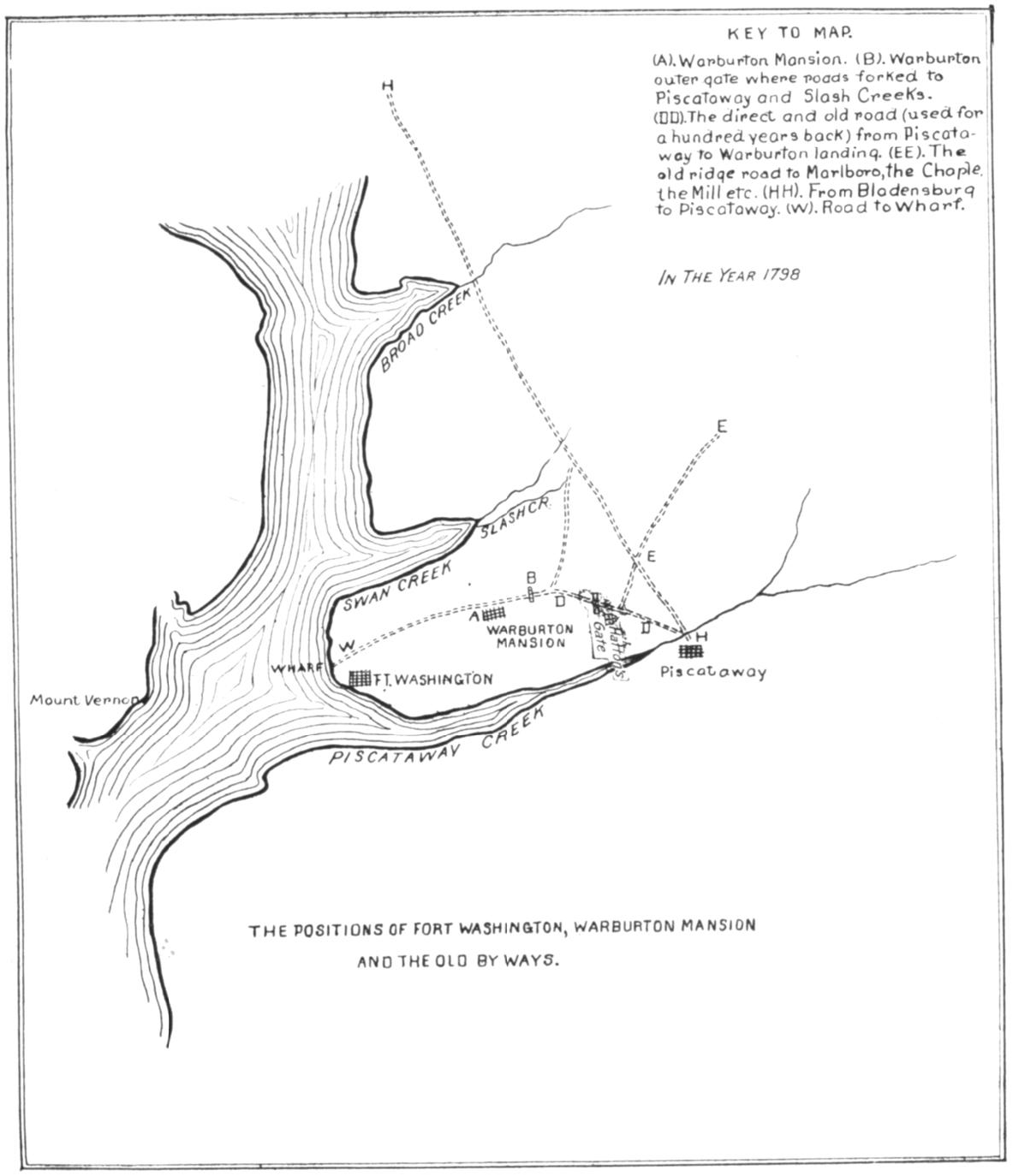
- Map of Warburton Manor prior to its demolition
- Interactive map of the Warburton Manor area

General information
- Type: Manor house
- Architectural style: Colonial
- Location: Prince George County, Maryland, United States
- Coordinates: 38.703°N 77.008°W
- Completed: c. 1661
- Demolished: c. 1814

Technical details
- Structural system: Timber frame

Warburton Manor was the colonial home, patented in 1661, of the Digges Family, descendants of Edward Digges, who was Governor of Virginia from 1652 to 1668. Digges was an intimate friend of George and Martha Washington, who visited the house many times. George Washington spent his forty-third birthday at Warburton Manor. Warburton Manor occupied a strategic site on the Potomac River and today it is the site of Fort Washington, designed by Pierre Charles L'Enfant in 1814.

== See also ==
- Province of Maryland

== Notes ==
- Toogood, Anna, Warburton Manor and the Digges family of Maryland, Division of History, U.S. Office of Archeology and Historic Preservation (1970)
