= Mayfield Cottage =

Historic house in Virginia, United States

- U.S. National Register of Historic Places
- Virginia Landmarks Register
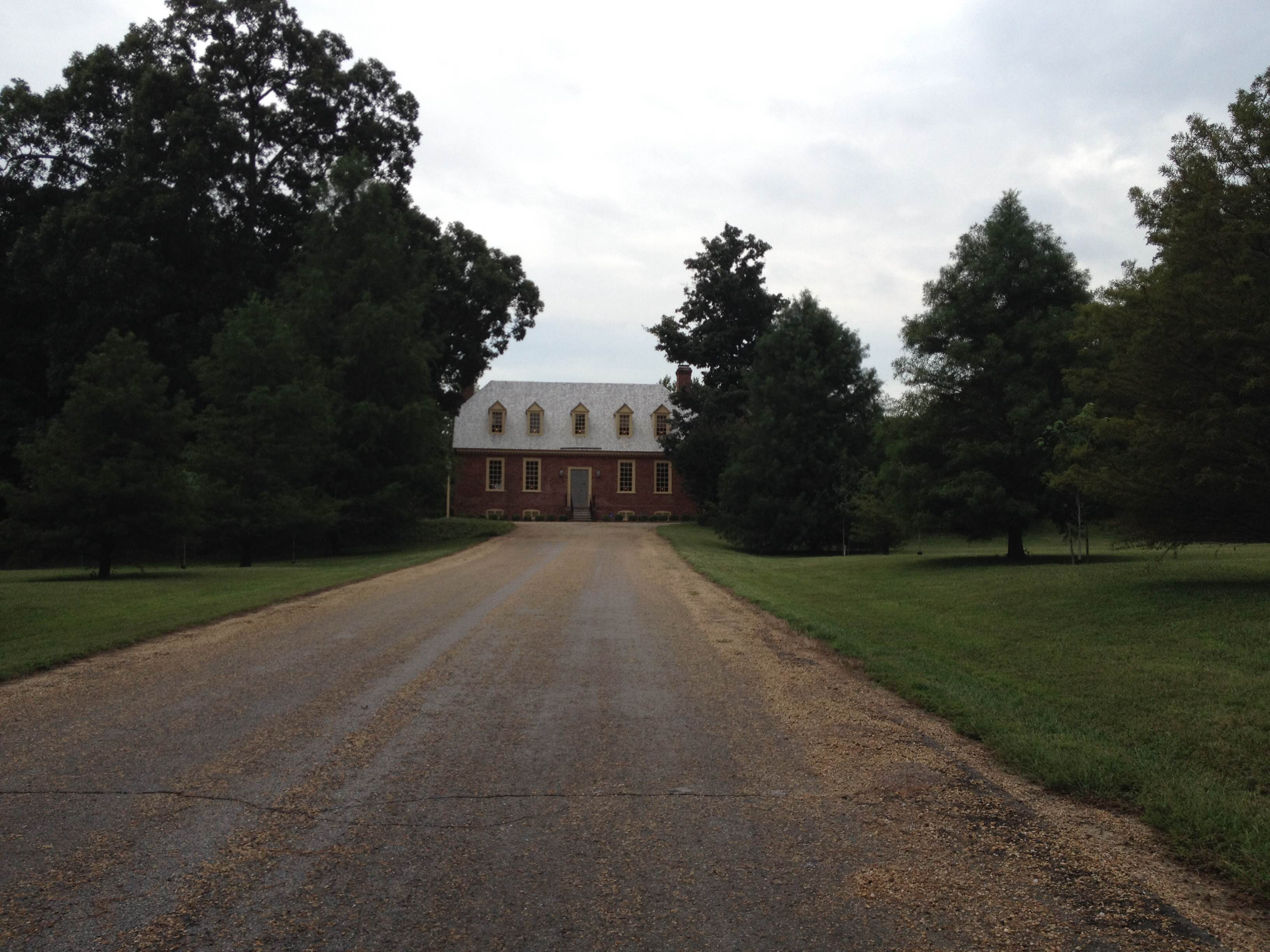

- Location within Virginia Location within the United States
- Location: Central State Hospital Grounds, near Petersburg, Virginia
- Coordinates: 37°12′50″N 77°26′52″W
- Area: 4.7 acres (1.9 ha)
- Built: c. 1750
- Architectural style: Colonial
- NRHP reference No.: 69000236
- VLR No.: 026-0027

Significant dates
- Added to NRHP: November 12, 1969
- Designated VLR: May 13, 1969

Mayfield Cottage is a historic plantation house located near the grounds of Central State Hospital near Petersburg, Dinwiddie County, Virginia. Believed to be the oldest existing brick house in Dinwiddie County, it was built around 1750 and the residence of Robert Ruffin until 1769, when he moved to King William County. From 1885, the property was used by the hospital for its headquarters. The house remained part of the hospital complex until 1969. It was moved from its original site about .5 miles (0.80 km) to the southeast of the present site in 1969.

== History ==
Built about 1750, the 1 1/2-story brick Colonial era mansion features a jerkin-head roof, distinctive interior woodwork, and classic Virginia style Flemish bond masonry.

Shortly after the American Revolutionary War, William Digges Sr. lived at Mayfield and advertised for overseers for his Denbigh Plantation downstream in Warwick County (which near Yorktown was damaged during that conflict). He advertized Mayfield plantation, described as including 400 acres, for sale in November 1784. The following year, William Digges Jr. and Dudley Digges Jr. advertised for sale between 600 and 800 acres near New-Port-News.

Although many Dinwiddie County records are lost, it was owned by Thomas Tabb Bolling who died in 1810. His son Thomas Radford Bolling, who had been born in the house in 1797, probably inherited it. However, in 1816 it was insured by Edward Osborne Goodwyn, who passed it to his sister, who died in 1847 and bequeathed it to her daughter Mrs. Eliza Whitworth Willson. In 1882, Henry Chamberlayne Willson and his wife Eliza sold the house and 290 acres including a granite quarry to the city of Petersburg. In accordance with special legislation passed by the Virginia General Assembly, it was accepted by the board of trustees of the Central Lunatic Asylum as the site of their future hospital.

During the Confederate Army's final attempts to defend Petersburg in 1865, defensive lines Fort Whitworth and Fort Gregg were on Mayfield property, and captured by Federal troops on April 2, 1865.

Although the Mayfield mansion lost some interior partitions in the intervening decades, much of architectural significance remained, although the building itself had been obscured by institutional buildings of the hospital complex until recent times.

Mayfield Cottage was listed on the National Register of Historic Places in 1969.
