= Richard Cary =

American judge

Richard Cary was a lawyer and justice of the Supreme Court of Virginia from Warwick County. He studied law and then practiced in the county courts.

He owned Boldrup Plantation at some point after 1782.

He served in the Fifth Virginia Convention in 1776 and the Virginia Ratifying Convention in 1788.

He married Mary Cole, daughter of William Cole (burgess).

== Judicial career ==
In 1777, he was appointed as a judge of the court of admiralty, where he soon became the presiding judge. As a member of that court, he also became a member of the first Court of Appeals. In 1788, when the Court of Appeals was reorganized to include only five judges elected solely for that court, Crey was appointed a judge on the general court.

== Death ==
He died in 1789.
