= Dudley Digges (writer) =

English political writer (1613–1643)

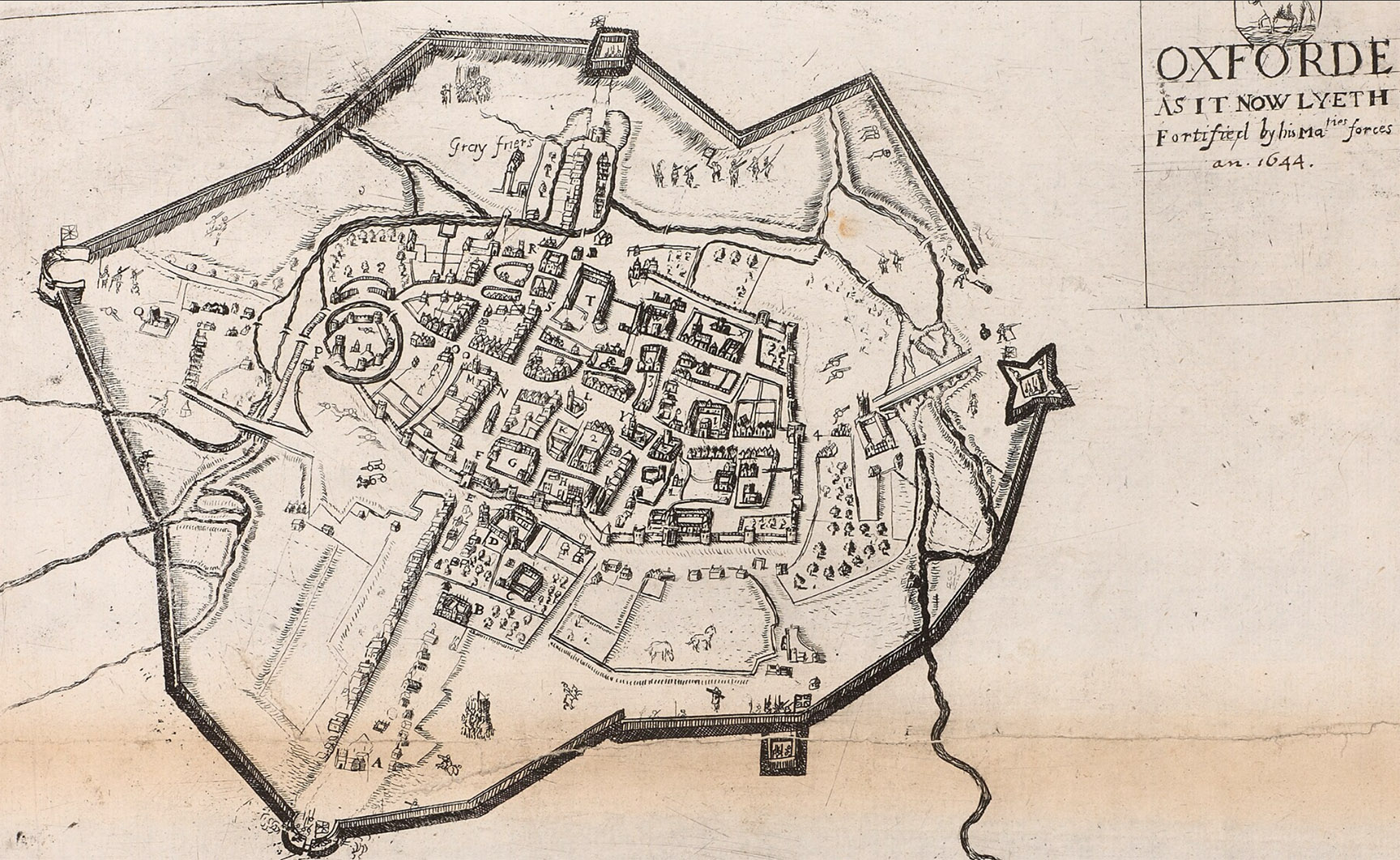
Oxforde as it now lyeth: fortified by his Ma(jes)ties forces, an. 1644

Dudley Digges (1613–1643) was an English Royalist political writer.

== Life ==
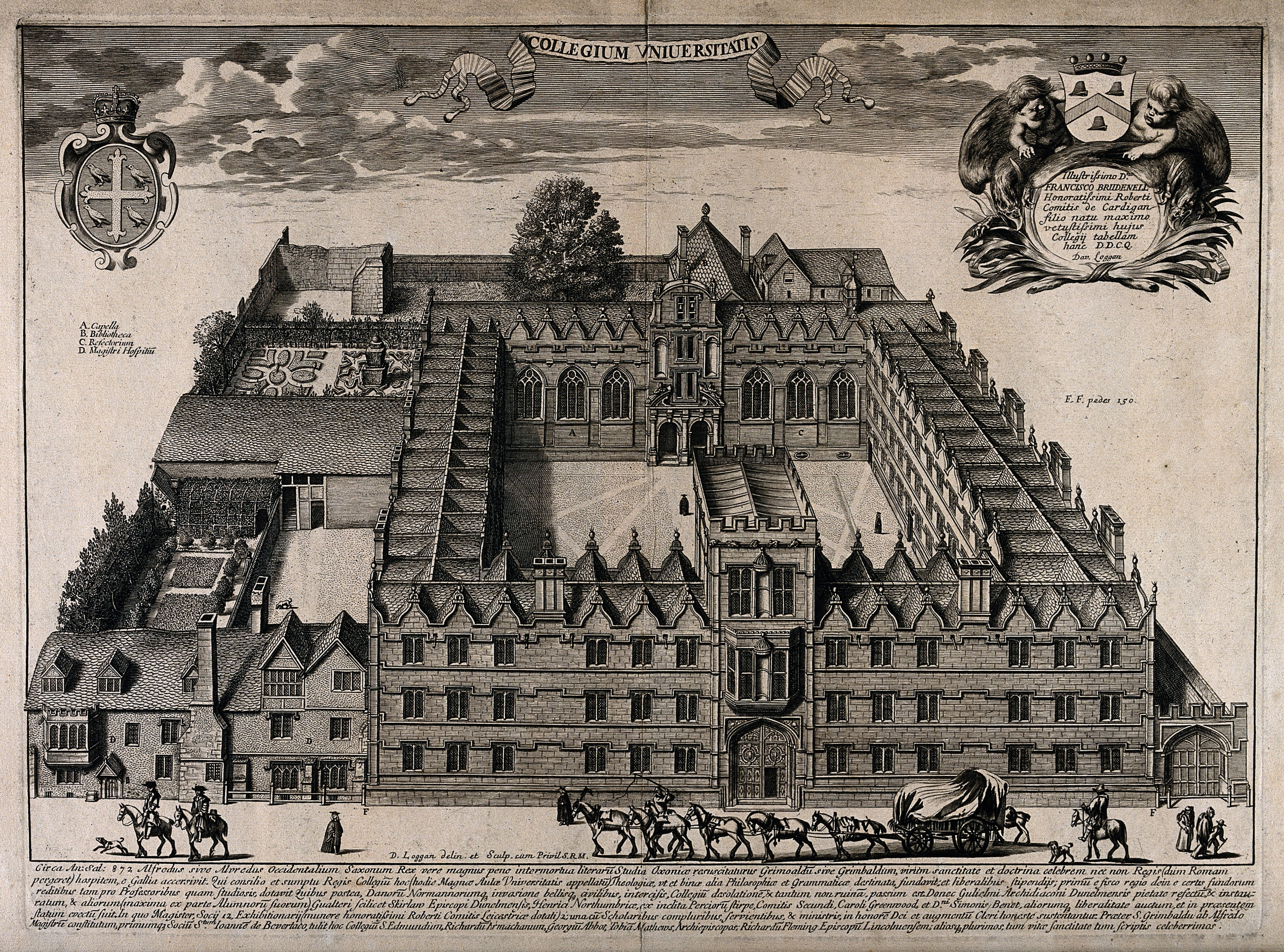
Aerial view of University College, Oxford, with key (c. 1690)

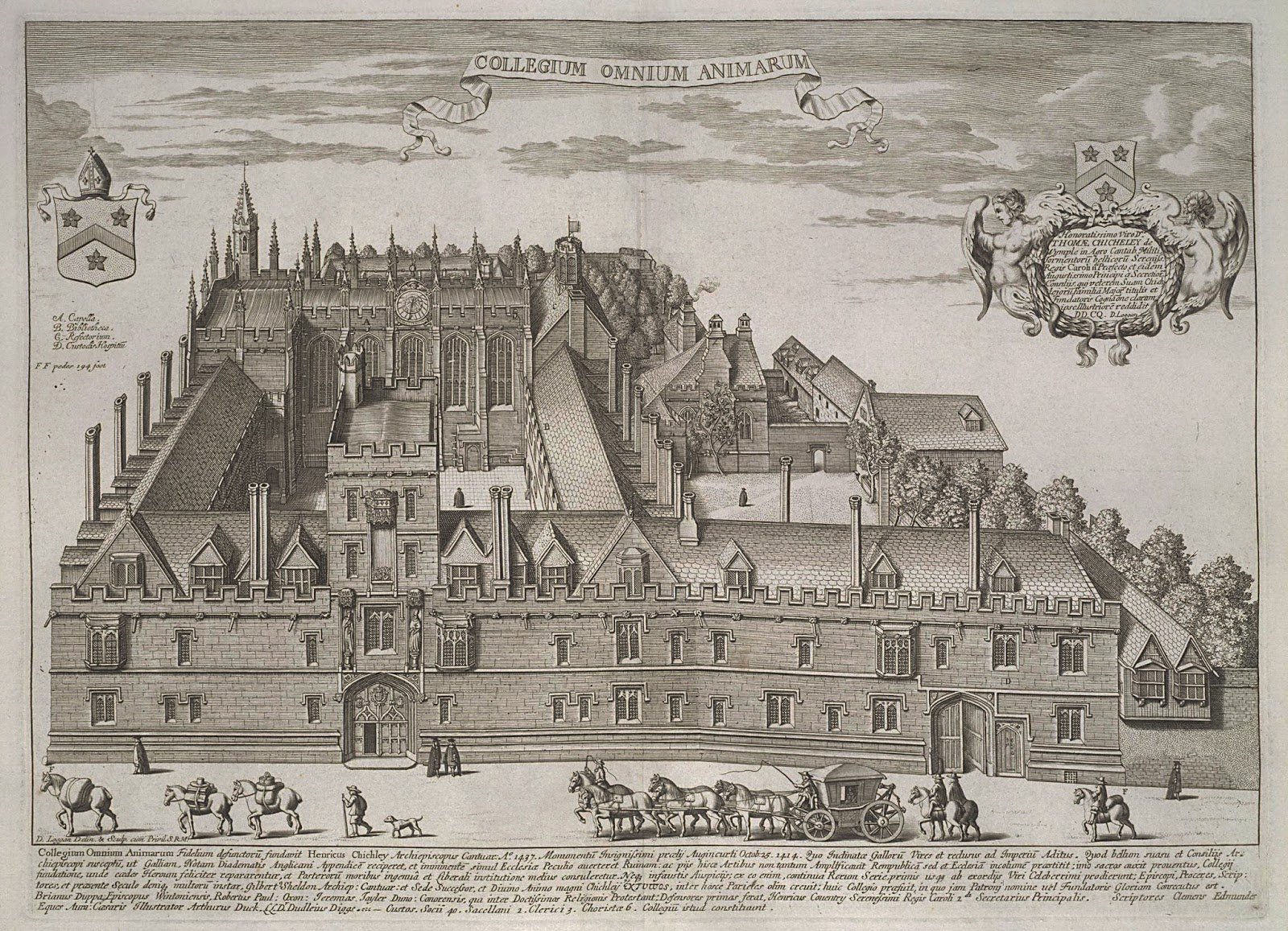
Bird's-eye view of All Souls College, Oxford, looking North (1675)

Dudley Digges was born at Chilham, Kent, in 1613, the third son of Sir Dudley Digges by his wife Mary, daughter of Sir Thomas Kempe of Olantigh, Kent.

He entered University College, Oxford, in 1629, proceeding BA on 17 January 1632 and MA on 15 October 1635. He was elected fellow of All Souls in 1632 or 1633, and in 1637 was incorporated into the University of Cambridge. In 1641 he was entered at Gray's Inn. (Note: Wood, Athenæ Oxonienses, ed. Bliss, iii. cols. 65, 66.)

In September 1642 he is mentioned as one of a "delegacy" appointed to provide means for defending Oxford against the Parliament during the Civil War. (Note: Wood, History and Antiquities of the University of Oxford, ed. Gutch, ii. 447.) He died at Oxford on 1 October 1643 of the malignant camp fever (presumably typhus) then raging there, and was buried in the antechapel of All Souls. He left over a thousand volumes to the college. Anthony Wood described him as "advantaged by a great memory, and excellent natural parts, which he improved by close studying, he became a general scholar and a good poet and linguist". (Note: Wood, Biographia Britannica, iii. 1717–18.)

== Works ==
Digges is remembered as a royalist pamphleteer and political philosopher. He was a devoted Royalist, and all his important writings were in defence of Charles I. In Oxford, he contributed Royalist poems to collections published by the University, including Musarum Oxoniensium and Solis Britannici perigaeum coronæ Carolinæ, both in 1633, and Flos Britannicis versis novissimi filiola Carolæ et Mariæ, in 1637. A poem by him on the Great Frost of 1634 also survives in the Bodleian Library. His other works were:

1. Nova Corpora Regularia, 1634. This is a demonstration of certain mathematical discoveries made about 1574 by his grandfather, Thomas Digges.
2. An Answer to a Printed Book intituled Observations upon some of His Majestie's late Answers and Expresses, Oxford, 1642.
3. A Review of the Observations upon some of His Majestie's late Answers and Expresses, York, 1643.
4. The Unlawfulnesse of Subjects taking up arms against their Soveraigne in what case soever, 1643. This defence of the doctrine of passive obedience was widely popular among the Royalists and went through several editions.

== See also ==
- Diggs baronets
