= Bellfield Plantation =

Historic plantation site in York County, Virginia

Bellefield Plantation
- E.D. Plantation
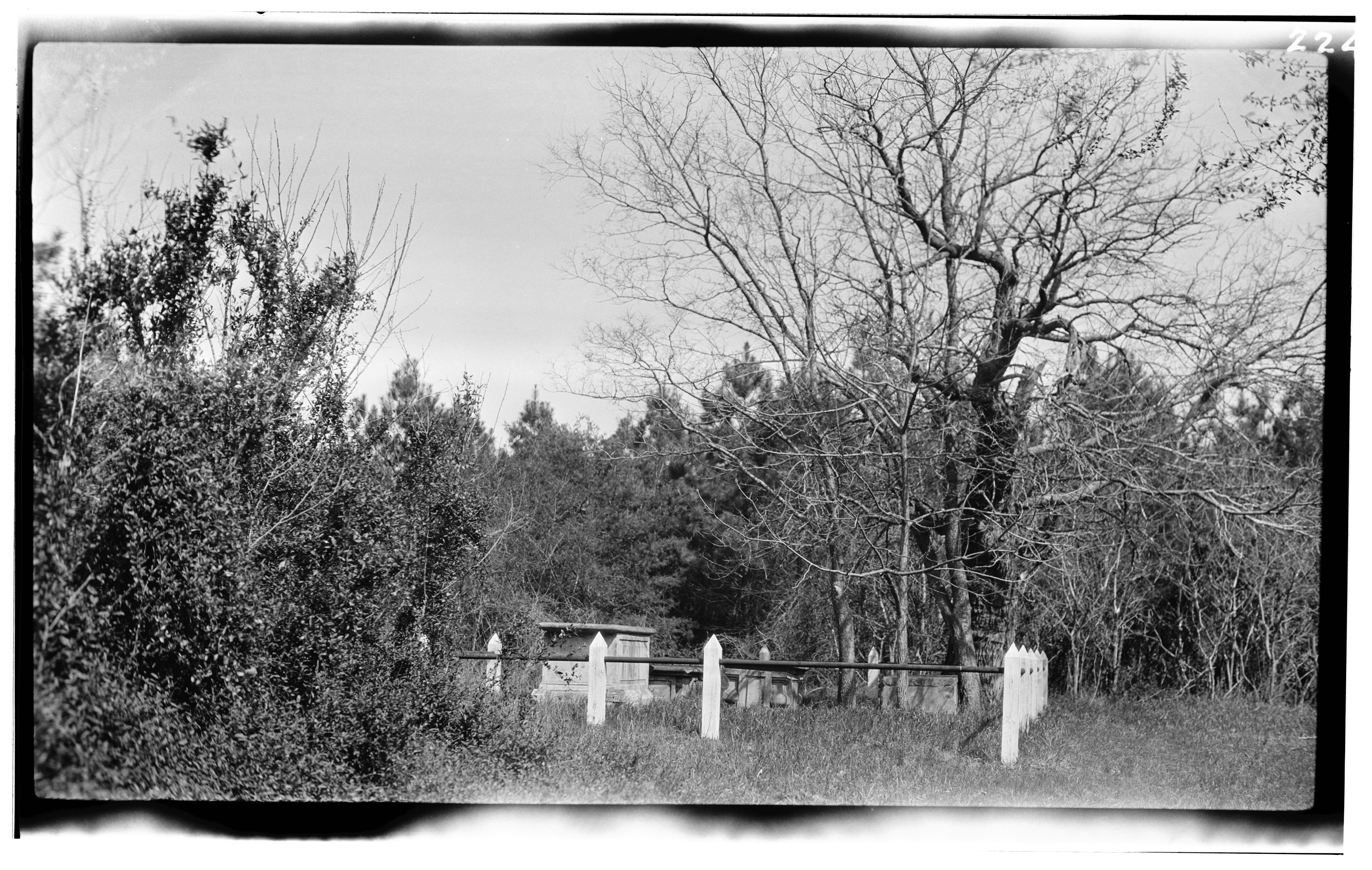
- Interactive map of Bellefield Plantation
- Type: Plantation
- Location: York County, Virginia
- Coordinates: 37°16′22″N 76°34′47″W
- Governing body: National Park Service

Virginia Landmarks Register
- Official name: Bellefield Site & Cemetery
- Reference no.: Candidate Site 099-0002

Bellefield Plantation (or Bellfield, also called E.D. Plantation) is a historic plantation site located in York County, Virginia, United States. In modern times, the former site is located off the Colonial Parkway next to the York River and abuts Naval Weapons Station Yorktown.

In 1630, the Virginia Colony made the decision to plant a settlement on the York River:

"... for the securing & taking in of a tract of Land called ye fforest bordering uppon the cheife residence of ye Pamunkey King the most dangerous head of the Indian enemy ..."

John West (governor) received a land grant for this purpose, 600 acres "on the east side of Felgates". "Felgates" refers to Robert Felgate's 1632 grant of "350 acres lying at Kiskeyacke upon Pamunkey". In 1635 after the "thrusting out" of Governor Sir John Harvey, John West was chosen as temporary replacement, and served until 1637 when Harvey was restored to his position. In 1640, West was ordered to England, along with neighbor John Utie, Samuel Matthews (captain), and William Peirce (burgess) to answer charges in the Star Chamber. All four were eventually cleared, and returned to Virginia.

West sold the original 600 acres, along with adjoining land for a total of 1250 acres to Edward Digges in 1650. It became known as the "E.D." Plantation at this time, and using slave labor, grew in fame for producing luxury tobacco. The plantation remained in the family until 1787, when it was sold.

The Plantation was known as "Bellfield" by 1811, when it was advertised for sale as "Belfield, 1.000 acres in York Co., the only estate where the famous E.D. tobacco was raised, which never failed to bring in England one shilling when other tobacco would not bring three pence." The area would continue to be used for agriculture purposes up until 1918, when the US Navy purchased the land for establishment of Navy Mine Depot, Yorktown (in modern times called Naval Weapons Station Yorktown). In the 1930s as the Colonial Parkway was established, the land was transferred to the National Park Service.

Owners of Bellfield Plantation
Date of acquisition	Owner	Notes
1630	John West (governor)	Virginia Colony land grant
1650	Edward Digges	purchased. Buried in Bellfield's cemetery.
1675	William Digges	inherited
1697	Edward Digges	inherited
September 21, 1699	Dudley Digges (burgess)	purchased (from nephew). Buried in Bellfield's cemetery.
January 18, 1710	Cole Digges (burgess)	inherited. Buried in Bellfield's cemetery.
1744	Edward Digges (burgess)	inherited
1769	William Digges (patriot)	inherited
June 19, 1787	William Waller	purchased
Dec 1815	Scervant Jones	purchased
September 9, 1829	Richard R. Corbin	purchased
March 2, 1830	Robert McCandlish	purchased. Buried in Bellfield's cemetery.
1878	Robert McCandlish (Jr.)	inherited
August 7, 1918	US Navy	purchased
1930s	National Park Service	land transferred

Bellfield Plantation
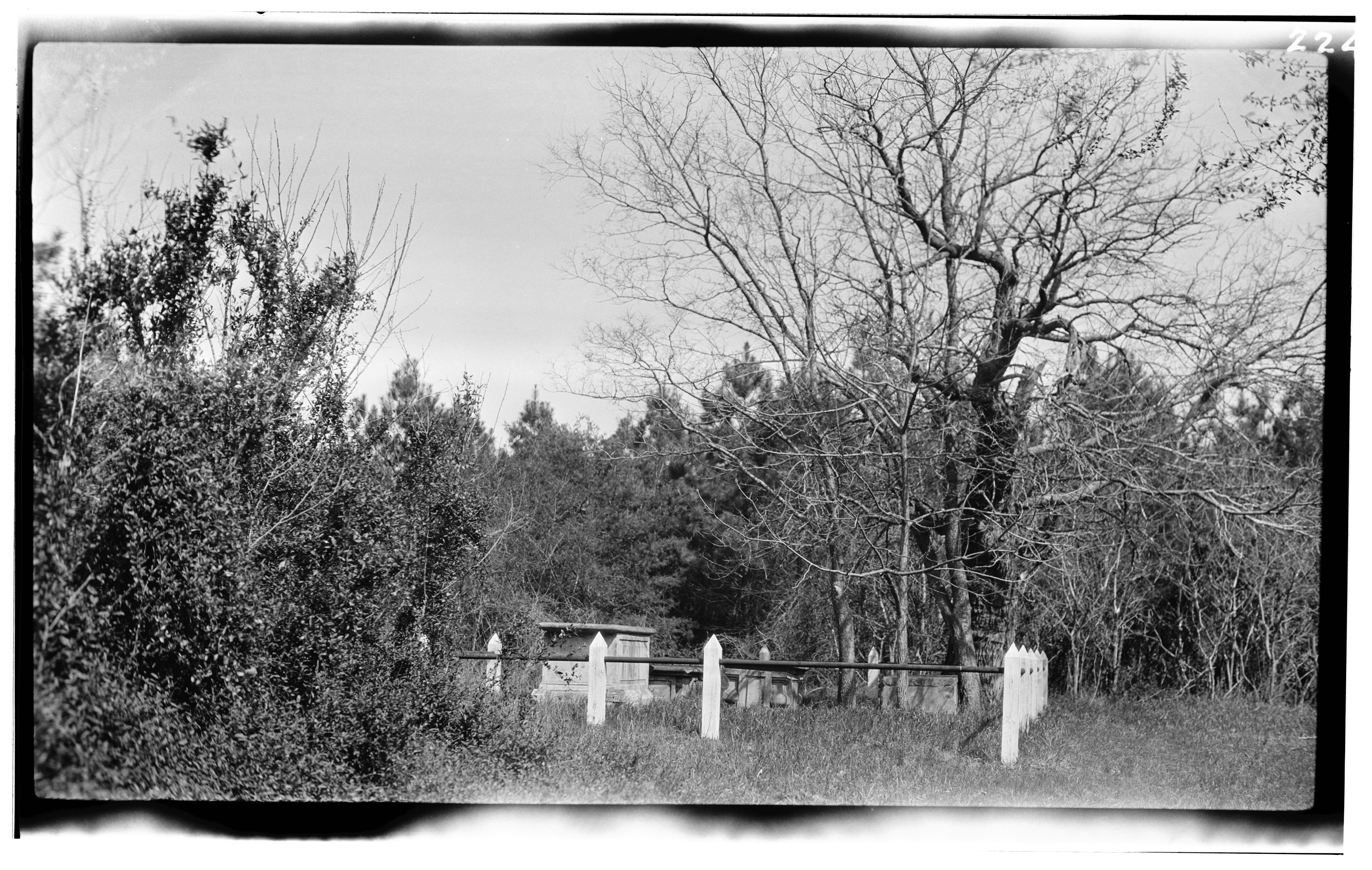
Bellfield Cemetery

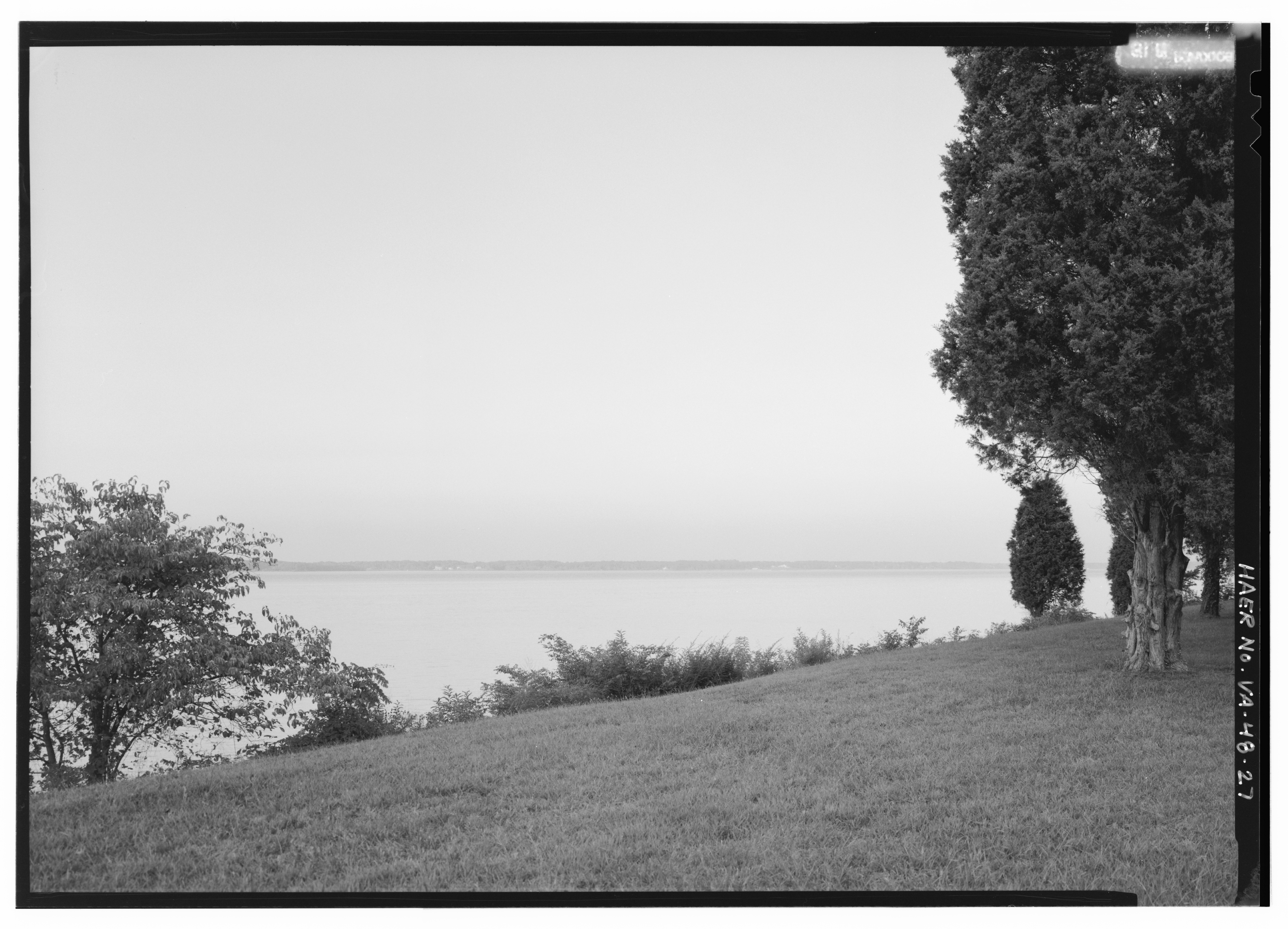
Looking East from Bellfield Plantation Site

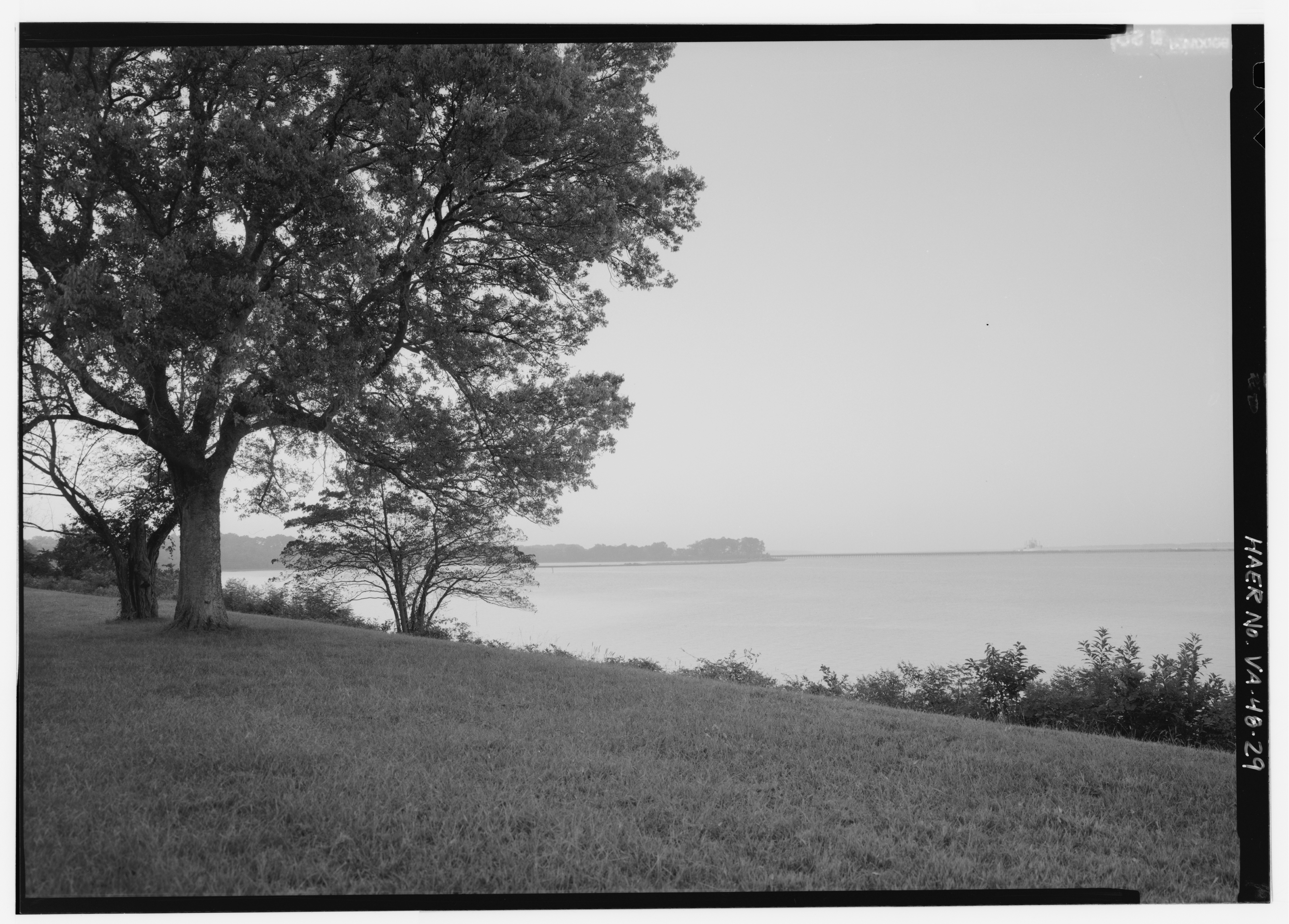
Looking North from Bellfield Plantation Site

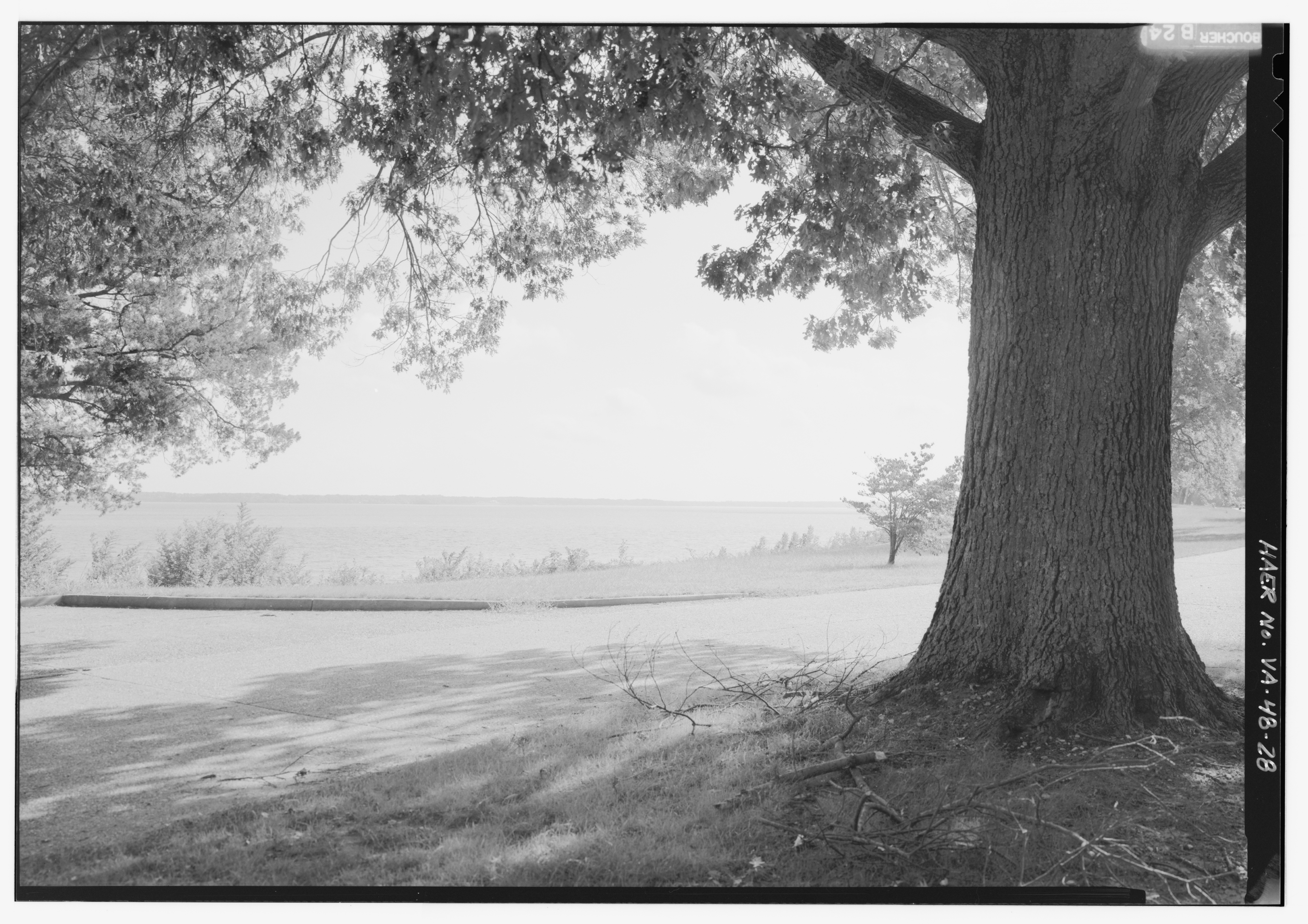
Looking East from Bellfield Plantation Site

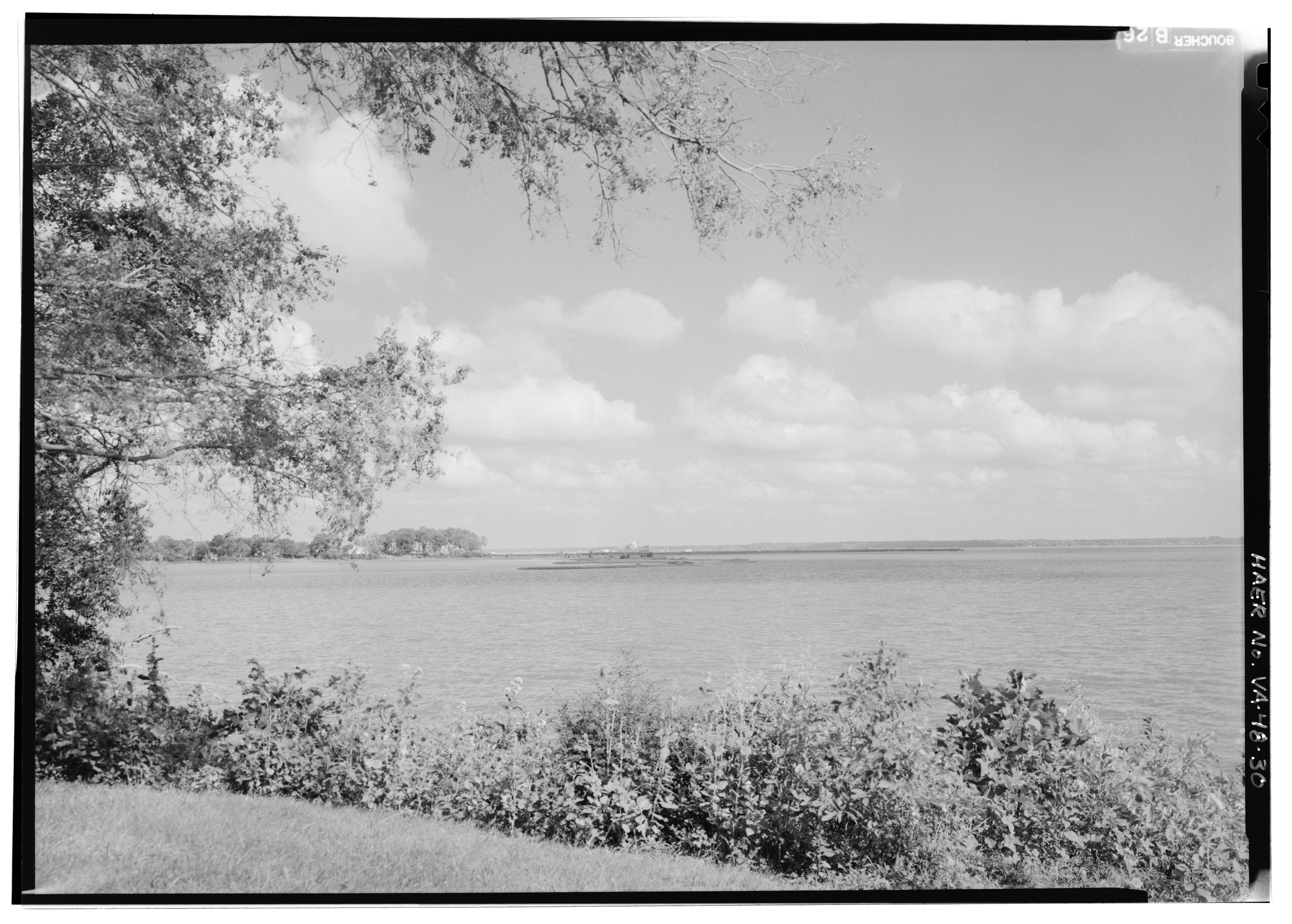
Looking North from Bellfield Plantation Site

== See also ==
- Dudley Digges House (Yorktown)
