= Cole Digges (patriot) =

American planter and politician (1748–1788)

Member of the Virginia House of Delegates for Warwick County, Colony of Virginia
- In office 1778-1784 Serving with Cole Digges, John West, Wilson Miles Cary
- Preceded by: Edward Harwood
- Succeeded by: John Langhorne

Personal details
- Born: 1748 E.D. plantation, York County, Virginia, Colony of Virginia
- Died: 1788 (aged 39–40)
- Spouse: Mary Robinson of Isle of Wight County
- Parent(s): Dudley Digges (patriot), Marthe Burwell Armistead
- Relatives: Cole Digges (grandfather)
- Education: College of William & Mary
- Occupation: planter, military officer, politician

Military service
- Allegiance: Continental Army
- Branch/service: Virginia Militia
- Rank: lieutenant
- Unit: 1st Continental Light Dragoons
- Battles/wars: American Revolutionary War; Battle of Brandywine

Cole Digges (1748–1788) was a Virginia planter, military officer and politician who represented now-defunct Warwick County, in the Virginia House of Delegates (1778–1784) and during the Virginia Ratification Convention of 1788. Possibly the most famous of three related men of the same name who served in the Virginia legislature during the 18th century, and despite genealogical disagreement this man was most likely the son of Dudley Digges of Yorktown and Williamsburg and his first wife, Martha Burwell Armistead. He served during the American Revolutionary War as a dragoon in the Continental Army, rising from the rank of cornet to lieutenant before resigning and starting his legislative career. The other two related men of the same name were his grandfather, Yorktown merchant Cole Digges who served in both houses of the Virginia legislature, and his cousin Cole Digges (d. 1777) who briefly represented Warwick County in the House of Delegates before his death and this man's succession.

== Early and family life ==
Named for his powerful grandfather, Cole Digges, confusion is common because both his uncles also named one of their sons "Cole", creating three cousins with the same name in the same time period and relatively close geography. (Edward Digges (burgess) son Cole (1744-1777) died in revolutionary war shortly after becoming delegate from Warwick County, and William Digges (burgess) son Cole (1754-1817) associated with Hanover County.) This Cole indirectly succeeded to the seat in the Virginia House of Delegates representing Warwick County vacated by the death of his cousin of the same name, although neighbor Edward Harwood actually won the election for that seat, and served alongside this man several additional times.

== Career ==
Digges was a planter, and operated his plantations in James City and Warwick County using enslaved labor. By the 1787 tax census, he owned 33 adult slaves and 35 enslaved teenagers in Warwick County as well as 21 horses, 94 cattle and also owned a riding chaise, and 10 adult slaves, 5 enslaved teenagers, 5 horses and 40 cattle in James City County.

He served in the Virginia House of Delegates, as well as in the Continental Army.

Following the war, he moved from war-damaged Warwick County to Richmond, Virginia, where he built a house that is now known as the Cole Digges House and the headquarters of Preservation Virginia.

Digges ultimately moved again, to Hanover County, Virginia, where he died.
