= Cole Digges (burgess) =

American merchant

Member of the Council of State for the Colony of Virginia
- In office 1720-1744

Member of the House of Burgesses for Warwick County, Colony of Virginia
- In office 1715-1720 Serving with William Cole
- Preceded by: William Harwood
- Succeeded by: James Roscoe

Personal details
- Born: 1691 E.D. plantation, York County, Virginia, Colony of Virginia
- Died: 1744 (aged 52–53) Colony of Virginia
- Spouse: Elizabeth Folliott Power
- Children: Edward, William, Dudley and at least 3 daughters
- Parent(s): Dudley Digges, Susanna Cole
- Relatives: Edward Digges(grandfather)
- Occupation: planter, politician

Cole Digges (1691–1744) was a Virginia merchant, planter and politician who helped establish Yorktown, Virginia, and served more than two decades on the Virginia Governor's Council after representing Warwick County in the House of Burgesses.

Complicating matters, his three sons each named one of their sons after this man (their grandfather), and genealogists disagree as to their respective parentage. One of the three cousins died young circa 1769, the other in 1777 and the last, Cole Digges (patriot) became not only a significant politician like his grandfather and a Revolutionary War officer, but also built the other of the two historic houses in Virginia colloquially named the "Cole Digges House."

== Early life and education ==
The eldest son of prominent planter and politician Dudley Digges(1665–1710) and his wife, the former Susanna Cole (1674–1708). She was the daughter of Captain William Cole, who had a plantation in Warwick County called Denbigh. His name presumably honors that maternal grandfather, whose plantations this man inherited. His birth family included two younger brothers, Edward (who died in England in 1711) and Dudley Digges Jr. (who moved several times as well as married Mary Hubard who bore two sons and three daughters, all of whom died without issue), and a sister Elizabeth. He received a private education appropriate to his class.

== Career ==
Digges inherited the E.D. plantation in York County from his father, as well as plantations in Warwick Counties from his mother. He operated them using enslaved labor.

He became an officer in the local militias, and in September 1728 Digges took the oath required to command the joint militias for Warwick, York and Elizabeth City Counties.

Warwick County voters first elected him as one of the burgesses representing them in the House of Burgesses in 1715, and he won re-election twice before becoming a member of the Virginia Governor's Council, on which he served for decades.

== Personal life ==
Coat of Arms of Cole Digges

Digges married the former Elizabeth Foliott Power (daughter of Dr. Henry Power of York County and granddaughter of Rev. Edward Foliott of Hampton Parish). They had three sons who reached adulthood and served in the House of Burgesses and at least three daughters.

1. Eldest son Edward Digges (burgess) (1716–1769) began public life as a lieutenant in the York County militia in 1734, and also represented the county in the House of Burgesses, but more than a decade after marrying Anne Harrison, moved westward to Stafford County, Virginia. Edward and Anne had thirteen children, of whom two sons became patriots during the American Revolutionary war, as well as legislators like their father and uncles. These included: William Digges (patriot) (1742–1798) who inherited E.D. plantation (renamed Bellfield or Bellefield), Cole Digges (1744–1777), Edward Digges Jr. (1746–1818), Thomas Digges (1750–1818), Dudley Digges (1760–1842), Mary Digges Fitzhugh (1748–1848), Sarah Digges Fitzhugh (1757–1817)
2. Middle son William Digges (burgess) (1721–1784) inherited the Denbigh, became a justice of the peace for Warwick County in 1749 and represented that county as a burgess, as had had this man his father, but for nearly two decades. Most probably his son Cole Digges(d. 1817) became the most distinguished soldier of the family during the American Revolutionary war, as well as a legislator. Their sisters (this man's daughters) Mary (1717–1744) and Susanna (1723–1770) married into the Harrison family of Virginia, another of the First Families of Virginia.
3. Youngest son Dudley Digges (patriot) (1724–1790) succeeded to the York County legislative seat in 1752 and won re-election numerous times until the American Revolutionary War, during which he sided with the patriot cause.

== Death and legacy ==
Digges died in 1744, as did his daughter Mary. The National Park Service restored the Yorktown property he bought in 1713 during the 1960s, but further archeological studies four decades later showed it had been constructed during this man's ownership, and so it is now named the "Cole Digges House" and the business place of Mobjack Bay Coffee Roasters (which also has an outdoor cafe for customers). Also in the 1960s, archeological excavations were undertaken at the former Denbigh and Boldrup plantation before residential and industrial development in what had become Newport News, Virginia. The other historic Cole Digges House is in Richmond, constructed by his grandson Cole Digges (patriot) and the headquarters of Preservation Virginia.
