= Dudley Digges (patriot) =

Virginia politician (1728–1790)

Member of the House of Burgesses for York County, Colony of Virginia
- In office 1752-1776 Serving with John Norton, Robert Carter Nicholas, Thomas Nelson Jr.
- Preceded by: Edward Digges
- Succeeded by: position abolished

Personal details
- Born: 1728 E.D. plantation, York County, Virginia, Colony of Virginia
- Died: June 3, 1790 (aged 61–62) Yorktown, Virginia
- Spouse(s): Martha Armistead; Elizabeth Wormeley
- Children: Cole Armistead Digges and 1 sister, Dudley Wormeley Digges and 4 daughters
- Parent(s): Cole Digges (burgess), Elizabeth Power
- Education: College of William & Mary
- Occupation: attorney, planter, politician

Dudley Digges (1728-June 3, 1790) (or before 1736-May 3, 1790) was a Virginia attorney, planter, military officer and politician who served in the House of Burgesses (1752-1776) and all the Virginia Revolutionary conventions representing York County. Possibly the most famous of three related men of the same name who served in the Virginia legislature during the 18th century, this man was the third son of Yorktown merchant Cole Digges who served in both houses of the Virginia legislature.

== Early and family life ==
The third son born to the former Elizabeth Foliott Power and her husband Cole Digges, he was born in late 1728 or early 1729 at Yorktown, in a house his father had built after purchasing the no. 42 lot in 1713, and which remained in the Digges family until 1784, when this man sold it to David Jameson.

His great-grandfather Edward Digges had established the E.D. plantation (later renamed Bellfield) in York County, where his father was born. He had at least two elder sisters who married into the prominent Harrison family, and elder brothers Edward Digges (who as first born son inherited the Belfield plantation and began representing York County in the House of Burgesses in 1736 but moved to Stafford County) and William Digges (who represented nearby Warwick County as had their father before his elevation to the Council of State). This Digges received a private education appropriate to his class, including studies at the College of William and Mary.

This Dudley Digges married twice. His first wife, the former Martha Burwell Armistead bore at least a son, Cole Armistead Digges (born December 31, 1748-and who married Mary Allen) and a daughter, Martha Armistead ("Patsy") Digges, who survived to married Capt. Nathaniel Burwell. However, the mother died in childbirth. Digges remarried in 1760 to Elizabeth Wormeley (1737-1785), the daughter of prominent landowner Ralph Wormeley of Rosegill plantation, who was on the Virginia Governor's Council with this man's father. They had a son Dudley Wormeley Digges (1765-1839) who moved to Louisa County, as well as daughters Elizabeth Wormeley Digges (who married Dr. Robert Nicholson of Yorktown), Mary Wormeley Digges (who married her cousin Dudley Digges), Lucy Wormeley Digges (who married John Stratton) and Judith Wormeley Digges (who married merchant Andrew Nicholson and moved to Richmond where she died in 1849).

== Career ==
Following admission to the local bar, Digges practiced law. His father and elder sister Mary (who had married Nathaniel Harrison of Brandon plantation in Prince George County) both died in 1744.

In 1749, Digges received his first government position in York County, which includes part of the town of Williamsburg (the other part of the colonial capital is in James City County). In that year Digges became colonel of horse and foot, the local militia which included cavalry and infantry. He also became the county's receiver of military fines. In 1763, he became the county lieutenant, responsible for supplying and overseeing the militia.

In 1752, York County voters elected him to replace his brother Edward Digges as one of their representatives in the House of Burgesses, alongside merchant John Norton, who had replaced Yorktown merchant and planter Thomas Nelson Jr. when that merchant was elevated to the Council of State (the upper house of the Virginia General Assembly). Digges repeatedly won re-election until the last Virginia colonial governor, Lord Dunmore, dismissed the assembly in 1776. Robert Carter Nicholas replaced Norton in the legislative session which began in 1756 and Thomas Nelson Jr. replaced Nicholas as the other York County burgess in 1761, and both he and Digges then continued to win re-election. Digges and Thomas Nelson Jr. represented York County during all five Virginia Revolutionary conventions, from the first session (which began on August 1, 1774) until Nelson's election to the Continental Congress in 1776, when William Digges Jr. replaced Nelson.

By 1773, Digges was a member of the committee of correspondence between the Virginia legislature and those of other counties, alongside Thomas Jefferson, Patrick Henry, Peyton Randolph, Benjamin Harrison, Dabney Carr, Edmund Pendleton, Archibald Cary, Richard Bland, Robert Nicholas and Richard Henry Lee. In 1775, Digges was a member of the York County Committee of Safety.

Fellow legislators elected Digges to the Revolutionary governor's council, and he served as elected lieutenant governor while Thomas Nelson Jr. served as governor during the conflict. However, days before he was to ascend to that office, on June 4, 1781, British raiders captured Digges with several other legislators in Charlottesville. Furthermore, his Yorktown house was heavily damaged during the Siege of Yorktown, making it uninhabitable, so he moved to Williamsburg but also ended his political career.

In the 1788 Williamsburg city tax list, Digges (Diggs) paid taxes on twelve enslaved people and three horses, and his cousin Maria (daughter of his lawyerly uncle Dudley Digges Jr.) owned one slave. By 1787 he also owned 36 adult slaves, 41 enslaved teenagers, 9 horses and 62 cattle in still-developing Louisa County, Virginia.

== Death and legacy ==
According to various accounts, Digges died either in Yorktown, Virginia on May 13, 1790 or the town of Williamsburg on June 3, 1790 (which now seems likely a memorial service). Abingdon Church in Gloucester County, Virginia displays a memorial epitaph. His house in Yorktown and several outbuildings were restored c. 1925 by Mrs. Carroll Paul, formerly of Marquette, Michigan, and in 1960 the National Park Service further restored this man's Yorktown house (which he built c. 1760) (and restored the outbuildings in the 1970s). This should not be confused with the Dudley Digges house in Williamsburg (used for a time as a school that taught both enslaved and free Black children) which was named for his lawyerly uncle Dudley Digges Jr. whose daughter Maria taught there. No last will and testament survives for either man.

== See also ==
- Dudley Digges House (Yorktown)
