= William Cole (councillor) =

Virginian politician (c. 1638 - 1694)

Member of the Virginia Governor's Council
- In office 1675-1692

Personal details
- Born: ca.1638 Warwick River County Colony of Virginia
- Died: March 4, 1694 Boldrup Plantation, Warwick County, Colony of Virginia
- Resting place: Newport News, Virginia
- Spouse(s): 3 including Anne Digges, Martha Lear
- Relatives: William Cole (immigrant) (father); William Cole (burgess)(son)
- Occupation: lawyer, planter, politician

William Cole (c. 1638-March 4, 1694) was a lawyer, planter and government official in the Colony of Virginia. He served decades on the Virginia Governor's Council and briefly as the Colony's Secretary of State. He aided Governor William Berkeley during Bacon's Rebellion but fell out of governmental favor when a letter he had written to former Governor Francis Howard, baron Howard of Effingham, was revealed to Lieutenant Governor Francis Nicholson.

== Early life and education ==
Probably the son of Frances who emigrated from England aboard the Susan in 1616 and William Cole who immigrated two years later and represented Nutmugg Quarter (a predecessor of Warwick County in the House of Burgesses in 1629.

== Career ==
Cole had become a member of the bar and represented clients in the General Court at least since 1670. In 1671, Cole purchased the 1350 acre Boldrup plantation (also known as Bolthrope) on the Warwick River from Lady Berkeley, who had inherited it from a previous husband (Governor William Berkeley by then was her husband).

William Cole was one of three men added to the Virginia Governor's Council in 1674, and remained a Councillor under later governors, but resigned nominally for health reasons shortly before his death) in 1692.

Another man who was added to the Council in 1674 was Nathaniel Bacon, then known as Lady Berkeley's distant relative. As Bacon grew dissatisfied with the governor's management of Native Americans and other matters, William Cole became one of the governor's agents in attempting to conciliate the dissatisfied young man. When Bacon's Rebellion started, Cole was one of the men who fled with Berkeley to Virginia's Eastern Shore.

Cole also was one of the men who helped found the College of William and Mary.

== Death and legacy ==
Cole died on March 3, 1694, and his then-young son William Cole inherited considerable property when he reached legal age, as well as continued the family's planter and political traditions.

Boldrup plantation was no longer owned by descendants by the time of the American Revolutionary War, but an archeological excavation of the site was conducted in the 1980s when the area was developed within the city of Newport News, and the gravestones of this man, his final two wives and some family members were found. His gravestone reportedly remains on display near a sidewalk.

Boldrup Plantation burial site
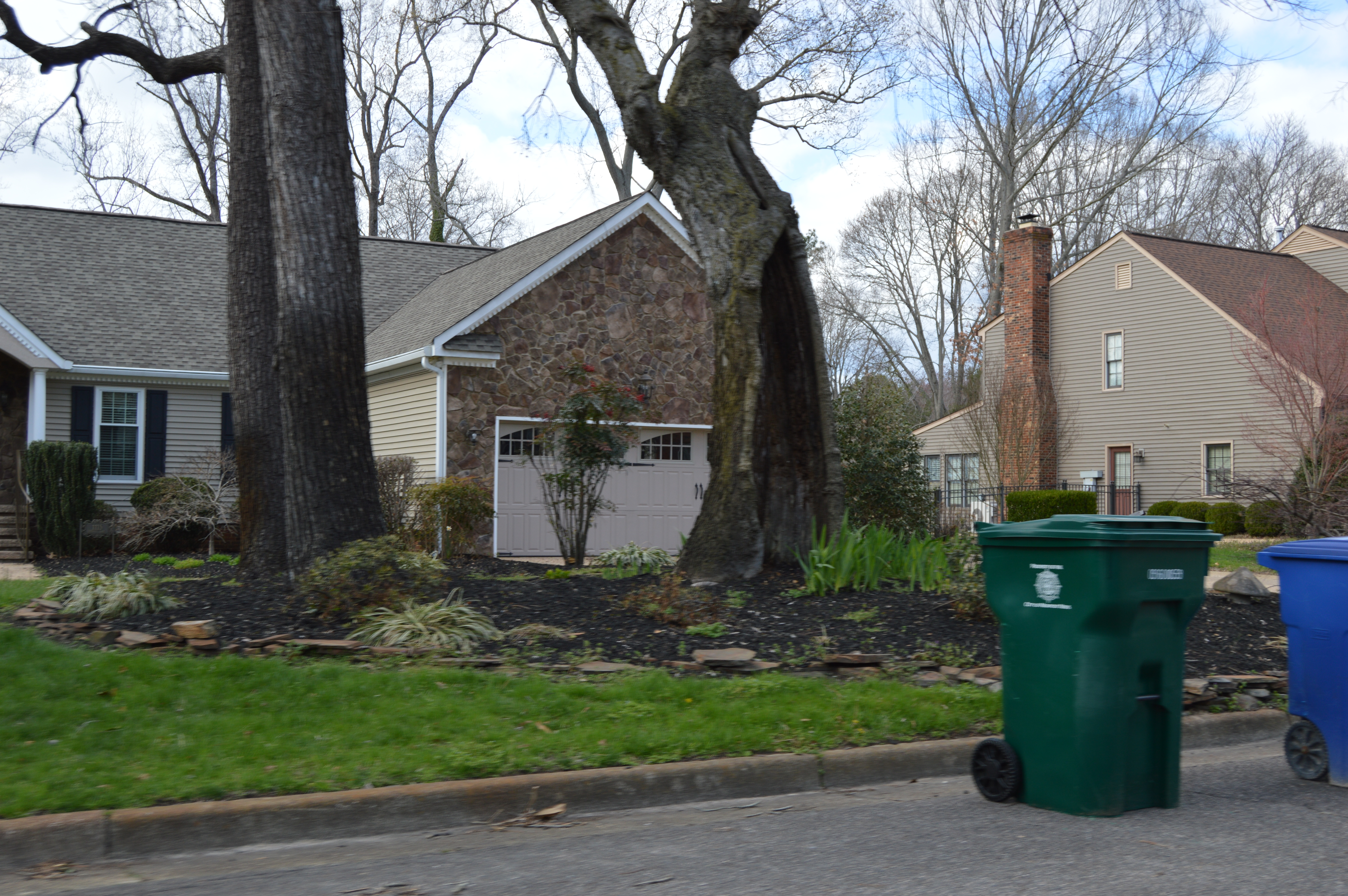
Site of the graves near the river

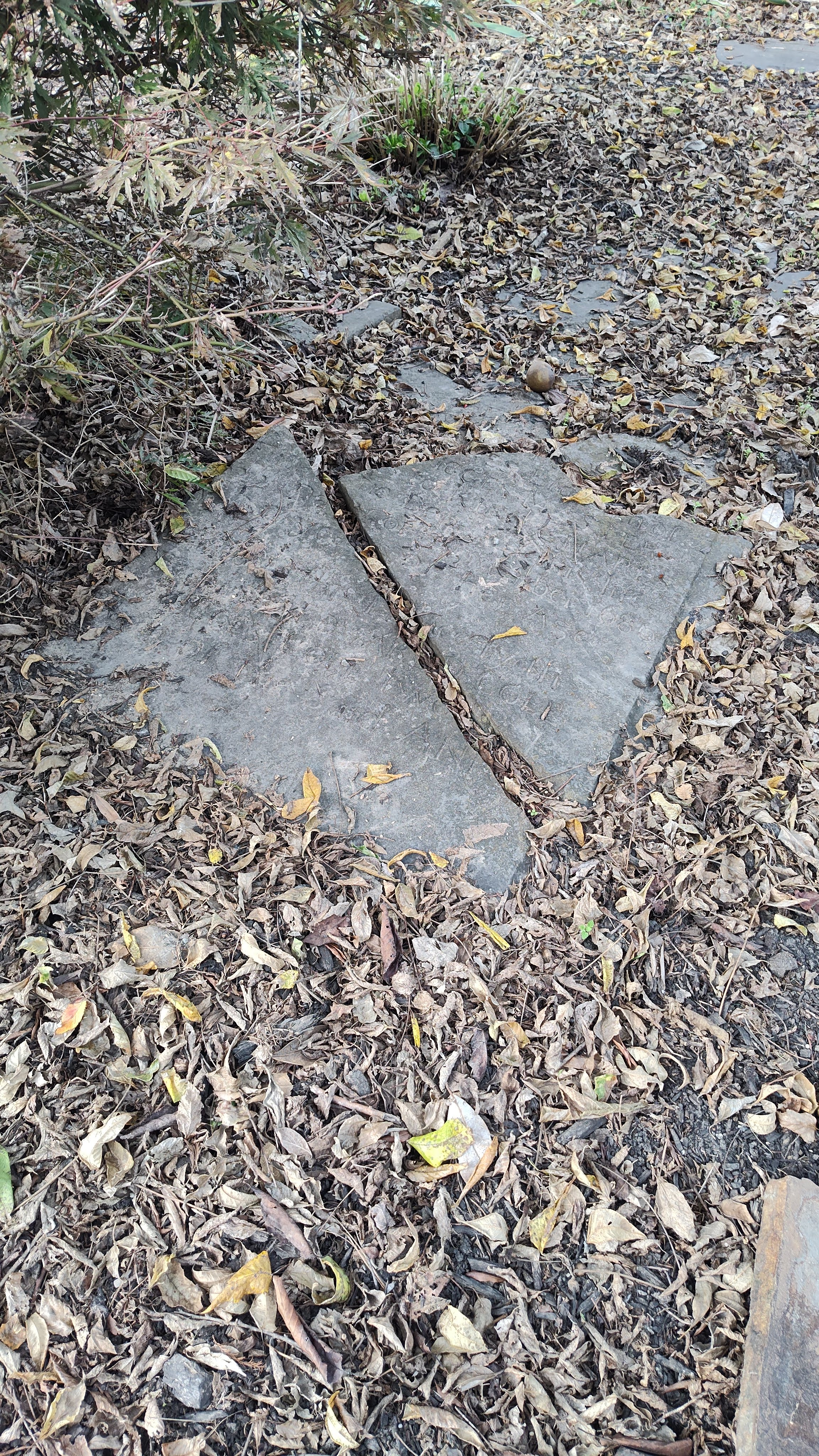
Grave maker 1 of 3.

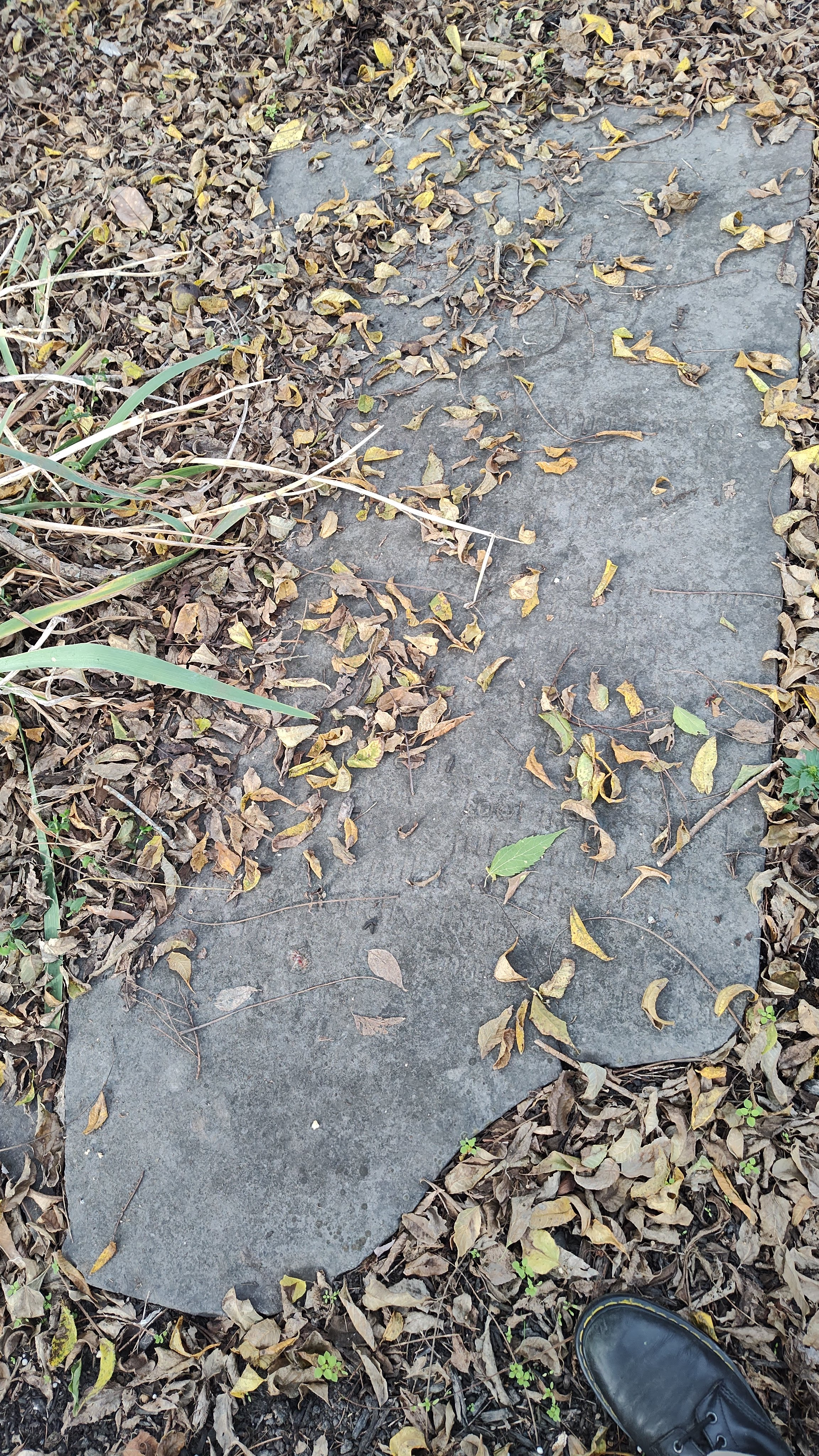
Grave maker 2 of 3.

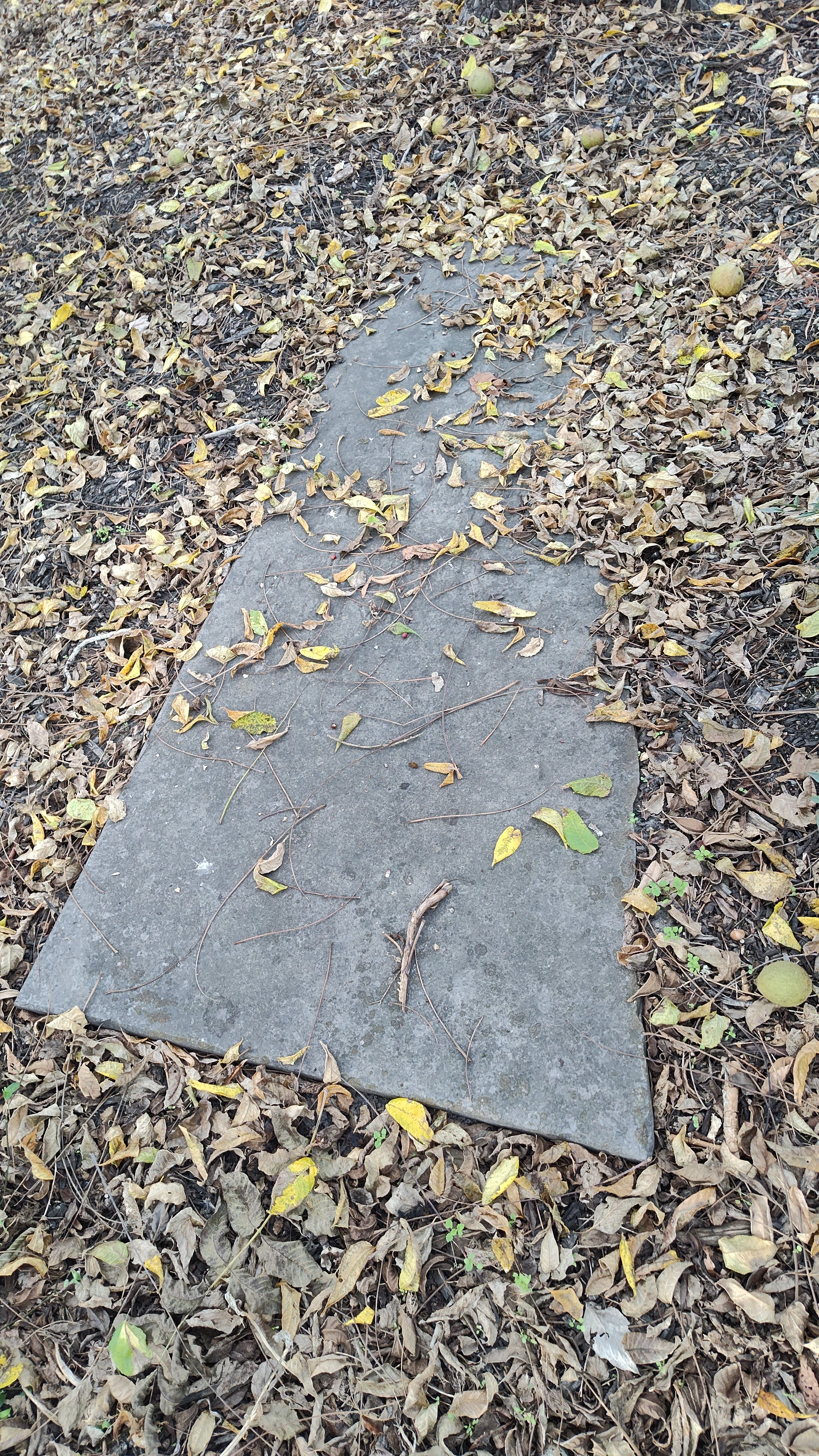
Grave maker 3 of 3.
