= Dudley Digges Jr. =

Virginia attorney, merchant, planter and politician (1694–1771)

Member of the House of Burgesses for Goochland County, Colony of Virginia
- In office 1730–1732 Serving with John Fleming
- Preceded by: position created
- Succeeded by: William Randolph

Personal details
- Born: 1694 E.D. plantation, York County, Virginia, Colony of Virginia
- Died: 1771 (aged 76–77) Colony of Virginia
- Spouse: Mary Hubard
- Children: Dudley Digges (1747-1768), Edward, Maria, Elizabeth, Susannah
- Parent(s): Dudley Digges, Susannah Cole
- Relatives: Cole Digges (burgess)(brother)
- Occupation: attorney, planter, politician

Dudley Digges (1694–1771) was a Virginia attorney, merchant, planter and politician who served in the House of Burgesses representing the newly created Goochland County (1730–1732). Possibly the least known of three related men of the same name who served in the Virginia legislature during the 18th century, this man was the son of Dudley Digges Sr. who served in both houses of the Virginia legislature and bought the family's historic E.D. plantation in York County from his cousin (and either he or descendants named it Bellfield or Bellefield). Genealogist John Frederick Dorman found that although this Dudley Digges was appointed a justice of the peace in Goochland County in 1735, three years later he bought 600 acres and moved back to James City County (which adjoins York County; the main street in Williamsburg still partly dividing the counties).

This Dudley Digges married Mary Hubard, and none of their children had children. However, their daughter Maria Digges became stewardess of the College of William and Mary in Williamsburg. Thus, he may be the Dudley Digges who died of small-pox in February 1768, as did a mulatto man who belonged to the college, weeks before Governor Francis Fauquier. However, Dorman believes this man's namesake son was the smallpox casualty, but does not give an alternate date of death for this man (the father), only notes that his other son, Edward Digges (d. 1815 or 1816) served as an infantry captain in the Revolutionary War before being committed to the Lunatic Hospital in Williamsburg, where he died. No record of his will or probate (which would indicate his date of death) exists, probably because James City County is one of the "burned counties", government records of which were sent to Richmond for safekeeping during the American Civil War, and destroyed in April 1865 when the departing Confederate army set fire to warehouses (which conflagration spread and destroyed most of the city).

Increasing confusion because of the same name and profession in the Tidewater area, possibly the most important of the three men of the same name was his lawyer nephew Dudley Digges (patriot), son of his Yorktown merchant brother Cole Digges (1691–1744), and who also represented York County (from 1752 until 1772) as well as witnessed wills and land deeds in the same Tidewater Virginia area and is associated with the Dudley Digges House (Yorktown).

== See also ==
- Williamsburg Bray School ( also known as Dudley Digges House (Williamsburg) )
