= Boldrup Plantation Archeological Site =

Archaeological site in Virginia, United States

- U.S. National Register of Historic Places
- Virginia Landmarks Register
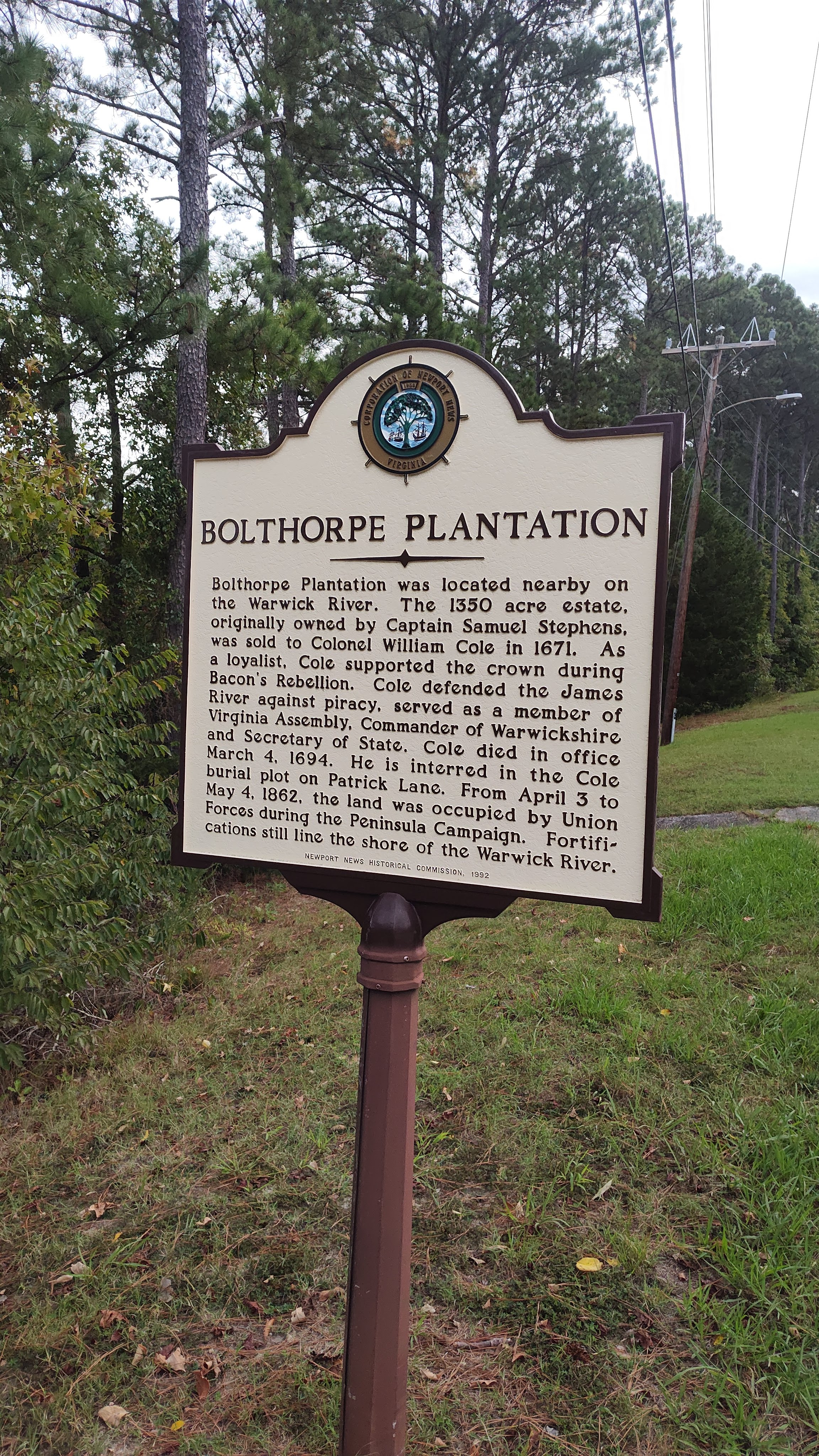
- Bolthorpe Plantation historical marker from city of Newport News
- Interactive map of Boldrup Plantation Archeological Site
- Nearest city: Newport News, Virginia
- Coordinates: 37°8′0.2222″N 76°34′32.0735″W
- Area: 42 acres (17 ha)
- NRHP reference No.: 82004573
- VLR No.: 121-0005

Significant dates
- Added to NRHP: September 16, 1982
- Designated VLR: September 15, 1981

Boldrup Plantation Archeological Site is a historic archaeological site located at Newport News, Virginia. A modern residential development has succeeded the 17th-century plantation. The area was originally patented by ancient planter William Claiborne in 1626. Three successive colonial governors lived at Boldrup (various spellings, including "Bolethorpe","Balthrope", and "Baldriff Neck"): John Harvey (d. 1646), Samuel Stephens (1629–1669) and William Berkeley (1605–1677). The last owned it through his wife (Gov. Stephens' widow), Frances Culpeper Berkeley, who with her new husband sold it to another member of the Virginia Governor's Council (and who would become the colony's secretary of state) William Cole (councillor) in 1671. Although it remained in the Cole family for at least another two generations (William Cole (burgess) also serving as a burgess), a 'William Cole' advertised it for sale in 1776 and again in 1782, by which time he was living at Buckland plantation in Charles City County, which he had also inherited. Soon thereafter, Boldrup was owned by Judge Richard Cary, who was married to Mary Cole, daughter of William Cole Jr. and lived at Peartree Hall nearby, and at his death bequeathed it to his son Miles Cary. The Cary family owned several nearby plantations in Warwick and adjoining counties, including Richneck, Marshfield (on Mulberry Island) and Windmill Point, but never resided at Boldrup.

By 1896, little remained of the once-extensive plantation, which archeologists explored in the 1980s before the current residential development. William Cole's grave slab remains in a residential front yard; the graves of his second and third wives, and a pit house, were also unearthed and explored during those excavations.

It was listed on the National Register of Historic Places in 1982.

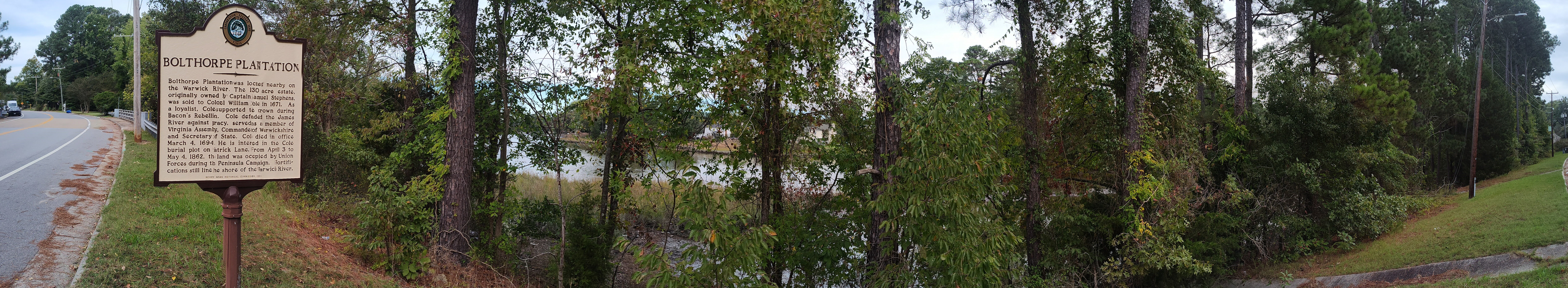
Historical Marker placed by city of Newport News. Visible from Beechmont Drive.

Boldrup Plantation burial site
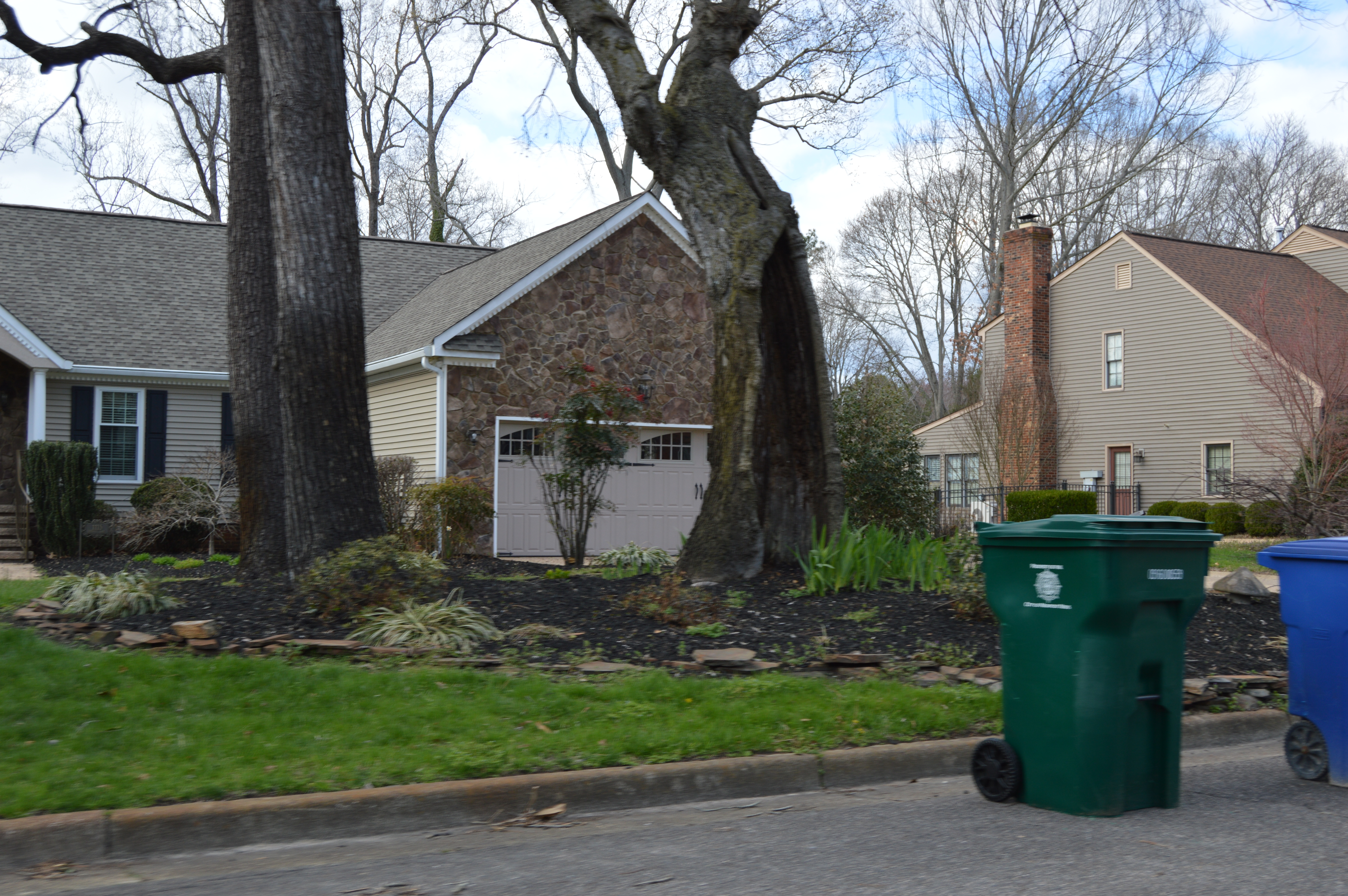
Site of the graves near the river

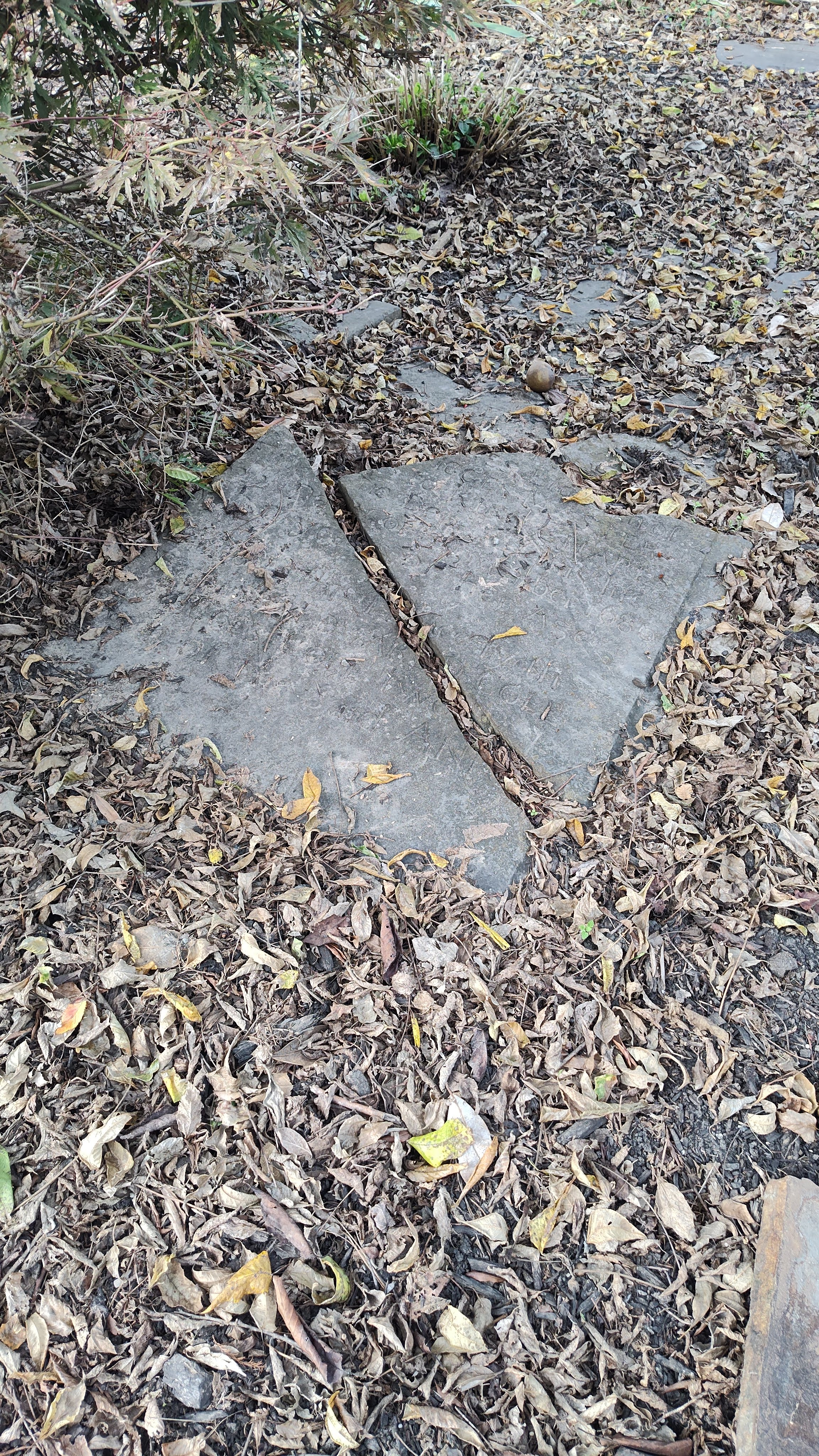
Grave maker 1 of 3.

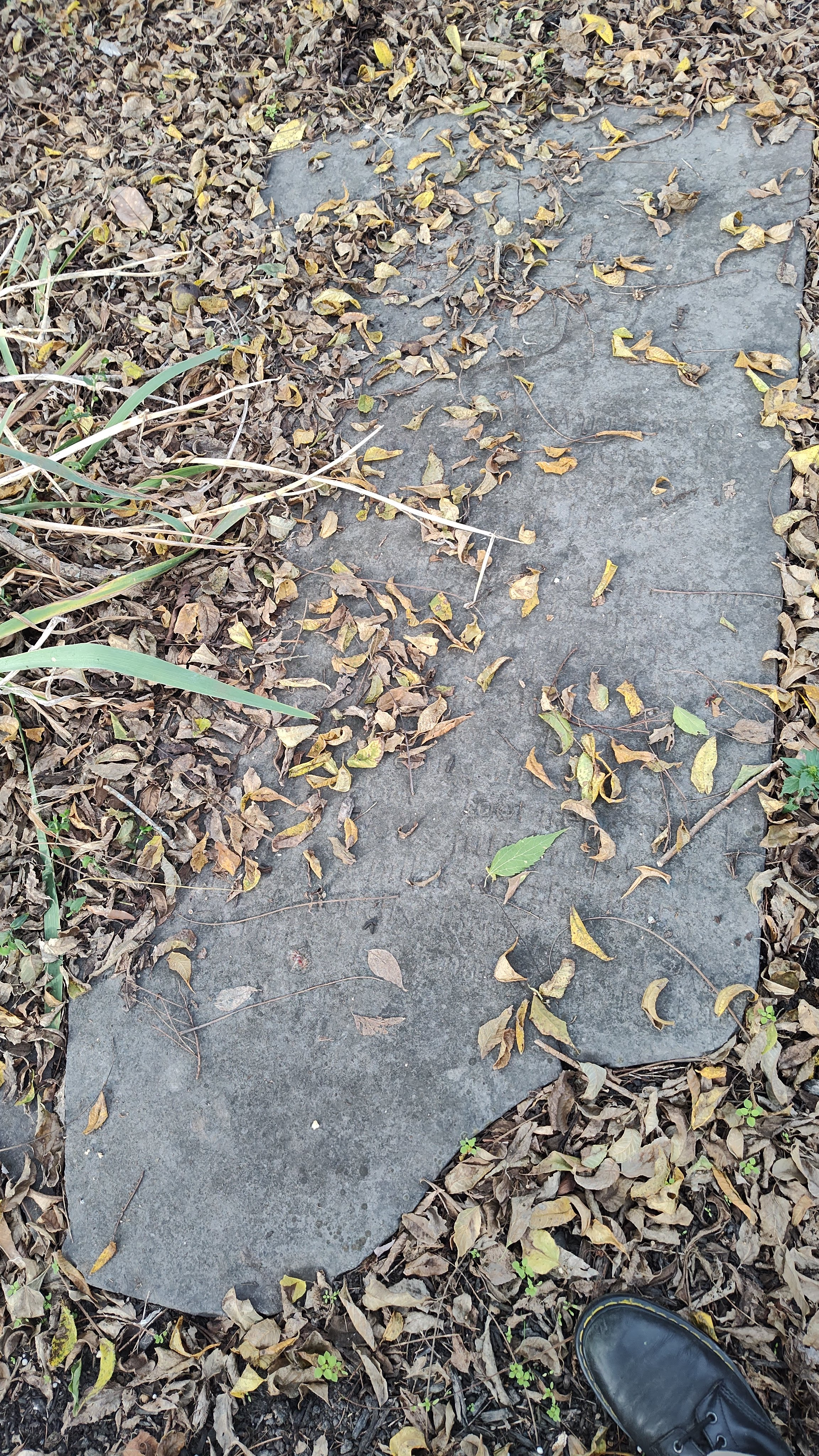
Grave maker 2 of 3.

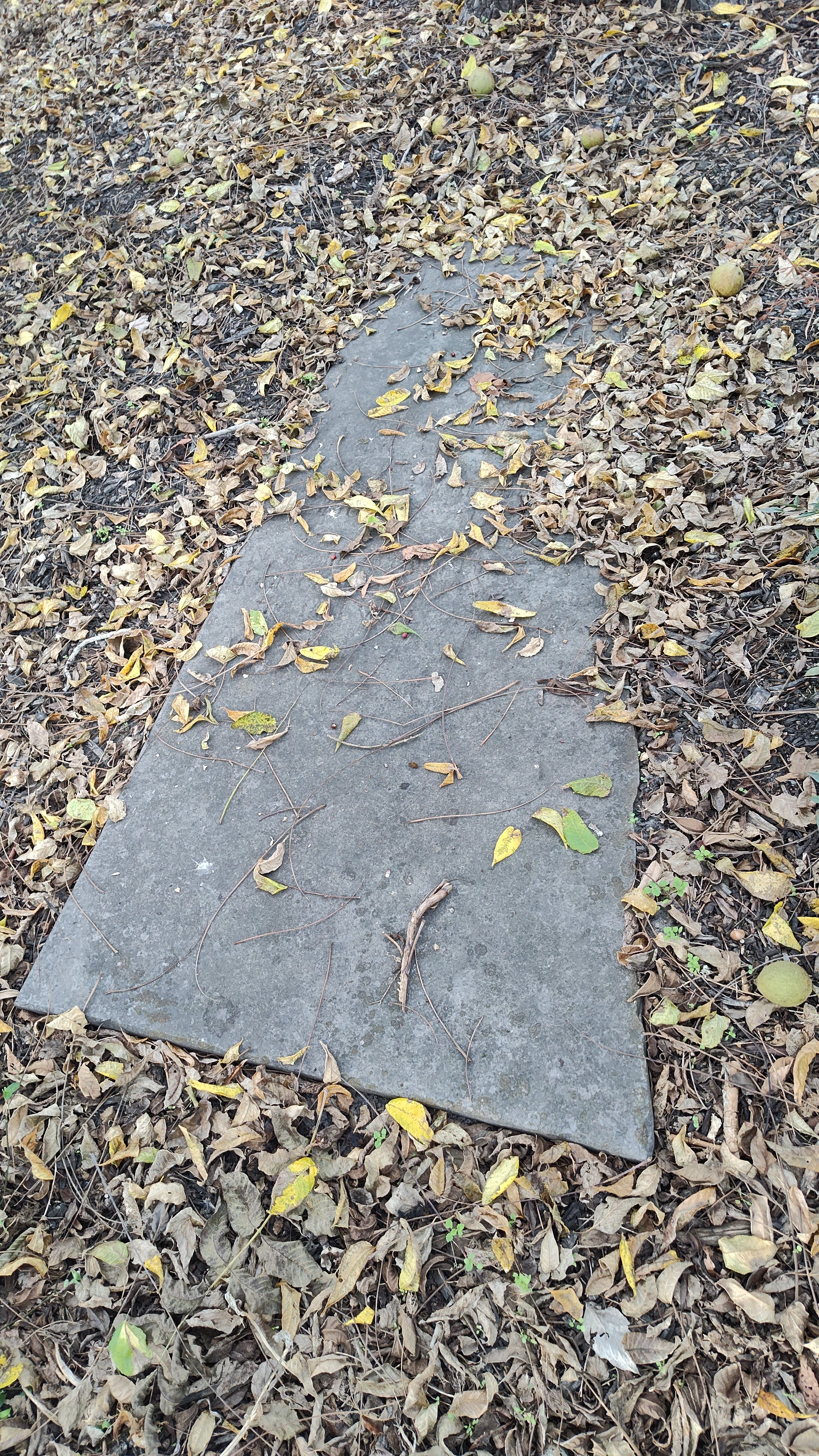
Grave maker 3 of 3.
