= Dudley Digges House (Yorktown, Virginia) =

Historical building in Yorktown, Virginia, United States

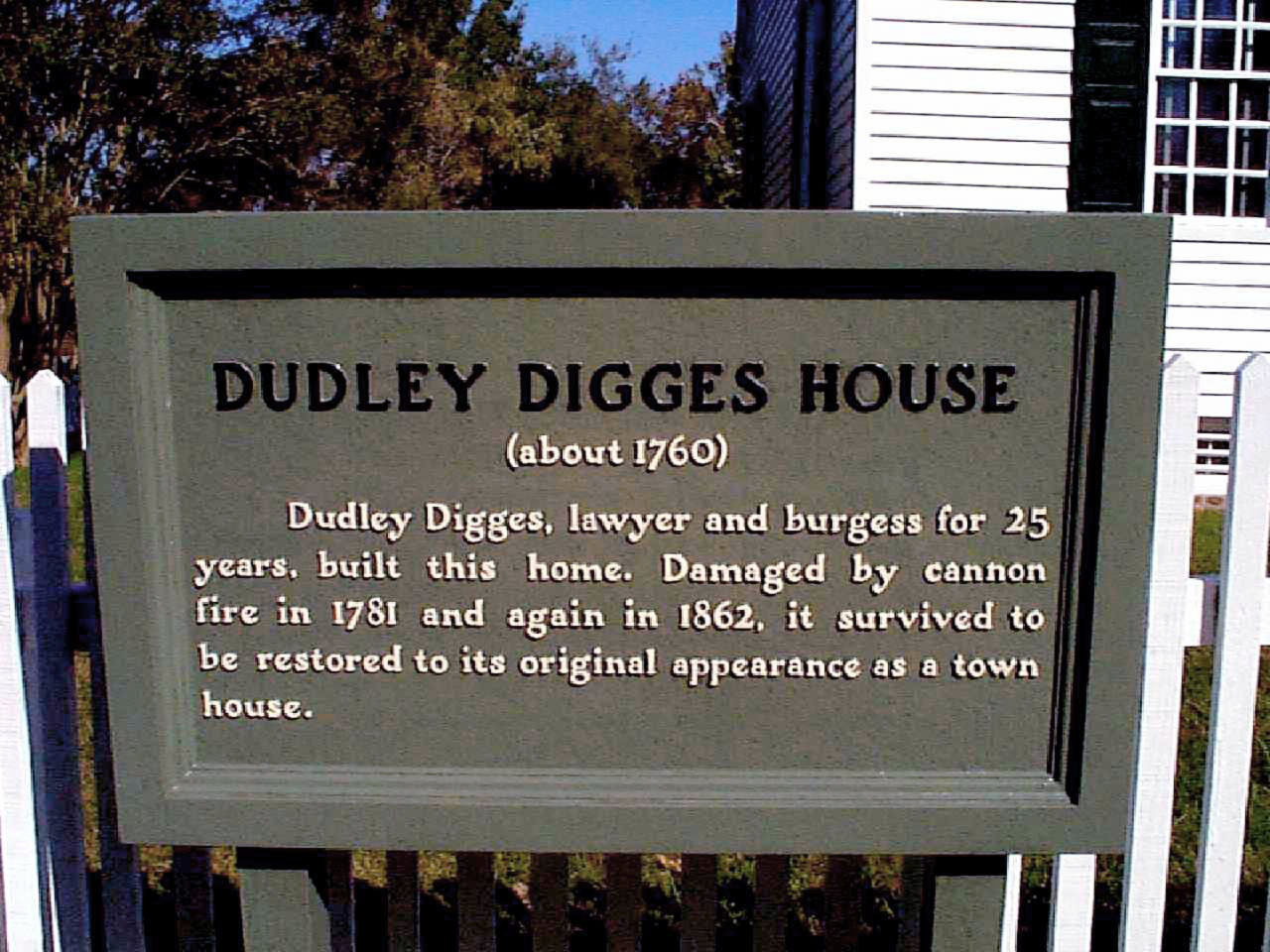
- Historical marker
- Type: Architecture
- Location: 605 Main St, York County, Virginia
- Coordinates: 37°14.037′N 76°30.388′W
- Built: a. 1760
- Governing body: National Park Service

Virginia Landmarks Register
- Official name: Dudley Digges House
- Reference no.: Candidate Site 099-0022

The Dudley Digges House is a historical building in Yorktown, Virginia built around 1760. It is named for the owner, Dudley Digges, who was elected lieutenant governor of the Commonwealth of Virginia during the American Revolution but captured by the British before he could take office. The home was severely damaged during the 1781 Siege of Yorktown.
