= Dudley Digges (burgess) =

Virginia merchant, planter and politician (1665–1711)

Member of the Virginia Governor's Council
- In office 1698–1711

Member of the House of Burgesses for Warwick County, Colony of Virginia
- In office 1695-1697 Serving with William Roscow, Richard Whitaker, Robert Huibberd
- Preceded by: ____ Cary
- Succeeded by: Miles Cary

Personal details
- Born: 1665 E.D. plantation, York County, Virginia, Colony of Virginia
- Died: January 18, 1711 (aged 45–46) E.D. plantation, York County, Virginia, Colony of Virginia
- Spouse: Susannah Cole
- Children: Cole, Edward, Dudley Jr. and Elizabeth
- Parent(s): Edward Digges, Elizabeth Page
- Relatives: William Digges(brother)
- Occupation: planter, official, slave trader, politician

Dudley Digges (1665–1711) was a Virginia merchant, planter and politician who served in both houses of the Virginia General Assembly, as well as agent of the Royal African Company and factor for British merchants John Jeffreys and Micajah Perry Sr. After his marriage, Digges twice represented Warwick County in the House of Burgesses before being appointed to the Virginia Governor's Council in 1698 (with a slight gap between his appointment by Governor Andros after he was replaced by Gov. Nicholson and the Lords of Trade and Plantations approved his appointment). Digges also served as auditor and surveyor-general of Virginia from 1705 until his death, and purchased the E.D. Plantation where he had been born from his nephew Edward upon the death of his brother William in Maryland. That property, renamed Bellfield plantation, is now part of Naval Weapons Station Yorktown. His sons Cole and Dudley Digges Jr. would also continue the family's planter and political traditions.

== Personal life ==
Coat of Arms of Dudley Digges

He married Susanna Cole (1674-1708), daughter of Col. William Cole of Bolthorpe in Warwick county, member of the Virginia Governor's Council and Secretary of the colony, and his first wife (whose name is now unknown). Before her death, Susanna bore sons Cole Digges, Edward Digges (who died in Woodford, England in 1711) and Dudley Digges, as well as a daughter Elizabeth. After Susannah's death, Col. Cole married Anne Digges, this man's sister, and after her death married Martha Lear.
