= Alfred M. Monfalcone =

American politician

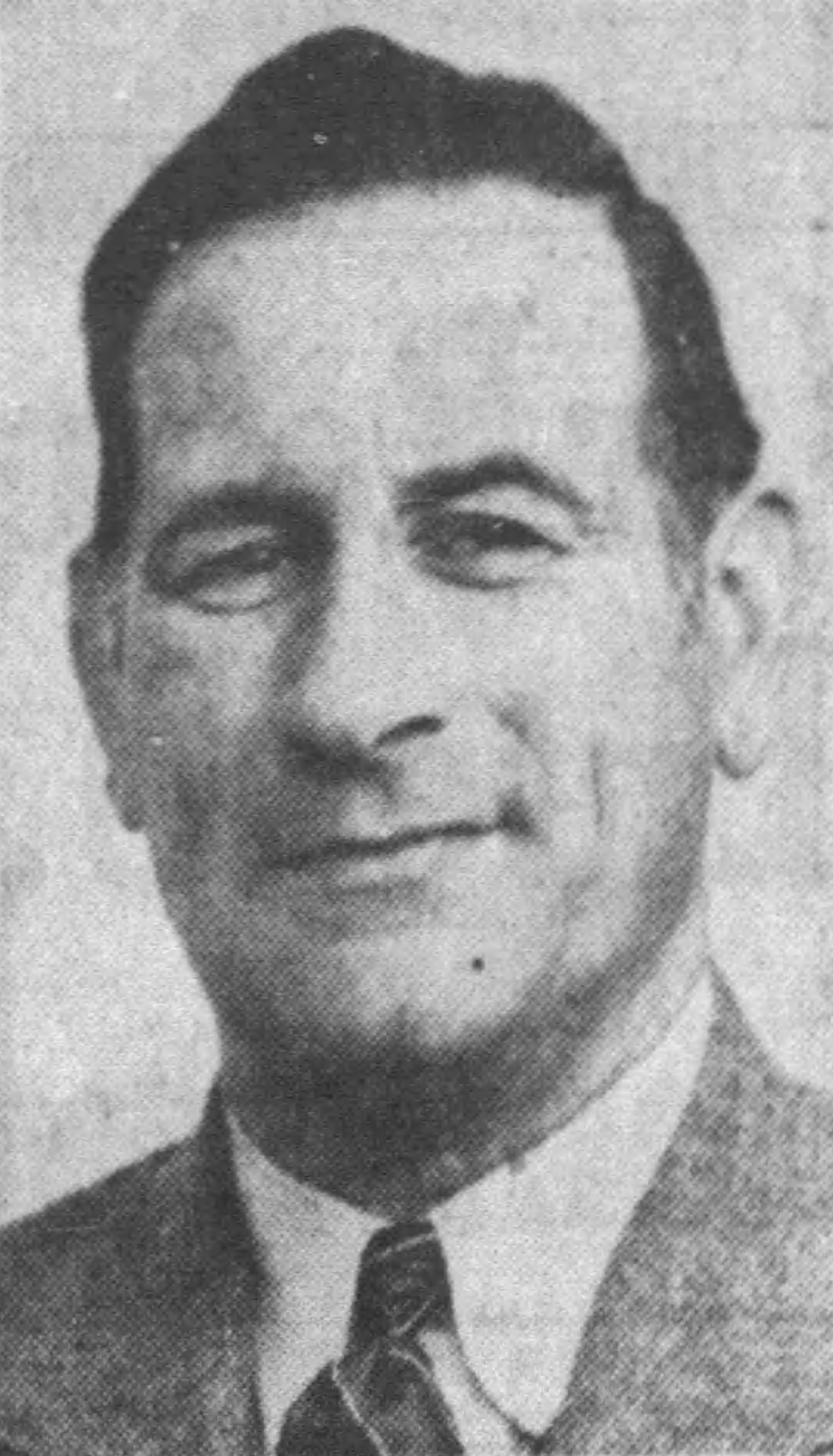

Mayor of Newport News, Virginia
- In office January 16, 1956 – September 1, 1956
- Preceded by: R. Cowles Taylor
- Succeeded by: Robert B. Smith

Vice Mayor of Newport News, Virginia
- In office July 1, 1958 – July 1, 1966
- Succeeded by: B. M. Millner
- In office September 1954 – January 16, 1956
- Preceded by: Isaac Leake Wornom
- In office September 1950 – September 1952
- Preceded by: Harry Reyner
- Succeeded by: Isaac Leake Wornom

Member of Newport News City Council
- In office September 1, 1942 – June 18, 1970
- Preceded by: Nathaniel Jarrett Webb

Personal details
- Born: May 11, 1890; Norfolk, Virginia, U.S.
- Died: June 18, 1970 (aged 80); Newport News, Virginia, U.S.
- Political party: Democratic Party

Alfred M. Monfalcone (May 11, 1890 – June 18, 1970) was the mayor of Newport News, Virginia, from January 1956 until September 1956. He served as a member of the city's council from 1942 until his death.

== Early life ==
Alfred M. Monfalcone was born in Norfolk, Virginia, but moved to Newport News as a child. His father worked at the Newport News Shipbuilding Company during the 1890s. He had eight brothers, including Emmanuel and Edward.

== Business career ==
In 1907, Alfred and Edward Monfalcone opened a business selling newspapers and magazines in Newport News. The business later moved premises to Washington Avenue, where it remained for over thirty years and became a popular meeting place for local groups. In 1946, it was sold to William Lilly and R. L. Agey and was operated under the name Agey, Inc. In 1950, he was the owner of a gas station on West Avenue in Newport News.

From 1924 until 1930, he served as president of Newport News's Sunday School baseball league. In 1934, he helped found a baseball team in Newport News and served as its president for four years. He served as president of the city's Community Athletic Association during the 1930s and later again in the 1940s.

== Political career ==
=== First city council term ===
In January 1942, Monfalcone announced his candidacy for the Democratic Party nomination for Newport News City Council. The terms of councilmen Harry Reyner and Nathaniel Jarrett Webb were due to expire that August. Following the April primary elections, Monfalcone and Reyner were announced as the Democratic candidates to fill the two empty positions. The Virginian-Pilot said that the party's nomination guaranteed their election, and the Republican Party had announced that it would not be fielding any candidates for the seats.

In June 1942, Monfalcone was elected unopposed to the Newport News City Council. The election saw an extremely low turnout, with only 588 votes cast from a population of around 52,000 people; Monfalcone received 556 votes compared to Reyner's 524 votes. He took his seat in September that year.

In 1943, he was a member of the city's defense council, overseeing the protection of civilians during the Second World War in the event of an attack. The following year, he proposed a successful motion which allowed soldiers and sailors to use a Virginia National Guard armory in Newport News as sleeping quarters.

=== Second city council term ===
In April 1946, Monfalcone and Harry Reyner were announced as the Democratic candidates for election to the city council; both were seeking reelection to their incumbent seats, with terms ending on August 31. Monfalcone received more votes than any other candidate in the primary election. Both men were later reelected unopposed, with Monfalcone again receiving the highest number of votes.

=== Third and fourth city council terms ===
Monfalcone once again announced his intention to stand for reelection in January 1950. Both he and Reyner ran in the Democratic primary that April, but the latter was defeated by Thomas J. Crandol for the candidacy. They were elected unopposed, but a write-in campaign for Reyner reduced Monfalcone's lead by over 500 votes. In September, the start of Monfalcone's third term as a councilman, he was elected vice president (ex officio vice mayor) of the city under R. Cowles Taylor's mayoralty. The post was left absent following the defeat of Harry Reyner earlier that year. He held the position for two years and was succeeded in September 1952 by Isaac Leake Wornom.

In January 1954, he announced his campaign for a fourth city council term, and once again won the highest number of votes at the primary. The uncontested June election saw a record low turnout, with Crandol and Monfalcone receiving 441 and 439 votes respectively and securing reelection. Monfalcone was elected Vice Mayor of Newport News for a second time in September 1954, with R. Cowles Taylor serving again as mayor. In December 1955, he died while in office, and Monfalcone succeeded him as mayor the following month. Monfalcone was succeeded in the position by Robert B. Smith in September 1956.

=== Consolidated city council with Warwick ===
In August 1957, Monfalcone announced his candidacy for the new seven-seat municipal council formed by the upcoming consolidation of Newport News and Warwick. He was one of 28 candidates in the November election, and was elected to the new consolidated council. He was elected vice mayor of the new council upon its official creation on July 1 the following year, with Oscar J. Brittingham Jr. serving as mayor.

Monfalcone was a candidate again for city council in 1962, winning the Democratic primary election. He was reelected to the council for his sixth term after receiving the sixth highest number of votes. He was subsequently reelected as vice mayor, with Donald M. Hyatt taking over as mayor.

Monfalcone announced his candidacy for a seventh term in 1966, being described by the Daily Press as a "durable municipal legislator" and "a champion of the working man". He once again received the Democratic nomination, but had the lowest number of votes for a successful candidate. He was elected to the council again, and succeeded as vice mayor by B. M. Millner.

In 1969, he announced that he would not be seeking reelection for city council.

=== Other work ===
In 1964, Monfalcone was appointed co-chair of the Italian Nationalities unit for Virginia, helping to promote Democratic candidates to Italian voters in the state.

== Personal life ==
Monfalcone and his wife Ruth had two daughters (Jane and Florence) and two sons (Alfred and Edward). He was a member and trustee of Newport News Lodge No. 315 of the Benevolent and Protective Order of Elks, taking an active part in their amateur theatre shows through the annual Elks Charity Minstrel Show. He was also a member of the Independent Order of Odd Fellows, the Junior Order of United American Mechanics and Kiwanis.

Monfalcone died in a Newport News hospital on June 18, 1970.

| Preceded by R. Cowles Taylor | Mayor of Newport News; 1956 | Succeeded by Robert B. Smith |
