= Warwick County, Virginia =

Former place

Coordinates: 37°7′46.7″N 76°32′31.8″W

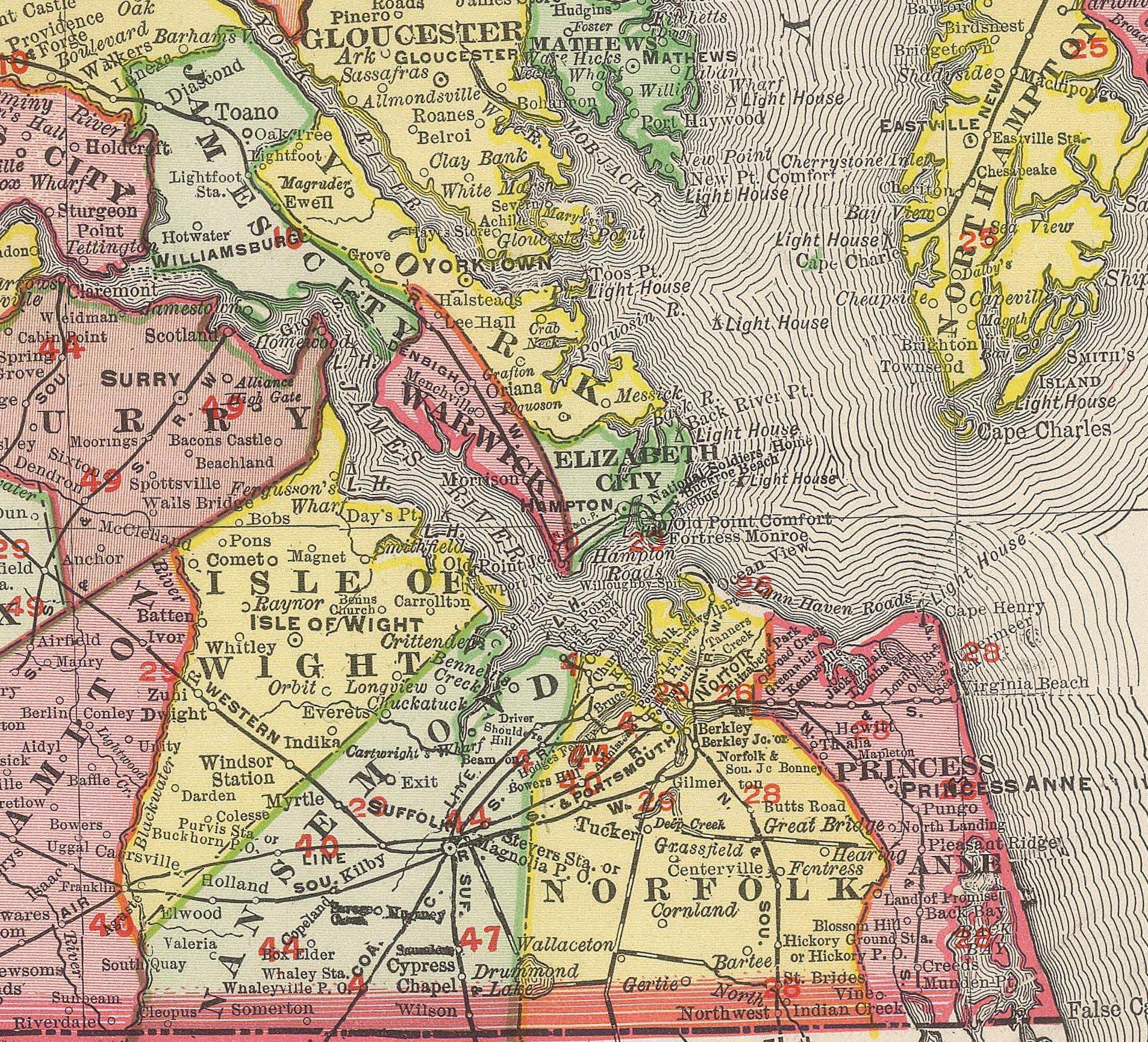
1903 map depicting Warwick County and other "lost counties" of Virginia. Warwick was originally one of the eight shires created in colonial Virginia in 1634. It was consolidated with the independent city of Newport News in 1958.

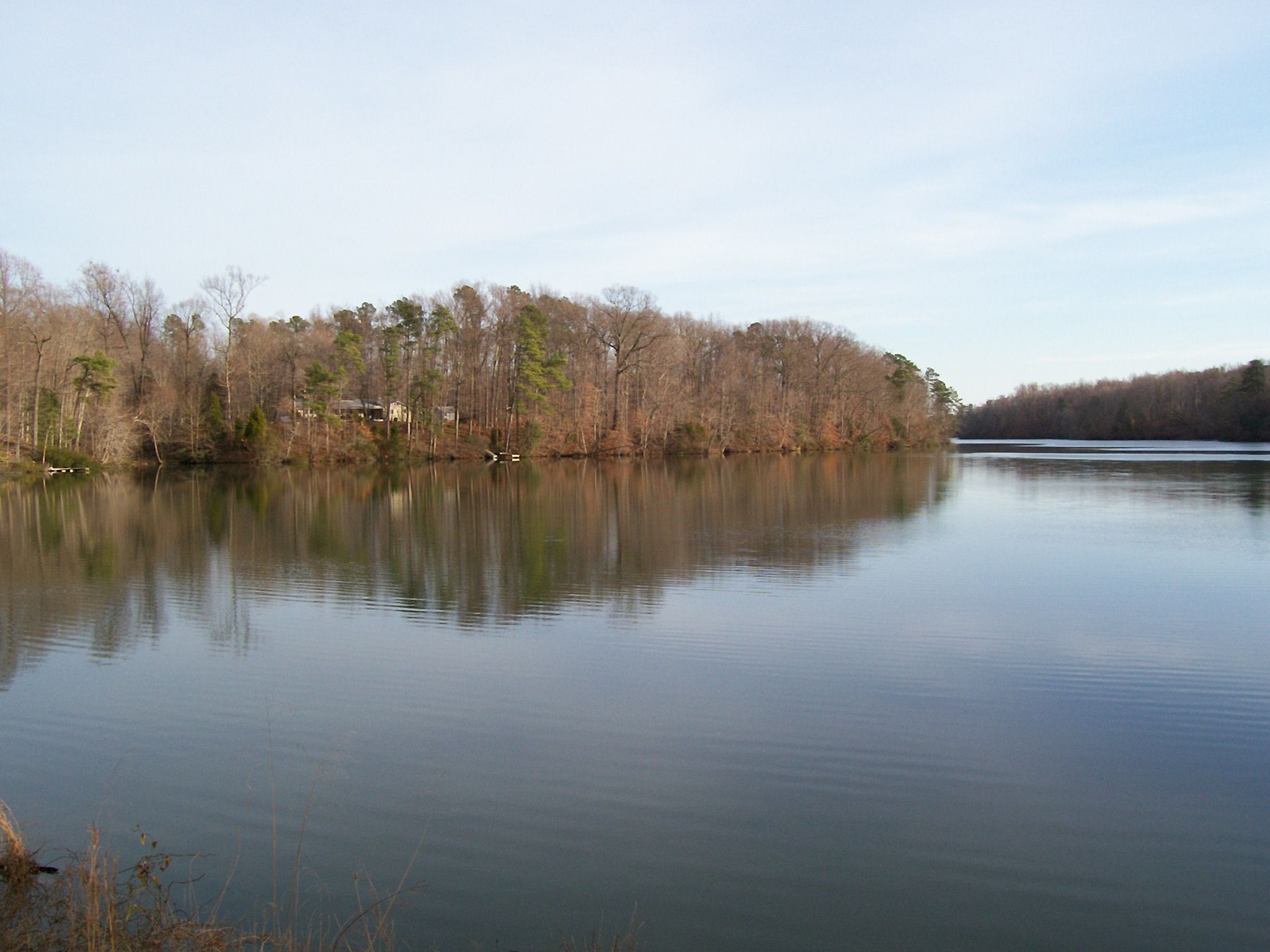
Skiffe's Creek formed the border of Warwick County and James City County beginning in 1634. It is a tributary of the James River

Warwick County was a county in Southeast Virginia that was created from Warwick River Shire, one of eight created in the Virginia Colony in 1634. Located on the Virginia Peninsula on the northern bank of the James River between Hampton Roads and Jamestown, the area consisted primarily of farms and small unincorporated villages until the arrival of the Peninsula Extension of the Chesapeake and Ohio Railway in 1881 and development led by industrialist Collis P. Huntington.

With the railroad came the coal piers, several local stations in Warwick County for passenger service and shipping produce and seafood to markets, and a branch link to the resorts and military facilities in neighboring Elizabeth City County at Old Point Comfort. The community at the southeastern edge on the harbor of Hampton Roads became Newport News in 1896, hosting the world's largest shipyard.

At the outset of World War I, the U.S. Army facility which became Fort Eustis was established in the county. After the war, Camp Patrick Henry, a former military facility, became the site of Newport News/Williamsburg International Airport. In 1952, the county incorporated as the city of Warwick, Virginia. After sparring over annexations and exploring various plans to refine and/or combine local governments, by mutual agreement, after existing for over 325 years, the City of Warwick was politically consolidated with the younger city of Newport News on July 1, 1958. The better known name of "Newport News" was assumed for the combined entity, forming one of the contemporary cities of Hampton Roads.

== Colonial period ==
During the 17th century, shortly after establishment of the settlement at Jamestown in 1607, English settlers explored and began settling the areas adjacent to Hampton Roads. By 1634, the English colony of Virginia consisted of eight shires or counties with a total population of approximately 5,000 inhabitants.

Warwick River Shire took its name from Robert Rich, second Earl of Warwick and a prominent member of the Virginia Company who was proprietor of Richneck Plantation. Warwick River Shire became Warwick County in 1643.

The first courthouse and jail were located at Warwick Towne, established in 1680. The colonial port was located at Deep Creek and the Warwick River on 50 acres (200,000 m^{2}) of Samuel Mathews' land.

From as early as 1635, Warwick River County included the Anglican Parishes of Blunt Poynt (Blount Point), Denbigh, Mulberry Island, Nutmeg Quarter, Stanley Hundred, Warwick, and Waters Creek. The parishes served as smaller local units of government and religious and community organizations.

== American Revolutionary War ==
Warwick County became an important site for shipbuilding during the American Revolutionary War. During the inaugural session of the Virginia General Assembly, the senate began acquiring lands for naval manufacturing. Charles O. Paullin states that "no other state owned as much land, properties, and manufactories devoted to naval purposes as Virginia. Sampson Mathews from nearby Augusta County oversaw the operation stationed at Warwick, the most important of Virginia's ship works.

Following the war, the General Assembly passed the Virginia Statute for Religious Freedom in 1786, disestablishing the Church of England in Virginia and effectively dissolving the original colonial parishes within the county.

== Statehood, 19th century ==
Warwick County recorded 1,690 persons in the federal census of 1790, making it the third smallest county population-wise in Virginia. In 1809, Warwick Towne was abandoned, and the county seat was moved to the area of Denbigh, near Stoney Run.

The new county seat was at Denbigh, where in 1810 Warwick's first brick courthouse was built. It also served as clerk's office and jail. On the afternoon of April 5, 1862 as part of the Peninsula Campaign 1862, IV Corps under BG Erasmus D. Keyes reached and looted the Warwick County Courthouse, later using it as a divisional headquarters and balloon reconnaissance post. The clerk’s office was burned on December 15, 1864, and the court minute books and loose records from 1787 to 1819 were destroyed. Other records sent to Richmond, Virginia for safekeeping during the civil war were lost in the fire there on April 3, 1865.

In 1884, a large courthouse was erected on the same tract, the clerk retaining the old building. Both served until the merger with the city of Newport News in 1958.

== C&O brings railroad transportation, development of a new city ==
Immediately after the end of the American Civil War in 1865, land agents began acquiring land in Warwick County for Collis P. Huntington, the railroad magnate, for "future enterprise". On the basis of these land purchases, the original city of Newport News was to be built at the southern end of the county. In 1880, Huntington formed the Old Dominion Land Company, to which he turned over his holdings. The following year, in 1881, it was announced that Newport News had been chosen as the Atlantic deep water terminus of the Chesapeake and Ohio Railway (C&O). Construction work on the C&O's Peninsula Extension began at Newport News Point in December 1880. A second crew began building east from Richmond in February 1881. They met 1.25 miles (2.01 km) west of Williamsburg on October 16, 1881.

The C&O provided the promised transportation by rail to the Yorktown Centennial on October 19. During the next few years, Huntington developed the southeastern area of the county extensively, notably building the new Hotel Warwick. In 1886, Huntington established Newport News Shipbuilding and Drydock Company.

The boom community of Newport News became an independent city in 1896 by an act of the Virginia General Assembly, one of the few cities in Virginia to have never been incorporated as a town and it became Virginia's third largest city in population at one time.

== 20th-century military facilities ==
In 1918, Warwick County became the site of the military installation, Camp Abraham Eustis, later renamed Fort Eustis. The U.S. Army base, hastily constructed during World War I near the mouth of the Warwick River, included Mulberry Island. Lee Hall, Virginia was the closest railroad station and handled a large volume of troop traffic, especially during World War II when Camp Patrick Henry was established nearby. Camp Patrick Henry served primarily as a troop staging ground during World War II under the control of the Hampton Roads Port of Embarkation. The camp, founded in late 1942, was an approximately 1,700-acre (6.9 km^{2}) complex, built in largely virgin forest. At its peak, Camp Patrick Henry had a capacity of approximately 35,000. After World War II, it closed and the land was redeveloped as a commercial airport, now known as Newport News/Williamsburg International Airport.

== Historical Population ==
Historical population
Census	Pop.	Note	%±
1790	1,690		—
1800	1,659		−1.8%
1810	1,835		10.6%
1820	1,508		−17.8%
1830	1,570		4.1%
1840	1,456		−7.3%
1850	1,516		4.1%
1860	1,740		14.8%
1870	1,672		−3.9%
1880	2,258		35.0%
1890	6,650		194.5%
1900	4,888		−26.5%
1910	6,041		23.6%
1920	11,417		89.0%
1930	8,829		−22.7%
1940	9,248		4.7%
1950	39,875		331.2%
1790-1950 Population as Warwick County

== Politics ==
Notable Politicians of Warwick County
Name	Offices
Samuel Matthews (captain)	Virginia Governor's Council 1623-1637, 1639-1644
John Harvey (Virginia governor)	Colonial Governor of Virginia 1628-1635
William Cole (immigrant)	House of Burgesses 1629
William Tucker (Jamestown immigrant)	House of Burgesses 1634
Thomas Harwood	House of Burgesses 1640-1642, 1645; 5th Speaker of the Virginia House of Burgesses 1647–1649; Virginia Governor's Council 1652
William Berkeley (governor)	Colonial Governor of Virginia 1642–1652, 1660–1677
William Whitby	House of Burgesses 1642, 1644, 1652-1655; 9th Speaker of the Virginia House of Burgesses 1653
Francis Dade (politician) aka 'John Smith'	11th Speaker of the Virginia House of Burgesses 1658
Samuel Mathews (colonial Virginia governor)	House of Burgesses 1652-1654; Virginia Governor's Council 1656; Commonwealth Governor of Virginia 1656-1660
Miles Cary	House of Burgesses 1660–1662; Virginia Governor's Council 1663–1667
Samuel Stephens (North Carolina governor)	Colonial governor of North Carolina 1667–1669
William Cole (councillor)	Virginia Governor's Council 1675-1692
Dudley Digges (burgess)	House of Burgesses 1691-1692, 1695-1697; Virginia Governor's Council 1698–1711
William Harwood (burgess)	House of Burgesses 1710–1714, 1728–1734
William Cole (burgess)	House of Burgesses 1715-1728; Sheriff and coroner of Warwick County.
Cole Digges (burgess)	House of Burgesses 1715-1720; Virginia Governor's Council 1720-1744
William Digges (burgess)	House of Burgesses 1752–1771
Richard Cary	Fifth Virginia Convention 1776; Virginia Ratifying Convention 1788
William Harwood, Jr.	Fifth Virginia Convention 1776, Delegate 1st Virginia General Assembly 1776
David Jameson (governor)	Senator 1st Virginia General Assembly 1776
Cole Digges (patriot)	Virginia House of Delegates 1777 - 1783; Virginia Ratifying Convention 1788
Edward Harwood (Virginia politician)	Virginia House of Delegates 1777 – April 20, 1780, May 7, 1781 – May 4, 1783
Wilson Miles Cary	Virginia House of Delegates 1783–1786
James A. Fields	Virginia House of Delegates 1889 – 1891
J. Clyde Morris	1st and only city manager of Warwick, Virginia 1952-1958

Presidential Elections Results
Year	Republican	Democratic	Third Parties
1956	56.4% 4,872	39.4% 3,406	4.2% 362
1952	54.0% 3,307	45.8% 2,806	0.2% 11
1948	32.0% 1,014	57.6% 1,822	10.4% 329
1944	30.3% 807	69.5% 1,849	0.2% 5
1940	22.2% 305	77.6% 1,065	0.2% 3
1936	18.6% 200	80.9% 870	0.5% 5
1932	26.9% 242	71.7% 645	1.4% 13
1928	60.9% 465	39.1% 298	
1924	18.0% 58	76.8% 248	5.3% 17
1920	40.8% 109	56.9% 152	2.3% 6
1916	35.3% 53	64.7% 97	
1912	9.9% 17	71.5% 123	18.6% 32

== See also ==
- Warwick, Virginia
- Newport News, Virginia
- Warwick County Courthouses
- List of former United States counties
- Former counties, cities, and towns of Virginia
- Category:People from Warwick County, Virginia
