= Donald Hyatt =

Donald Hyatt may refer to:

- Donald M. Hyatt, mayor of Newport News, Virginia
- Donald Hyatt, character in Alice Doesn't Live Here Anymore and Alice (TV series)
