= Warwick River (Virginia) =

River in Newport News, Virginia, United States

Coordinates: 37°6′22.3″N 76°33′40″W

The Warwick River is a 14.4-mile-long (23.2 km) tidal estuary which empties into the James River a few miles from Hampton Roads at the southern end of the Chesapeake Bay in southeast Virginia in the United States. Originating in York County near the northern side a few miles west of Yorktown, it flows south across the Virginia Peninsula and is almost entirely located in the independent city of Newport News.

The Warwick River took its name from Robert Rich, second Earl of Warwick and a prominent member of the Virginia Company of London who was proprietor of Richneck Plantation in Warwick River Shire, one of the eight original shires of Virginia created in 1634. The shire became Warwick County in 1643, and became part of the independent city of Newport News in 1958 through a municipal consolidation.

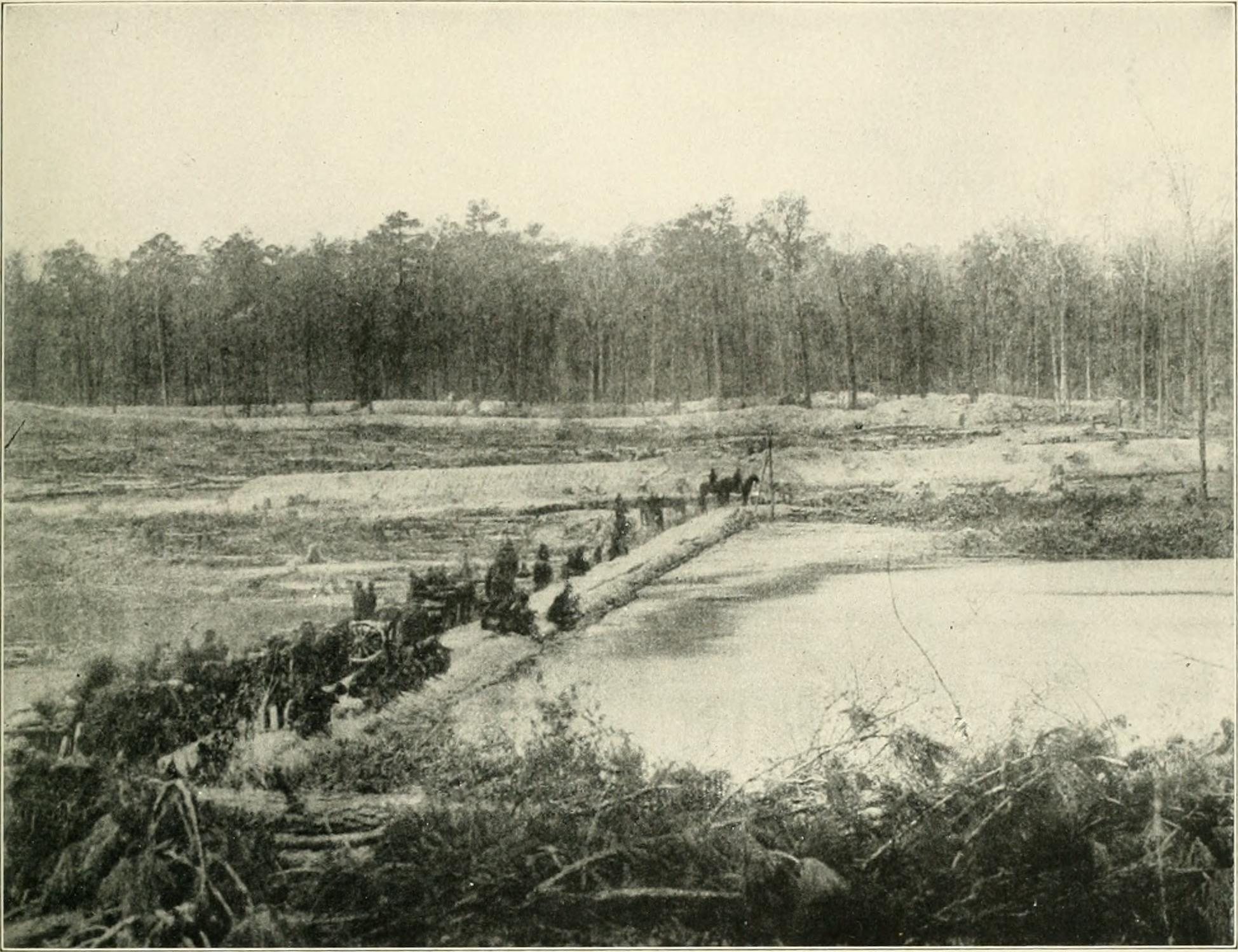
Union troops cross the river in 1862

In 1862, during the Peninsula Campaign of the American Civil War, the Warwick Line, a defensive works across the peninsula, was maintained along the river by Confederate General John B. Magruder against much larger Union forces under General George B. McClellan. Through the use of elaborate ruse tactics, "Prince John" Magruder, who was also an actor, provided valuable time for the ultimately successful defense of Richmond led by General Robert E. Lee which culminated in the Seven Days Battles.

The Warwick River adjoins Fort Eustis, a U.S. Army base, on its western shore, which also occupies historic Mulberry Island. During the 20th century, upper reaches of the river were dammed to create fresh water reservoirs for Newport News Waterworks which serves several local communities.

== See also ==
- List of Virginia rivers
