= Wilson Miles Cary =

American politician (1733–1817)

Wilson-Miles Cary
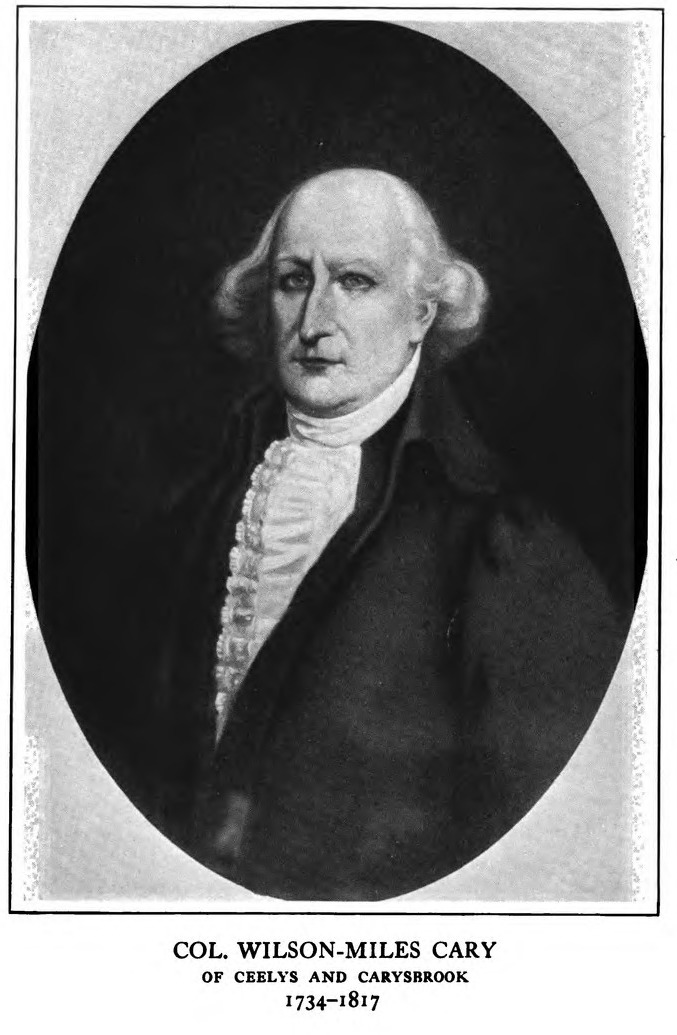
- Wilson Miles Cary

Member of the Virginia House of Delegates from Elizabeth City County
- In office November 10, 1795 – December 27, 1796 Serving with Miles King
- Preceded by: George Wray
- Succeeded by: George Booker

Member of the Virginia House of Delegates from Warwick County
- In office May 5, 1783 – January 11, 1787 Serving with Cole Digges, John Langhorne, Richard Cary Jr.
- Preceded by: Edward Harwood
- Succeeded by: John Scarsbrooke Langhorne

Member of the Virginia House of Delegates from Fluvanna County
- In office May 5, 1777 – December 21, 1778 Serving with Thomas Napier
- Succeeded by: George Thompson

Member of the Virginia House of Delegates from Elizabeth City County
- In office October 7, 1776 – December 21, 1776 Serving with Henry King
- Succeeded by: Miles King; Worlich Westwood

Member of the Virginia House of Burgesses from Elizabeth City County
- In office 1766–1772 Serving with George Wythe, James Wallace
- Preceded by: William Wager
- Succeeded by: Henry King; Worlich Westwood

Personal details
- Born: 1733 Richneck Plantation, Warwick County, Colony of Virginia
- Died: 25 November 1817 (aged 83–84) Carysbrook Plantation, Fluvanna County, Virginia
- Party: Federalist
- Spouses: Sarah Blair (m. 1759; died 1799); Rebecca Dawson (m. 1802)
- Children: 3 daughters and 2 sons
- Relatives: Miles Cary II (grandfather); Miles Cary (great grandfather)
- Education: College of William and Mary
- Occupation: Naval officer; magistrate; planter; politician

Wilson-Miles Cary (1733 – November 30, 1817) was an American politician from Virginia. A prominent patriot in the American Revolutionary War and once one of the wealthiest men in the Colony of Virginia, Cary served in the Virginia House of Burgesses and later the Virginia House of Delegates as a Federalist who represented at various times Warwick County, Elizabeth City County (modern Hampton) and the newly created Fluvanna County. Cary also built Carysbrook Plantation in Fluvanna County, where he died in the household of his grandson Wilson Jefferson Cary (who would continue the family's legislative tradition five years later).

== Early life ==
Wilson-Miles Cary was born into the First Families of Virginia, on Richneck Plantation. He was the son of Sarah and Wilson Cary and the grandson of Miles Cary II, a politician who owned plantations in Warwick County and Elizabeth City County. Cary was educated at the College of William and Mary.

== Career ==
Cary began his public career in 1757, when he became one of the justices of the peace for Warwick County, as well as won election to the Warwick Parish vestry. The next year he accepted the position of lieutenant colonel in the local militia, and in 1761 succeeded his father as naval officer for the lower district of the James River (a lucrative customs post).

In 1762, Cary moved his family eastward on the major road connecting Williamsburg and the great Hampton Roads port, into Elizabeth City County. They resided at what was called Ceelys on the James (after a family that owned the area in the late 17th century). Cary became a justice of the peace of the Elizabeth City County court, and would serve for nearly four decades (the justices collectively ruling counties in that era). Cary also became colonel of its militia. Cary was Anglican, and was elected in 1767 to be a vestryman of St. John's in Elizabeth City Parish.

Elizabeth City County voters elected Cary to succeed burgess William Wager, and Cary served alongside his probable teacher George Wythe until 1769, when James Wallace succeeded Wythe, then Cary and Wallace jointly served as Elizabeth City's burgesses until 1772. Cary resumed his legislative service during the American Revolutionary War, serving in the final revolutionary convention May 6 – July 6, 1776 alongside Henry King, then King and Cary jointly represented Elizabeth City County in the first session of the Virginia House of Delegates that began on October 7, 1776. Then as Wythe became speaker of the House of Delegates, Cary began representing newly created Fluvanna County, and was re-elected along with Thomas Napier until 1778.

During the American Revolutionary War, as a consequence of Cary being a supporter of the patriot cause and the owner of a large number of slaves at several different plantations, his plantations were frequently raided by the British. At least 24 slaves left with the British after they came to Richneck Plantation.

After a year of no legislative service for Cary, Elizabeth City County voters elected him in 1780 as one of their delegates, but he was declared ineligible because of nonresidence. In as late as 1782, in the Virginia Census, Cary is listed as the owner of over 280 slaves. In 1783, Warwick County voters elected Cary as one of their delegates, and he won re-election twice, serving alongside two different neighbors until succeeded by his son (who did not win re-election). Cary again won re-election as one of Elizabeth City County's delegates in 1795 and re-election. Although his name is often written with a hyphen, the hyphen is absent from some contemporary records, including surviving Warwick County records. His great-grandson of the same names (who fought as a captain in the Confederate States Army and who later donated papers to the University of Virginia Library's Special Collections) did not hyphenate his name.
