= Monfalcone (disambiguation) =

Monfalcone is a coastal town in Northern Italy, on the Gulf of Trieste.

Monfalcone may also refer to:

- Monfalcone railway station
- A.S.D. Unione Fincantieri Monfalcone, a soccer team in Monfalcone
- Alfred M. Monfalcone, mayor of Newport News, Virginia in 1956
- Monfalcon di Montanaia, a mountain in Italy

== See also ==
- Montefalcone (disambiguation)
