= Richneck Plantation =

Archaeological site in Virginia, United States

- Richneck Plantation Archeological Site
- U.S. National Register of Historic Places
- Virginia Landmarks Register
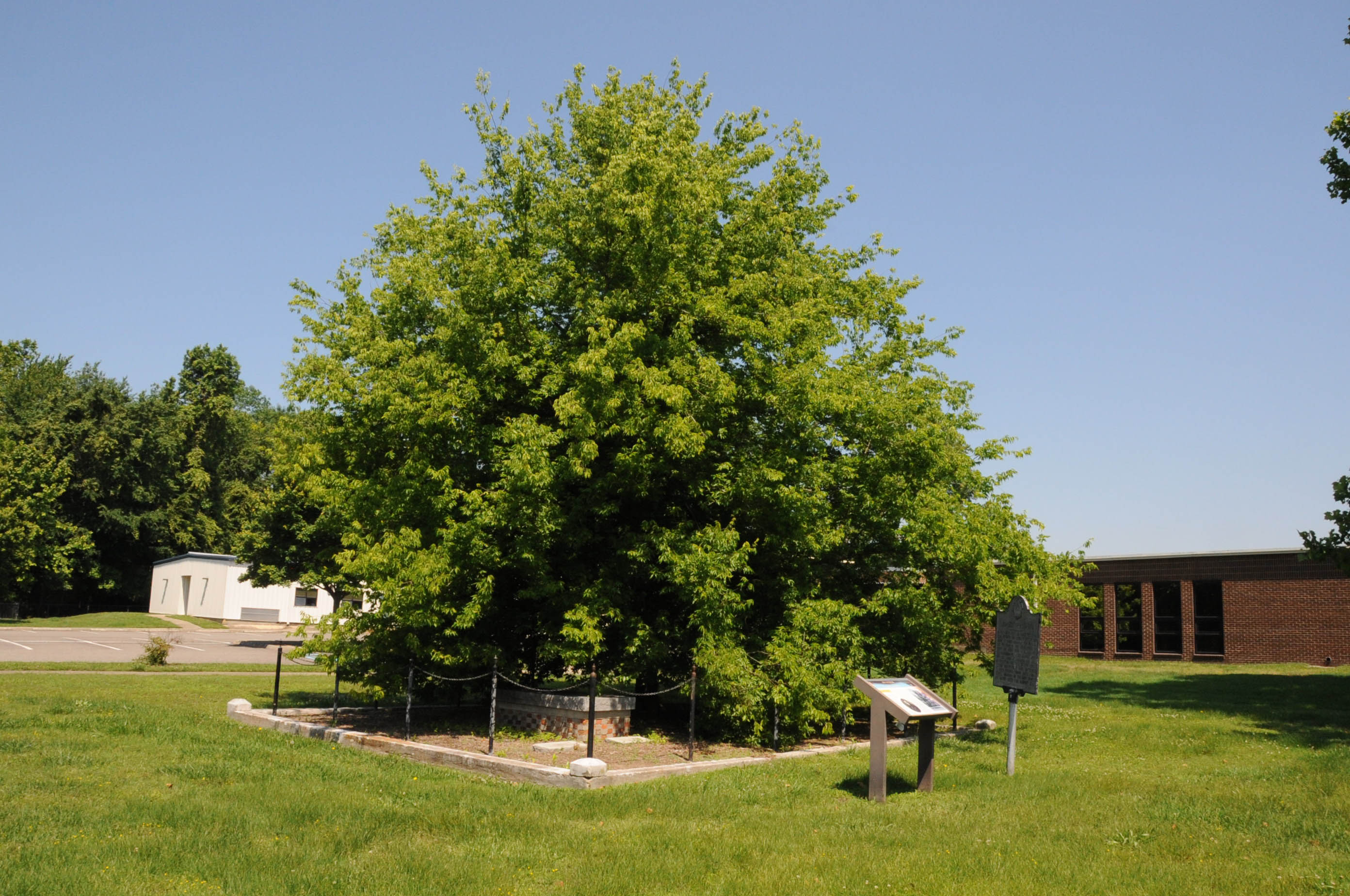

- Location within Virginia Location within the United States
- Interactive map of Richneck Plantation Archeological Site
- Location: 185 Richneck Road, Newport News, Virginia
- Coordinates: 37°8′48.4″N 76°31′44.7″W
- Area: 2.7 acres (1.1 ha)
- NRHP reference No.: 77001535
- VLR No.: 121-0028

Significant dates
- Added to NRHP: July 8, 1977
- Designated VLR: February 17, 1976

Richneck Plantation was a property in colonial Virginia, located on the Virginia Peninsula on the northern shore of the James River between Hampton Roads and Jamestown. The Richneck manor house's foundation was discovered during construction of the George J. McIntosh elementary school (named for a modern Newport News educator), and became an archeological dig, then listed on the National Register of Historic Places.

The earliest proprietor of Richneck Plantation was Robert Rich, second Earl of Warwick and a prominent member of the Virginia Company. The Warwick River, Warwick River Shire, and Warwick County were all named for him. Warwick Towne was the first county seat, succeeded by this plantation under Miles Cary, discussed below.

In 1628, Zachariah Cripps patented this area, and later sold the land to Miles Cary Sr., who lived nearby at Windmill Point. After he died repelling Dutch invaders in 1667, it was inherited by his son Miles Cary (1655-1709), who after he came of age, constructed a manor house and lived there with his wife, Mary Milner, and family. Richneck became one of the most important plantations of the Cary family, one of the First Families of Virginia, with many members who served in legislative and government offices. It was successively inherited by Col. Wilson Cary (1703-1772) and his son Col. Wilson Miles Cary (1734-1817), both of whom successively served as legislators, as well as naval officers for the Lower James River before the American Revolutionary War. Wilson Miles Cary signed the Association of 1774 and sided with the patriots during the American Revolutionary War. They also farmed using enslaved labor. The Richneck plantation house burned in 1865, at the end of the American Civil War, and visited by a descendant, Wilson Miles Cary in 1868.

Richneck Road remains in the Denbigh area of the modern independent city of Newport News, Virginia.

== See also ==
- James River Plantations
- Newport News, Virginia
- List of former United States counties
- Warwick County, Virginia
