= Warwick River Shire =

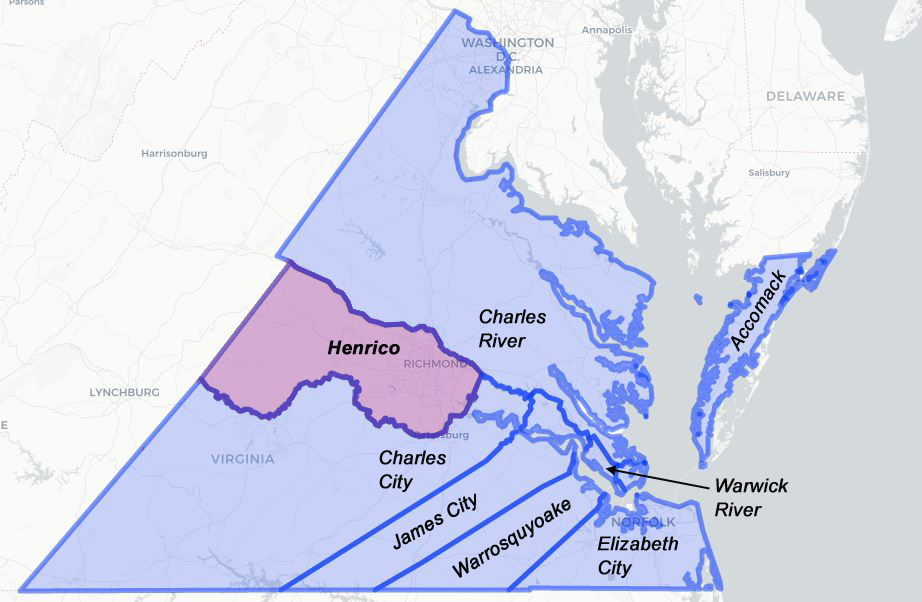
Map of the shires of Virginia, 1634

Warwick River Shire was one of eight shires created in colonial Virginia in 1634. It was located on the Virginia Peninsula on the northern shore of the James River between Hampton Roads and the Jamestown Settlement.

During the 17th century, shortly after establishment of Jamestown in 1607, English settlers had explored and began settling the areas adjacent to Hampton Roads. By 1634, the English colony of Virginia consisted of eight shires or counties with a total population of approximately 5,000 inhabitants.

Warwick River Shire took its name from Robert Rich, second Earl of Warwick and a prominent member of the Virginia Company. Warwick River Shire became Warwick County in 1643. Rich's Richneck Plantation was located in the modern day independent city of Newport News, Virginia.

Up until the Virginia Statute for Religious Freedom of 1786 disestablished the Church of England in Virginia, Warwick River Shire included the Anglican Parishes of Blunt Poynt (Blount Point), Denbigh, Mulberry Island, Nutmeg Quarter, Stanley Hundred, Warwick, and Waters Creek. The parishes served as local units of government and religious and community organizations. Many of the original parish names have survived as neighborhood names in modern times.

== See also ==
- Warwick County, Virginia
- Newport News, Virginia
- List of former United States counties
- Queen Hith Plantation Complex Site
- Richneck Plantation
- Stanley Hundred
- Boldrup Plantation Archeological Site
- First Denbigh Parish Church Archeological Site
- Denbigh Plantation
