= T. Parker Host =

American shipping company

T. Parker Host is a New Orleans-based shipping company founded in 1923 by T. Parker Host Sr. The company operates or owns over thirty sea, docking and stevedoring sites. The company maintains more than 15 locations across the eastern United States and serves in North America and Colombia. Host is one of the largest bulk agents in the United States.

== Purchases and partnerships ==
In 2016, the company became the exclusive marine terminal operator for Tradepoint Atlantic, a 3,300-acre global logistics center in Baltimore, Maryland. They signed a 10-year agreement for Host Terminals to oversee all of the marine cargo operations at the Baltimore County site.

In 2017, the company acquired CWT commodities to form Host Logistics.

In 2018, they partnered with Hilco Global to purchase the former site of the Avondale Shipyard in Jefferson Parish, Louisiana which includes over 7900 feet of deep water riverfront access. In 2020, they were awarded over $9.8 million from the U.S. Department of Transportation towards the remodeling of the Avondale Shipyard into a modern cargo dock.
