= 1956 United States presidential election in Virginia =

- November 6, 1956

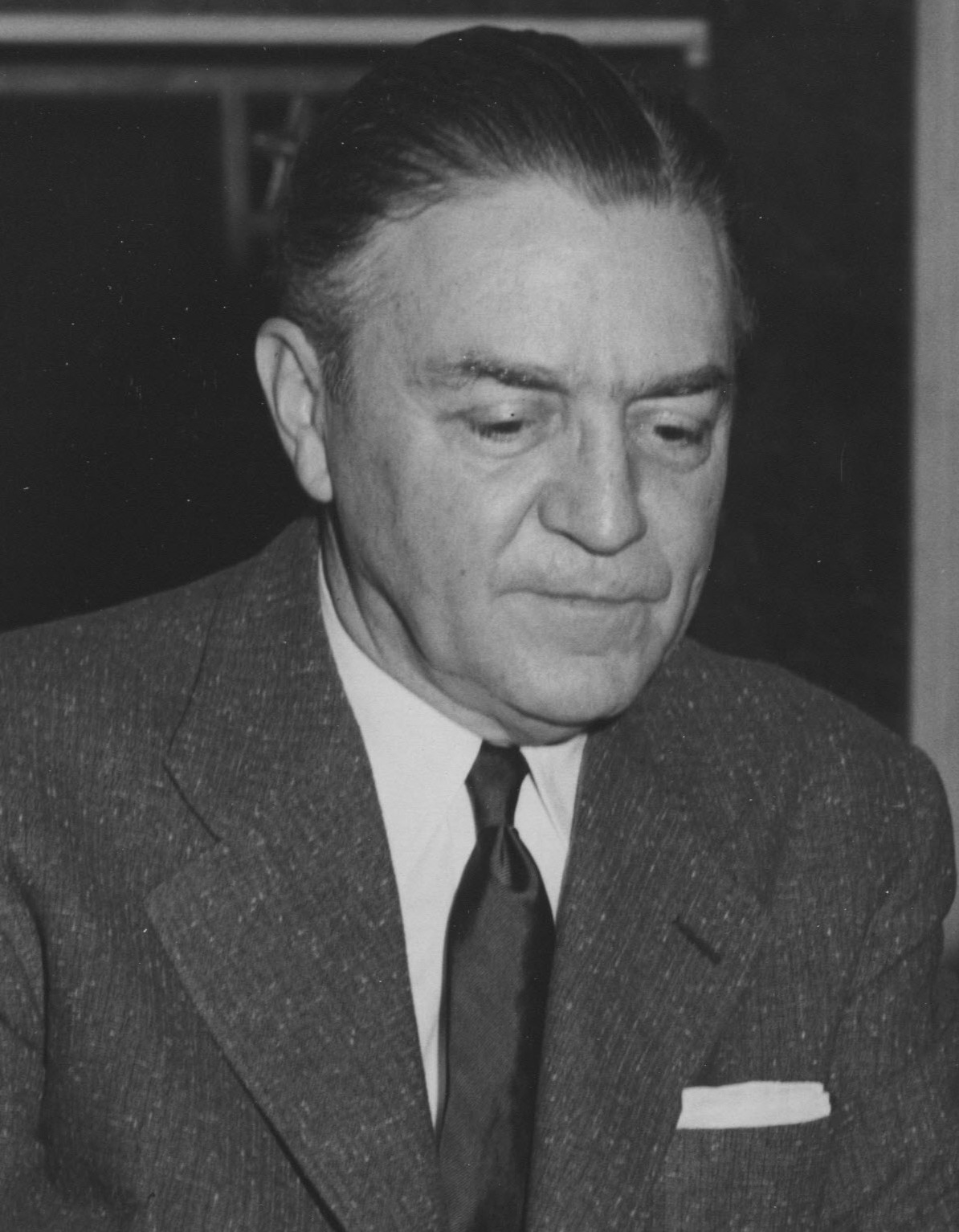
Nominee	Dwight D. Eisenhower	Adlai Stevenson	T. Coleman Andrews
Party	Republican	Democratic	Dixiecrat
Home state	Pennsylvania (Note: Although he was born in Texas and grew up in Kansas before his military career, at the time of the 1952 election Eisenhower was president of Columbia University and was, officially, a resident of New York. During his first term as president, he moved his private residence to Gettysburg, Pennsylvania, and officially changed his residency to Pennsylvania.)	Illinois	Virginia
Running mate	Richard Nixon	Estes Kefauver	Thomas H. Werdel
Electoral vote	12	0	0
Popular vote	386,459	267,760	42,964
Percentage	55.37%	38.36%	6.16%
County and independent city results
Eisenhower
40–50%
50–60%
60–70%
70–80%
Stevenson
30–40%
40–50%
50–60%
Andrews
50–60%
President before election
Dwight D. Eisenhower
Republican
Elected President
Dwight D. Eisenhower
Republican

The 1956 United States presidential election in Virginia took place on November 6, 1956. Voters chose twelve representatives, or electors to the Electoral College, who voted for president and vice president. For the previous five decades Virginia had almost completely disenfranchised its black and poor white populations through the use of a cumulative poll tax and literacy tests. So restricted was suffrage in this period that it has been calculated that a third of Virginia's electorate during the first half of the twentieth century comprised state employees and officeholders.

This limited electorate allowed Virginian politics to be controlled for four decades by the Byrd Organization, as progressive "antiorganization" factions were rendered impotent by the inability of almost all their potential electorate to vote. Historical fusion with the "Readjuster" Democrats, defection of substantial proportions of the Northeast-aligned white electorate of the Shenandoah Valley and Southwest Virginia over free silver, and an early move towards a "lily white" Jim Crow party meant Republicans retained a small but permanent number of legislative seats and local offices in the western part of the state.

In 1928, the GOP did carry the state's presidential electoral votes due to anti-Catholicism against Al Smith, but it was 1952 before any real changes occurred. In-migration from the traditionally Republican Northeast turned growing Washington, D.C., and Richmond suburbs Republican not just in presidential elections but in congressional ones as well, although the Republicans made no gains in the state legislature where all their few seats remained in the rural west.

1954 saw Virginia's politics severely jolted by Brown v. Board of Education—one of whose component cases Davis v. County School Board of Prince Edward County, originated from a student protest in the state. Despite calls by Governor Thomas B. Stanley for a "calm" and "dispassionate" response, the Byrd machine recognised that segregation could unite most of Virginia's electorate behind it and avert criticism of its other policies. State representative Howard W. Smith played a major role drafting the "Southern Manifesto", which was signed by Virginia's entire congressional delegation, including its two GOP representatives. Although Eisenhower refused to publicly endorse Brown, the fact that he had appointed Brown author Earl Warren meant that there was substantial anger in the Southside, and as in 1948 a "states' rights" ticket, this time headed by Virginian former Commissioner of Internal Revenue T. Coleman Andrews, was filled and placed on the Virginia ballot in mid-September, when a poll said that 28 percent of likely voters would back a states' rights candidate if on the ballot.

== Predictions ==
Source	Ranking	As of
Richmond Times-Dispatch	Tossup	September 16, 1956
The World-News	Likely R	October 12, 1956
The Raleigh Register	Likely R	October 12, 1956
The Philadelphia Inquirer	Likely R	October 26, 1956
The Sunday Star	Tilt D (flip)	October 28, 1956
Fort Worth Star-Telegram	Tilt D (flip)	November 2, 1956
Corpus Christi Times	Tossup	November 3, 1956

== Results ==
1956 United States presidential election in Virginia
Party	Candidate	Votes	Percentage	Electoral votes
Republican	Dwight Eisenhower (inc.)	386,459	55.37%	12
Democratic	Adlai Stevenson	267,760	38.36%	0
States' Rights	T. Coleman Andrews	42,964	6.16%	0
Social Democratic	Darlington Hoopes	444	0.06%	0
Socialist Labor	Eric Hass	351	0.05%	0
Totals		697,978	100.00%	12

=== Results by county or independent city ===
County or city	Dwight D. Eisenhower Republican		Adlai Stevenson Democratic		T. Coleman Andrews States' Rights		Other candidates Various parties		Margin		Total votes cast
County or city	#	%	#	%	#	%	#	%	#	%	Total votes cast
Accomack	2,823	54.25%	2,213	42.52%	162	3.11%	6	0.12%	610	11.73%	5,204
Albemarle	2,508	57.18%	1,412	32.19%	466	10.62%	0	0.00%	1,096	24.99%	4,386
Alexandria	8,633	52.48%	7,451	45.30%	357	2.17%	8	0.05%	1,182	7.18%	16,449
Alleghany	1,135	55.26%	822	40.02%	97	4.72%	0	0.00%	313	15.24%	2,054
Amelia	745	43.11%	403	23.32%	571	33.04%	9	0.52%	174 (Note: In this county or city where Stevenson ran third behind Andrews, margin given is Eisenhower vote minus Andrews vote and percentage given Eisenhower percentage minus Andrews percentage.)	10.07%	1,728
Amherst	1,529	42.59%	1,933	53.84%	124	3.45%	4	0.11%	-404	-11.25%	3,590
Appomattox	853	40.89%	1,079	51.73%	153	7.33%	1	0.05%	-226	-10.84%	2,086
Arlington	21,868	55.05%	16,674	41.97%	1,151	2.90%	32	0.08%	5,194	13.08%	39,725
Augusta	3,466	68.07%	1,484	29.14%	139	2.73%	3	0.06%	1,982	38.93%	5,092
Bath	739	58.47%	479	37.90%	45	3.56%	1	0.08%	260	20.57%	1,264
Bedford	3,148	52.07%	2,649	43.81%	241	3.99%	8	0.13%	499	8.26%	6,046
Bland	1,113	57.16%	813	41.76%	20	1.03%	1	0.05%	300	15.40%	1,947
Botetourt	2,280	60.67%	1,377	36.64%	101	2.69%	0	0.00%	903	24.03%	3,758
Bristol	1,794	51.89%	1,645	47.58%	17	0.49%	1	0.03%	149	4.31%	3,457
Brunswick	799	25.28%	1,357	42.94%	996	31.52%	8	0.25%	361 (Note: In this county or city where Eisenhower ran third behind Andrews, margin given is Stevenson vote minus Andrews vote and percentage margin Stevenson percentage minus Andrews percentage)	11.42%	3,160
Buchanan	3,191	46.71%	3,616	52.94%	21	0.31%	3	0.04%	-425	-6.23%	6,831
Buckingham	751	43.64%	648	37.65%	312	18.13%	10	0.58%	103	5.99%	1,721
Buena Vista	545	60.76%	326	36.34%	24	2.68%	2	0.22%	219	24.42%	897
Campbell	2,827	47.79%	2,674	45.20%	401	6.78%	14	0.24%	153	2.59%	5,916
Caroline	907	46.06%	853	43.32%	202	10.26%	7	0.36%	54	2.74%	1,969
Carroll	4,060	69.66%	1,739	29.84%	24	0.41%	5	0.09%	2,321	39.82%	5,828
Charles City	661	72.08%	174	18.97%	79	8.62%	3	0.33%	487	53.11%	917
Charlotte	791	27.86%	1,431	50.41%	605	21.31%	12	0.42%	-640	-22.55%	2,839
Charlottesville	3,746	62.19%	1,783	29.60%	490	8.14%	4	0.07%	1,963	32.59%	6,023
Chesterfield	5,787	53.12%	3,306	30.35%	1,791	16.44%	10	0.09%	2,481	22.77%	10,894
Clarke	785	48.91%	725	45.17%	95	5.92%	0	0.00%	60	3.74%	1,605
Clifton Forge	1,125	61.48%	633	34.59%	71	3.88%	1	0.05%	492	26.89%	1,830
Colonial Heights	1,037	47.74%	956	44.01%	177	8.15%	2	0.09%	81	3.73%	2,172
Covington	1,639	56.34%	1,189	40.87%	79	2.72%	2	0.07%	450	15.47%	2,909
Craig	485	48.84%	501	50.45%	7	0.70%	0	0.00%	-16	-1.61%	993
Culpeper	1,502	56.44%	966	36.30%	188	7.07%	5	0.19%	536	20.14%	2,661
Cumberland	566	42.91%	331	25.09%	416	31.54%	6	0.45%	150	11.37%	1,319
Danville	4,561	59.03%	2,409	31.18%	740	9.58%	16	0.21%	2,152	27.85%	7,726
Dickenson	3,444	48.15%	3,695	51.66%	8	0.11%	6	0.08%	-251	-3.51%	7,153
Dinwiddie	807	30.71%	1,282	48.78%	524	19.94%	15	0.57%	-475	-18.07%	2,628
Essex	597	55.48%	328	30.48%	149	13.85%	2	0.19%	269	25.00%	1,076
Fairfax	20,761	55.71%	15,633	41.95%	862	2.31%	11	0.03%	5,128	13.76%	37,267
Falls Church	1,462	53.13%	1,233	44.80%	55	2.00%	2	0.07%	229	8.33%	2,752
Fauquier	2,112	55.55%	1,567	41.22%	122	3.21%	1	0.03%	545	14.33%	3,802
Floyd	1,970	70.46%	799	28.58%	25	0.89%	2	0.07%	1,171	41.88%	2,796
Fluvanna	734	53.85%	417	30.59%	208	15.26%	4	0.29%	317	23.26%	1,363
Franklin	2,125	48.81%	2,142	49.20%	84	1.93%	3	0.07%	-17	-0.39%	4,354
Frederick	1,882	56.01%	1,405	41.82%	71	2.11%	2	0.06%	477	14.19%	3,360
Fredericksburg	1,672	60.25%	934	33.66%	168	6.05%	1	0.04%	738	26.59%	2,775
Galax	761	68.31%	346	31.06%	7	0.63%	0	0.00%	415	37.25%	1,114
Giles	2,270	51.84%	2,016	46.04%	81	1.85%	12	0.27%	254	5.80%	4,379
Gloucester	1,319	57.95%	723	31.77%	223	9.80%	11	0.48%	596	26.18%	2,276
Goochland	748	50.10%	508	34.03%	233	15.61%	4	0.27%	240	16.07%	1,493
Grayson	4,039	62.18%	2,426	37.35%	26	0.40%	5	0.08%	1,613	24.83%	6,496
Greene	539	63.49%	246	28.98%	63	7.42%	1	0.12%	293	34.51%	849
Greensville	724	29.08%	994	39.92%	760	30.52%	12	0.48%	234	9.40%	2,490
Halifax	1,782	30.73%	2,470	42.59%	1,513	26.09%	34	0.59%	-688	-11.86%	5,799
Hampton	7,432	57.24%	5,108	39.34%	421	3.24%	22	0.17%	2,324	17.90%	12,983
Hanover	2,272	54.07%	1,109	26.39%	813	19.35%	8	0.19%	1,163	27.68%	4,202
Harrisonburg	2,265	78.29%	571	19.74%	56	1.94%	1	0.03%	1,694	58.55%	2,893
Henrico	12,702	60.20%	5,032	23.85%	3,354	15.89%	13	0.06%	7,670	36.35%	21,101
Henry	2,436	47.75%	2,582	50.61%	75	1.47%	9	0.18%	-146	-2.86%	5,102
Highland	633	58.02%	432	39.60%	23	2.11%	3	0.27%	201	18.42%	1,091
Hopewell	1,908	53.91%	1,388	39.22%	235	6.64%	8	0.23%	520	14.69%	3,539
Isle of Wight	1,298	47.08%	1,324	48.02%	131	4.75%	4	0.15%	-26	-0.94%	2,757
James City	728	62.54%	312	26.80%	122	10.48%	2	0.17%	416	35.74%	1,164
King and Queen	495	54.64%	289	31.90%	116	12.80%	6	0.66%	206	22.74%	906
King George	655	51.70%	563	44.44%	47	3.71%	2	0.16%	92	7.26%	1,267
King William	887	62.16%	357	25.02%	180	12.61%	3	0.21%	530	37.14%	1,427
Lancaster	1,380	70.66%	373	19.10%	192	9.83%	8	0.41%	1,007	51.56%	1,953
Lee	4,548	54.77%	3,714	44.73%	30	0.36%	12	0.14%	834	10.04%	8,304
Loudoun	2,489	53.41%	1,960	42.06%	205	4.40%	6	0.13%	529	11.35%	4,660
Louisa	1,152	47.43%	795	32.73%	472	19.43%	10	0.41%	357	14.70%	2,429
Lunenburg	580	24.80%	1,111	47.50%	641	27.40%	7	0.30%	470	20.10%	2,339
Lynchburg	6,806	64.81%	3,362	32.01%	329	3.13%	5	0.05%	3,444	32.80%	10,502
Madison	850	56.86%	533	35.65%	111	7.42%	1	0.07%	317	21.21%	1,495
Martinsville	2,125	59.67%	1,368	38.42%	65	1.83%	3	0.08%	757	21.25%	3,561
Mathews	1,018	65.42%	406	26.09%	132	8.48%	0	0.00%	612	39.33%	1,556
Mecklenburg	1,498	33.78%	2,004	45.20%	920	20.75%	12	0.27%	-506	-11.42%	4,434
Middlesex	721	58.00%	338	27.19%	180	14.48%	4	0.32%	383	30.81%	1,243
Montgomery	4,598	70.10%	1,848	28.18%	106	1.62%	7	0.11%	2,750	41.92%	6,559
Nansemond	1,753	40.21%	2,492	57.16%	98	2.25%	17	0.39%	-739	-16.95%	4,360
Nelson	764	37.20%	1,215	59.15%	73	3.55%	2	0.10%	-451	-21.95%	2,054
New Kent	510	57.95%	178	20.23%	189	21.48%	3	0.34%	321	36.47%	880
Newport News	3,779	53.26%	3,069	43.26%	237	3.34%	10	0.14%	710	10.00%	7,095
Norfolk	4,558	41.74%	6,026	55.18%	332	3.04%	4	0.04%	-1,468	-13.44%	10,920
Norfolk City	18,650	54.02%	14,571	42.20%	1,285	3.72%	19	0.06%	4,079	11.82%	34,525
Northampton	1,264	51.03%	1,132	45.70%	78	3.15%	3	0.12%	132	5.33%	2,477
Northumberland	1,191	62.68%	428	22.53%	277	14.58%	4	0.21%	763	40.15%	1,900
Norton	684	55.12%	552	44.48%	4	0.32%	1	0.08%	132	10.64%	1,241
Nottoway	1,124	33.76%	1,242	37.31%	961	28.87%	2	0.06%	-118	-3.55%	3,329
Orange	1,344	53.55%	794	31.63%	363	14.46%	9	0.36%	550	21.92%	2,510
Page	2,372	62.73%	1,358	35.92%	49	1.30%	2	0.05%	1,014	26.81%	3,781
Patrick	1,345	43.93%	1,677	54.77%	38	1.24%	2	0.07%	-332	-10.84%	3,062
Petersburg	3,166	58.10%	1,882	34.54%	395	7.25%	6	0.11%	1,284	23.56%	5,449
Pittsylvania	2,870	36.82%	4,136	53.07%	767	9.84%	21	0.27%	-1,266	-16.25%	7,794
Portsmouth	5,390	47.13%	5,683	49.69%	348	3.04%	15	0.13%	-293	-2.56%	11,436
Powhatan	729	54.08%	297	22.03%	314	23.29%	8	0.59%	415	30.79%	1,348
Prince Edward	932	31.43%	437	14.74%	1,588	53.56%	8	0.27%	-656	-22.13%	2,965
Prince George	689	46.24%	642	43.09%	149	10.00%	10	0.67%	47	3.15%	1,490
Princess Anne	4,675	50.52%	4,342	46.93%	227	2.45%	9	0.10%	333	3.59%	9,253
Prince William	2,023	50.96%	1,851	46.62%	95	2.39%	1	0.03%	172	4.34%	3,970
Pulaski	3,517	63.05%	1,994	35.75%	65	1.17%	2	0.04%	1,523	27.30%	5,578
Radford	1,910	62.46%	1,118	36.56%	28	0.92%	2	0.07%	792	25.90%	3,058
Rappahannock	514	47.81%	523	48.65%	35	3.26%	3	0.28%	-9	-0.84%	1,075
Richmond	761	67.89%	274	24.44%	85	7.58%	1	0.09%	487	43.45%	1,121
Richmond City	27,367	61.79%	10,758	24.29%	6,136	13.85%	30	0.07%	16,609	37.50%	44,291
Roanoke	7,509	69.83%	2,899	26.96%	342	3.18%	3	0.03%	4,610	42.87%	10,753
Roanoke City	16,708	69.38%	6,751	28.03%	611	2.54%	12	0.05%	9,957	41.35%	24,082
Rockbridge	2,273	66.50%	1,039	30.40%	106	3.10%	0	0.00%	1,234	36.10%	3,418
Rockingham	4,324	71.74%	1,605	26.63%	93	1.54%	5	0.08%	2,719	45.11%	6,027
Russell	3,550	49.14%	3,641	50.40%	25	0.35%	8	0.11%	-91	-1.26%	7,224
Scott	5,116	58.44%	3,595	41.07%	36	0.41%	7	0.08%	1,521	17.37%	8,754
Shenandoah	4,164	69.18%	1,769	29.39%	84	1.40%	2	0.03%	2,395	39.79%	6,019
Smyth	4,771	66.23%	2,374	32.95%	56	0.78%	3	0.04%	2,397	33.28%	7,204
South Norfolk	1,521	42.14%	1,871	51.84%	212	5.87%	5	0.14%	-350	-9.70%	3,609
Southampton	1,290	35.29%	2,039	55.79%	317	8.67%	9	0.25%	-749	-20.50%	3,655
Spotsylvania	1,244	51.94%	993	41.46%	154	6.43%	4	0.17%	251	10.48%	2,395
Stafford	1,563	58.94%	978	36.88%	109	4.11%	2	0.08%	585	22.06%	2,652
Staunton	2,908	74.93%	843	21.72%	129	3.32%	1	0.03%	2,065	53.21%	3,881
Suffolk	1,617	57.50%	1,103	39.22%	88	3.13%	4	0.14%	514	18.28%	2,812
Surry	425	32.52%	616	47.13%	259	19.82%	7	0.54%	-191	-14.61%	1,307
Sussex	785	39.31%	851	42.61%	357	17.88%	4	0.20%	-66	-3.30%	1,997
Tazewell	3,960	52.55%	3,495	46.38%	75	1.00%	5	0.07%	465	6.17%	7,535
Virginia Beach	1,355	53.28%	1,111	43.69%	63	2.48%	14	0.55%	244	9.59%	2,543
Warren	2,003	58.83%	1,322	38.83%	77	2.26%	3	0.09%	681	20.00%	3,405
Warwick	4,872	56.39%	3,406	39.42%	352	4.07%	10	0.12%	1,466	16.97%	8,640
Washington	4,651	56.38%	3,547	42.99%	45	0.55%	7	0.08%	1,104	13.39%	8,250
Waynesboro	2,049	71.00%	748	25.92%	89	3.08%	0	0.00%	1,301	45.08%	2,886
Westmoreland	1,033	54.45%	695	36.64%	167	8.80%	2	0.11%	338	17.81%	1,897
Williamsburg	775	62.60%	362	29.24%	99	8.00%	2	0.16%	413	33.36%	1,238
Winchester	2,375	69.46%	945	27.64%	96	2.81%	3	0.09%	1,430	41.82%	3,419
Wise	4,871	46.41%	5,567	53.04%	51	0.49%	6	0.06%	-696	-6.63%	10,495
Wythe	3,484	65.65%	1,766	33.28%	56	1.06%	1	0.02%	1,718	32.37%	5,307
York	1,759	60.10%	1,064	36.35%	100	3.42%	4	0.14%	695	23.75%	2,927
Totals	386,459	55.37%	267,760	38.36%	42,964	6.16%	795	0.11%	118,699	17.01%	697,978

==== Counties and independent cities that flipped from Democratic to Republican ====
- Campbell
- Caroline
- Buckingham
- Charles City
- Goochland
- Hopewell
- Newport News
- Prince George
- Prince William
- Spotsylvania

==== Counties and independent cities that flipped from Republican to Democratic ====
- Nottoway
- Rappahannock

==== Counties and independent cities that flipped from Republican to Unpledged ====
- Prince Edward

== Analysis ==
Despite the doubts of the Sunday Star and Fort Worth Star-Telegram, Virginia voted for the Republican nominee, incumbent President Dwight Eisenhower, over the Democratic nominee, former Illinois Governor Adlai Stevenson and States' Rights Party nominee Andrews. Eisenhower ultimately won the national election with 57.37 percent of the vote.

Although Andrews cut into support for both candidates, Eisenhower improved upon his 1952 margin over Stevenson, although the state was marginally less Republican relative to the nation than in 1952. Andrews' support was centered in the Southside, and he won an absolute majority in Prince Edward County, the epicenter of "Massive Resistance" to school integration and the home of his state chairman Robert B. Crawford. Andrews was nonetheless a weak candidate and poor campaigner, limiting severely his ability to attract segregationists dissatisfied with both major parties.

The major change from 1952 was a rapid trend of the modest but growing black electorate towards Eisenhower: whereas in 1952 he had won less than a quarter of black voters in Richmond and Norfolk, it is believed he won over three-quarters in 1956.
