= Oscar J. Brittingham Jr. =

American politician (1906–1985)

Mayor of Newport News
- In office 1958–1962
- Preceded by: Robert B. Smith
- Succeeded by: Donald M. Hyatt

Oscar Jerome "Jerry" Brittingham Jr. (April 26, 1906 – March 15, 1985) was the mayor of Newport News, Virginia from July 1, 1958 to June 30, 1962. Brittingham served as the first mayor of the city following its consolidation with the city of Warwick. The official consolidation took place on the day Brittingham became mayor. In May 1962, Brittingham saw the city's new Victory Arch dedicated. The establishment of Christopher Newport College came late in his term.

Aside from his political career, Brittingham owned a sheet metal company.

Preceded by Robert B. Smith	Mayor of Newport News; 1958–1962	Succeeded by Donald M. Hyatt
