= Montefalcone =

Montefalcone may refer to one of the following comuni in Italy:

- Montefalcone Appennino, in the province of Ascoli Piceno
- Montefalcone di Val Fortore, in the province of Benevento
- Montefalcone nel Sannio, in the province of Campobasso

Montefalcone (it) is also the name of a natural reserve in the province of Pisa

== See also ==
- Monfalcone (disambiguation)
