= T. Parker Host Sr. =

American politician (1892–1963)

Mayor of Newport News
- In office 1940–1942
- Preceded by: B. G. James
- Succeeded by: R. Cowles Taylor

Thomas Parker Host Sr. (1892–1963) was the mayor of Newport News, Virginia from September 3, 1940 to February 13, 1942. Prior to serving as mayor, he was the founder and owner of T. Parker Host, Inc., a maritime management company that served as an agent for liner services transporting goods through the ports of Hampton Roads. This company is now run by his son, T. Parker Host Jr., and grandsons Tom and David.

Preceded by B. G. James	Mayor of Newport News; 1940–1942	Succeeded by R. Cowles Taylor
