= Stanley Hundred =

Historic Virginia plantation

Coordinates: 37°06′23″N 76°34′9″W

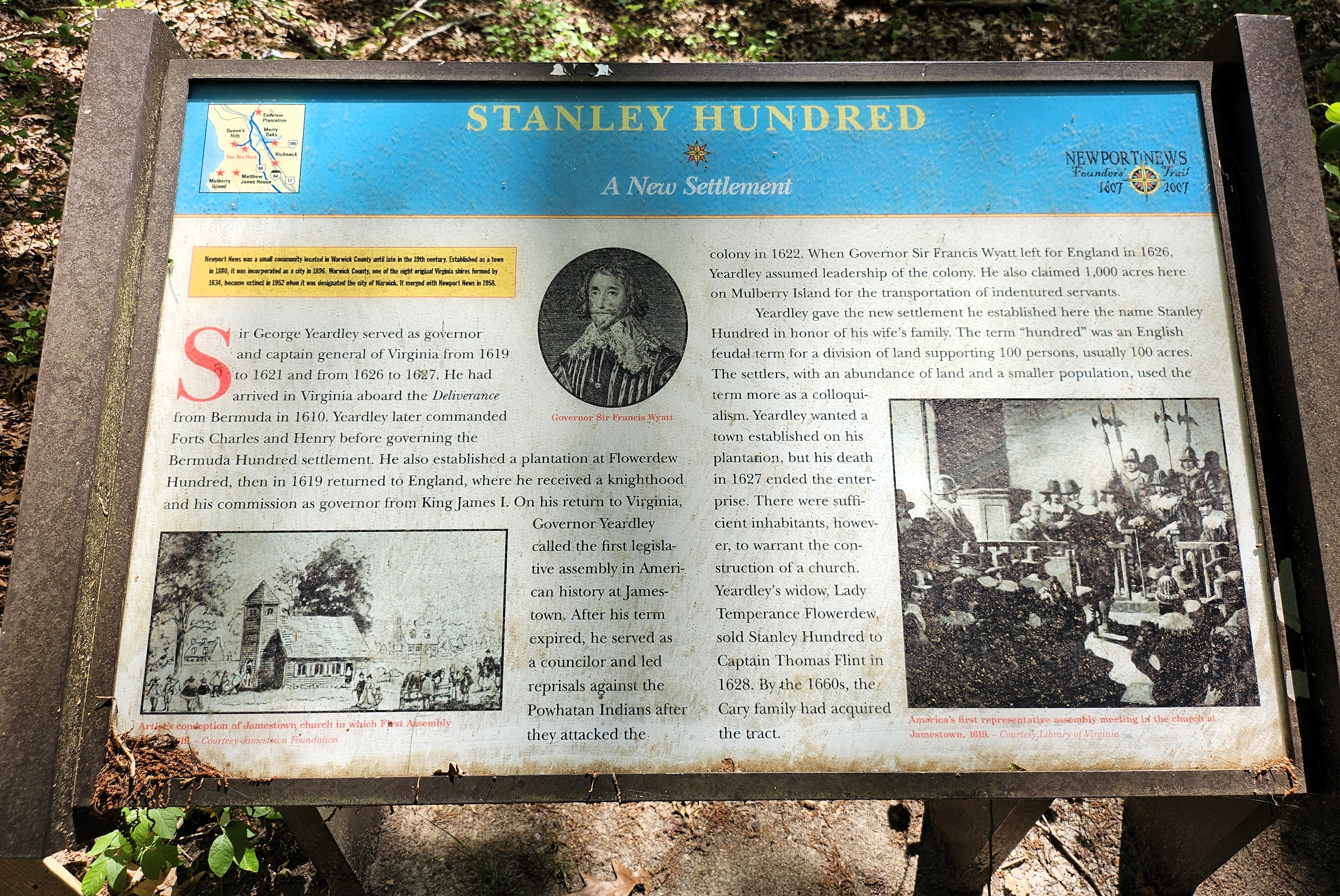
Stanley Hundred historical marker

Stanley Hundred is the name given by Sir George Yeardley around 1626 to the plantation in what would later be part of Warwick River Shire. The name was also used to refer to the corresponding colonial parish in the same area.

The earliest known English settlement in the area came in 1617 or 1618 when indentured servants arrived on 1000 acres of land on Mulberry Island. Despite the plantation’s vastness, its population was small enough to have no representative at the House of Burgesses’ first session in 1619. The English Crown issued the first patent for land on Mulberry Island in 1619.

It is possible that Sir George Yeardley held the 1,000 acre parcel on the south end of Mulberry Island, which would be known as Stanley Hundred as early as 1621, based on land patents. However, the early growth of the Mulberry Island settlement ended with the 1622 Indian uprising. “The numbers that were slaine in those severall Plantations” included six persons at Mulberry Island: Master Thomas Peirce, his wife, his child, John Hopkins, John Samon, and a “French boy” The remaining men, women, and children who survived the attack abandoned Mulberry Island at that time. By 1625 however, settlers returned to Mulberry Island armed with 42 swords, 27 guns, and 22 pieces of armor. The 1624/5 Muster noted 30 people among 13 households.

== Other Owners ==
Sir George Yeardley died on 12 November 1627 and his widow sold his land in Stanley Hundred on 9 February 1628 to a Lieutenant Thomas Flint. Thomas Flint obtained patent on this land on 20 September 1628. Thomas and Mary Flint conveyed their title to the 1,000 acres in Stanley Hundred to a merchant named John Brewer in January 1629. At this point in time Stanley Hundred had enough residents to send two men to represent the area at the House of Burgesses, including John Brewer. Brewer then became a member of the Virginia Governor's Council in 1632 and served until his death in 1635. John Brewer, son of John and Mary Brewer, inherited the “plantation in Virginia called Stawley Hundred als Bruers Borough” after the death of his father. The second John Brewer served as a Burgess for Isle of Wight County in 1657 and 1658. He died intestate in 1669. His nephew and namesake, John Brewer, was to next to gain possession of Stanley Hundred, now encompassing 1300 acres of land. He decided to sell the land in 1713, purchased by a Charles Doyley. The Roscow family gained possession of Stanley Hundred sometime between 1713 and 1770. James Roscow placed an announcement about the sale of his Warwick County land in the 17 January 1777 edition of Purdie’s Virginia Gazette.

== Later History ==
Although all residents of Warwick County were part of one parish after 1726, the justices of the peace continued to use the names “Mulberry Island” and “Stanley Hundred” when they appointed men to serve in various county offices up to 1761 and possibly later. Stanley Hundred and Mulberry Island were part of a smaller community within the larger Warwick County community. On 7 March 1918, the US Army bought the entirety of Mulberry Island (including the area of Stanley Hundred) and the surrounding land for $538,000 as part of the military build-up for World War I. It remains as part of Joint Base Langley–Eustis in 2024.

== See also ==
- Mulberry Island
- Warwick River Shire
- Warwick County, Virginia
- Newport News, Virginia
