= 1948 United States presidential election in Virginia =

- November 2, 1948

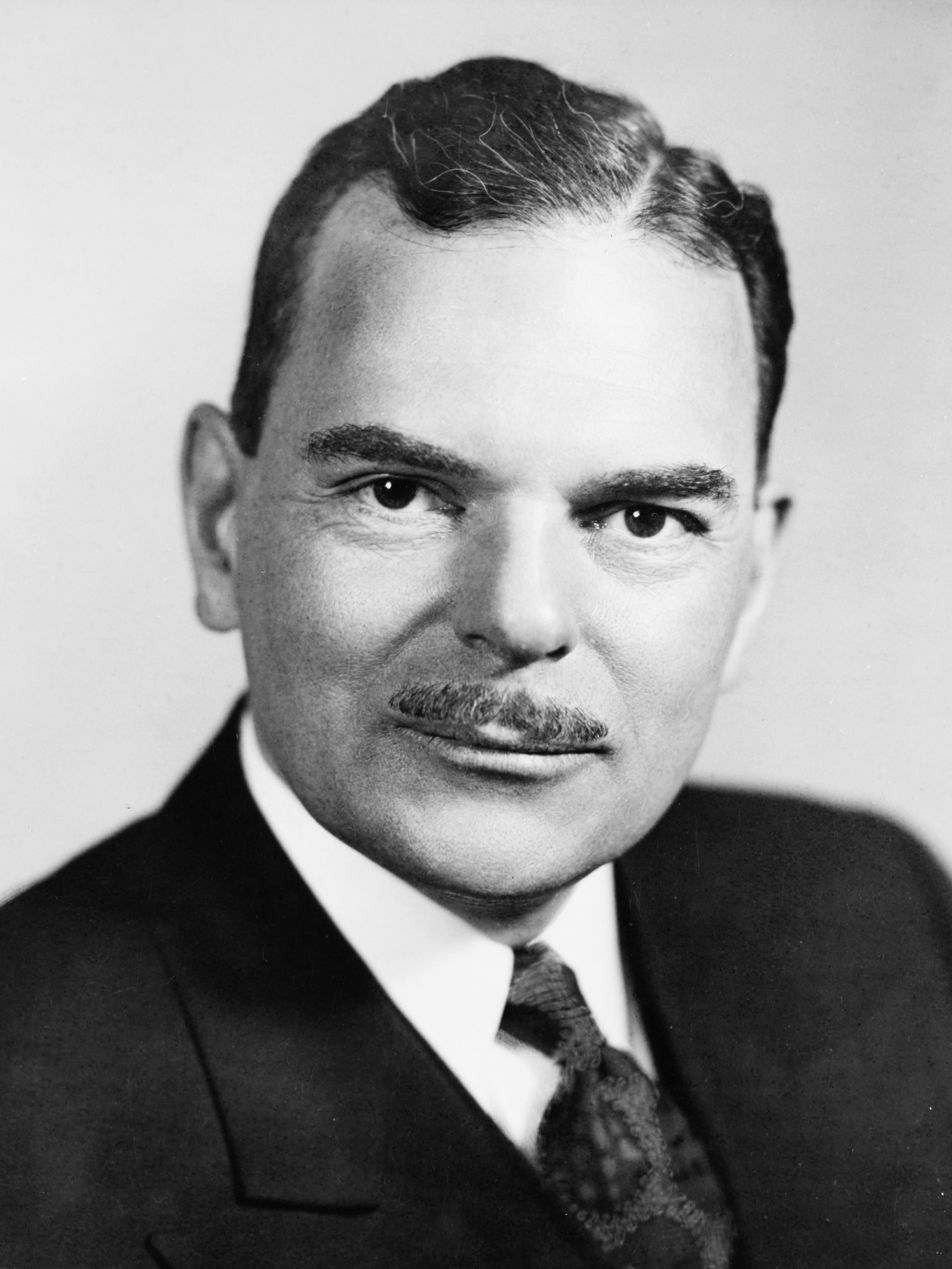

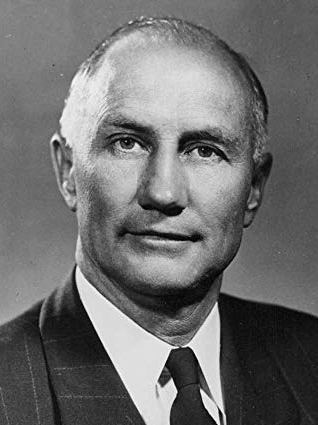
Nominee	Harry S. Truman	Thomas E. Dewey	Strom Thurmond
Party	Democratic	Republican	States’ Rights Democratic
Home state	Missouri	New York	South Carolina
Running mate	Alben W. Barkley	Earl Warren	Fielding L. Wright
Electoral vote	11	0	0
Popular vote	200,786	172,070	43,393
Percentage	47.89%	41.04%	10.35%
County and independent city results
Truman
30–40%
40–50%
50–60%
60–70%
70–80%
Dewey
30–40%
40–50%
50–60%
60–70%
70–80%
Thurmond
50–60%
President before election
Harry S. Truman
Democratic
Elected President
Harry S. Truman
Democratic

The 1948 United States presidential election in Virginia took place on November 2, 1948, throughout the 48 contiguous states. Voters chose 11 representatives, or electors, to the Electoral College, who voted for president and vice president.

For the previous four decades Virginia had almost completely disenfranchised its black and poor white populations through the use of a cumulative poll tax and literacy tests. So restricted was suffrage in this period that it has been calculated that a third of Virginia's electorate during the first half of the twentieth century comprised state employees and officeholders.

This limited electorate allowed Virginian politics to be controlled for four decades by the Byrd Organization, as progressive “antiorganization” factions were rendered impotent by the inability of almost all their potential electorate to vote. Historical fusion with the “Readjuster” Democrats, defection of substantial proportions of the Northeast-aligned white electorate of the Shenandoah Valley and Southwest Virginia over free silver, and an early move towards a “lily white” Jim Crow party meant Republicans retained a small but permanent number of legislative seats and local offices in the western part of the state. In 1928 a combination of growing middle-class Republicanism in the cities and anti-Catholicism against Al Smith in the Tidewater allowed the GOP to carry Virginia and elect three Congressmen, including one representing the local district of emerging machine leader Byrd. However, from 1932 with the state severely affected by the Depression, Republican strength declined below its low pre-1928 level, although Byrd himself became highly critical of Franklin D. Roosevelt’s New Deal policies as early as 1940.

Virginia’s delegates at the 1948 Democratic National Convention were all opposed to incumbent President Harry S. Truman after his proposal for black civil rights titled To Secure These Rights. Nevertheless, the presence of viable Republican opposition in the southwest and Shenandoah Valley meant that Byrd refused to endorse either South Carolina Governor Strom Thurmond, who received the nomination of the States’ Rights Democratic Party, or Republican nominee New York Governor Thomas E. Dewey, largely because of fear of losing several seats in the House to resurgent Republicans.

== Campaign ==
Despite the failure of local federal officeholders to endorse him, Thurmond campaigned extensively in Virginia during October, arguing that Truman, Dewey and Progressive candidate Henry A. Wallace all had platforms that would destroy the existing “American way of life”. The Item argued that Byrd did support Thurmond and that his tour was helping the South Carolina Governor, although other polls did not imply this. Neither Dewey nor Truman campaigned in Virginia, and despite the fact that all federal representatives supported the incumbent president, local party officials of the Byrd Organization did little to work for Truman and running mate Alben W. Barkley.

Despite all polls expecting Dewey to carry the state, Truman would win quite comfortably, although the Democratic margin fell by more than seventeen points vis-à-vis the 1944 election.

Thurmond won 11% of white voters.

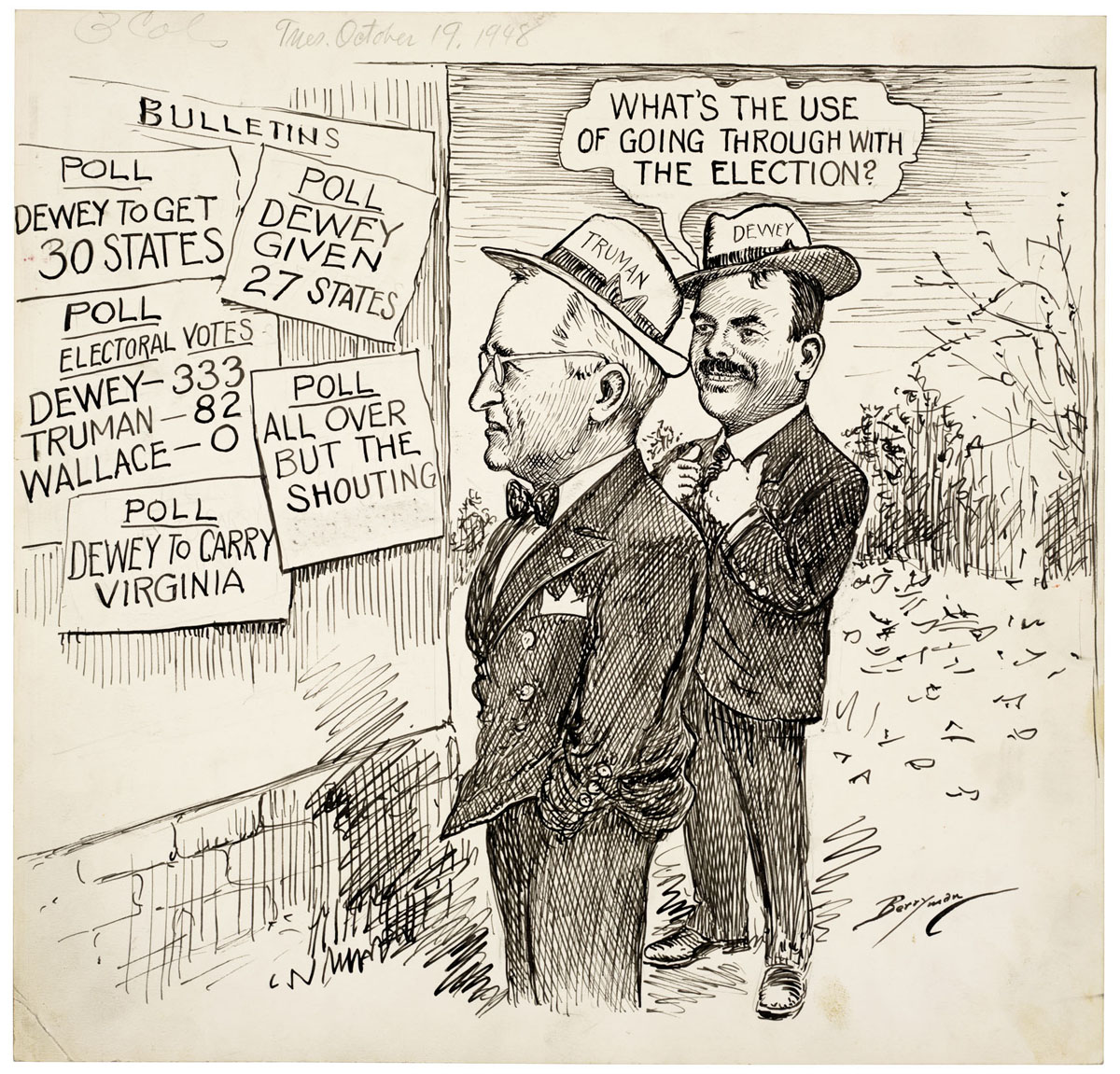
Clifford K. Berryman's editorial cartoon of October 19, 1948. One of the cards says that, according to a poll, Dewey would succeed in Virginia.

=== Polls ===
Source	Ranking	As of
Chattanooga Daily Times	Lean R (flip)	October 15, 1948
The Montgomery Advertiser	Likely R (flip)	October 24, 1948
The Miami News	Likely R (flip)	October 25, 1948
Mount Vernon Argus	Likely R (flip)	November 1, 1948
Oakland Tribune	Tilt R (flip)	November 1, 1948

== Results ==
1948 United States presidential election in Virginia
Party	Candidate	Votes	Percentage	Electoral votes
Democratic	Harry S. Truman (inc.)	200,786	47.89%	11
Republican	Thomas E. Dewey	172,070	41.04%	0
States’ Rights	Strom Thurmond	43,393	10.35%	0
Progressive	Henry A. Wallace	2,047	0.49%	0
Socialist	Norman Thomas	726	0.17%	0
Socialist Labor	Edward Teichert	234	0.06%	0
Totals		419,256	100.00%	11

=== Results by county or independent city ===
1948 United States presidential election in Virginia by counties and independent cities
County or city	Harry S. Truman Democratic		Thomas E. Dewey Republican		Strom Thurmond States’ Rights		Henry A. Wallace Progressive		Other candidates Various parties		Margin		Total votes cast
County or city	#	%	#	%	#	%	#	%	#	%	#	%	Total votes cast
Accomack County	1,669	53.77%	1,088	35.05%	339	10.92%	5	0.16%	3	0.10%	581	18.72%	3,104
Albemarle County	1,178	48.22%	984	40.28%	271	11.09%	4	0.16%	6	0.25%	194	7.94%	2,443
Alleghany County	2,253	58.52%	1,425	37.01%	147	3.82%	14	0.36%	11	0.29%	828	21.51%	3,850
Amelia County	443	41.87%	372	35.16%	237	22.40%	4	0.38%	2	0.19%	71	6.71%	1,058
Amherst County	1,481	60.06%	460	18.65%	507	20.56%	4	0.16%	14	0.57%	974 (Note: In this county or city where Thurmond ran second ahead of Dewey, the margin given is Truman vote minus Thurmond vote.)	39.50%	2,466
Appomattox County	1,182	70.95%	238	14.29%	241	14.47%	3	0.18%	2	0.12%	941	56.48%	1,666
Arlington County	7,798	38.77%	10,774	53.57%	1,121	5.57%	267	1.33%	151	0.75%	-2,976	-14.80%	20,111
Augusta County	1,355	39.23%	1,690	48.93%	401	11.61%	2	0.06%	6	0.17%	-335	-9.70%	3,454
Bath County	375	39.98%	488	52.03%	70	7.46%	5	0.53%	0	0.00%	-113	-12.05%	938
Bedford County	1,556	43.11%	1,084	30.04%	963	26.68%	2	0.06%	4	0.11%	472	13.08%	3,609
Bland County	738	45.33%	822	50.49%	66	4.05%	1	0.06%	1	0.06%	-84	-5.16%	1,628
Botetourt County	1,026	39.00%	1,363	51.81%	230	8.74%	10	0.38%	2	0.08%	-337	-12.81%	2,631
Brunswick County	1,067	48.46%	229	10.40%	895	40.64%	3	0.14%	8	0.36%	172	7.81%	2,202
Buchanan County	3,174	59.61%	2,085	39.15%	51	0.96%	7	0.13%	8	0.15%	1,089	20.45%	5,325
Buckingham County	728	57.46%	354	27.94%	185	14.60%	0	0.00%	0	0.00%	374	29.52%	1,267
Campbell County	1,554	54.03%	668	23.23%	644	22.39%	3	0.10%	7	0.24%	886	30.81%	2,876
Caroline County	731	55.72%	397	30.26%	182	13.87%	2	0.15%	0	0.00%	334	25.46%	1,312
Carroll County	1,196	32.00%	2,456	65.72%	76	2.03%	5	0.13%	4	0.11%	-1,260	-33.72%	3,737
Charles City County	258	51.91%	167	33.60%	69	13.88%	2	0.40%	1	0.20%	91	18.31%	497
Charlotte County	964	57.83%	285	17.10%	417	25.01%	0	0.00%	1	0.06%	547	32.81%	1,667
Chesterfield County	2,600	54.97%	1,428	30.19%	671	14.19%	18	0.38%	13	0.27%	1,172	24.78%	4,730
Clarke County	482	41.62%	384	33.16%	284	24.53%	3	0.26%	5	0.43%	98	8.46%	1,158
Craig County	456	57.29%	317	39.82%	23	2.89%	0	0.00%	0	0.00%	139	17.46%	796
Culpeper County	804	47.32%	682	40.14%	211	12.42%	2	0.12%	0	0.00%	122	7.18%	1,699
Cumberland County	424	52.15%	219	26.94%	169	20.79%	0	0.00%	1	0.12%	205	25.22%	813
Dickenson County	2,945	56.94%	2,197	42.48%	16	0.31%	12	0.23%	2	0.04%	748	14.46%	5,172
Dinwiddie County	961	64.07%	261	17.40%	268	17.87%	7	0.47%	3	0.20%	693	46.20%	1,500
Elizabeth City County	2,744	57.31%	1,617	33.77%	364	7.60%	47	0.98%	16	0.33%	1,127	23.54%	4,788
Essex County	329	50.54%	221	33.95%	99	15.21%	1	0.15%	1	0.15%	108	16.59%	651
Fairfax County	3,719	39.19%	4,930	51.95%	705	7.43%	79	0.83%	56	0.59%	-1,211	-12.76%	9,489
Fauquier County	1,291	48.41%	1,102	41.32%	265	9.94%	3	0.11%	6	0.22%	189	7.09%	2,667
Floyd County	434	24.87%	1,266	72.55%	42	2.41%	1	0.06%	2	0.11%	-832	-47.68%	1,745
Fluvanna County	447	52.46%	319	37.44%	83	9.74%	2	0.23%	1	0.12%	128	15.02%	852
Franklin County	1,343	47.74%	1,100	39.10%	348	12.37%	13	0.46%	9	0.32%	243	8.64%	2,813
Frederick County	1,244	51.75%	921	38.31%	239	9.94%	0	0.00%	0	0.00%	323	13.44%	2,404
Giles County	1,529	49.09%	1,448	46.48%	131	4.21%	4	0.13%	3	0.10%	81	2.60%	3,115
Gloucester County	719	56.44%	434	34.07%	117	9.18%	3	0.24%	1	0.08%	285	22.37%	1,274
Goochland County	683	59.91%	292	25.61%	154	13.51%	8	0.70%	3	0.26%	391	34.30%	1,140
Grayson County	2,741	41.73%	3,669	55.86%	152	2.31%	3	0.05%	3	0.05%	-928	-14.13%	6,568
Greene County	261	36.55%	420	58.82%	28	3.92%	3	0.42%	2	0.28%	-159	-22.27%	714
Greensville County	710	49.75%	301	21.09%	404	28.31%	4	0.28%	8	0.56%	306	21.44%	1,427
Halifax County	1,323	34.19%	521	13.46%	2,007	51.86%	7	0.18%	12	0.31%	-684	-17.67%	3,870
Hanover County	1,048	47.59%	838	38.06%	294	13.35%	14	0.64%	8	0.36%	210	9.54%	2,202
Henrico County	2,321	46.70%	2,092	42.09%	508	10.22%	36	0.72%	13	0.26%	229	4.61%	4,970
Henry County	1,318	51.95%	730	28.77%	474	18.68%	7	0.28%	8	0.32%	588	23.18%	2,537
Highland County	423	38.81%	579	53.12%	85	7.80%	1	0.09%	2	0.18%	-156	-14.31%	1,090
Isle of Wight County	1,064	66.88%	442	27.78%	81	5.09%	2	0.13%	2	0.13%	622	39.09%	1,591
James City County	198	44.49%	177	39.78%	68	15.28%	1	0.22%	1	0.22%	21	4.72%	445
King and Queen County	293	53.56%	171	31.26%	82	14.99%	0	0.00%	1	0.18%	122	22.30%	547
King George County	248	34.44%	316	43.89%	152	21.11%	2	0.28%	2	0.28%	-68	-9.44%	720
King William County	476	49.02%	348	35.84%	138	14.21%	5	0.51%	4	0.41%	128	13.18%	971
Lancaster County	560	47.70%	459	39.10%	149	12.69%	4	0.34%	2	0.17%	101	8.60%	1,174
Lee County	4,069	48.06%	4,297	50.76%	86	1.02%	7	0.08%	7	0.08%	-228	-2.69%	8,466
Loudoun County	1,545	47.61%	1,430	44.07%	246	7.58%	10	0.31%	14	0.43%	115	3.54%	3,245
Louisa County	782	46.24%	701	41.45%	201	11.89%	6	0.35%	1	0.06%	81	4.79%	1,691
Lunenburg County	1,126	65.54%	251	14.61%	335	19.50%	3	0.17%	3	0.17%	791	46.04%	1,718
Madison County	428	36.03%	662	55.72%	89	7.49%	2	0.17%	7	0.59%	-234	-19.70%	1,188
Mathews County	458	44.42%	490	47.53%	81	7.86%	2	0.19%	0	0.00%	-32	-3.10%	1,031
Mecklenburg County	2,117	69.34%	513	16.80%	422	13.82%	1	0.03%	0	0.00%	1,604	52.54%	3,053
Middlesex County	457	51.99%	271	30.83%	148	16.84%	1	0.11%	2	0.23%	186	21.16%	879
Montgomery County	1,126	32.42%	2,070	59.60%	254	7.31%	5	0.14%	18	0.52%	-944	-27.18%	3,473
Nansemond County	2,115	76.27%	413	14.89%	179	6.46%	66	2.38%	0	0.00%	1,702	61.38%	2,773
Nelson County	1,204	69.16%	371	21.31%	164	9.42%	1	0.06%	1	0.06%	833	47.85%	1,741
New Kent County	277	53.89%	140	27.24%	92	17.90%	1	0.19%	4	0.78%	137	26.65%	514
Norfolk County	4,696	66.24%	1,830	25.81%	536	7.56%	21	0.30%	6	0.08%	2,866	40.43%	7,089
Northampton County	997	56.71%	525	29.86%	229	13.03%	5	0.28%	2	0.11%	472	26.85%	1,758
Northumberland County	429	37.43%	535	46.68%	178	15.53%	2	0.17%	2	0.17%	-106	-9.25%	1,146
Nottoway County	1,004	51.15%	486	24.76%	467	23.79%	2	0.10%	4	0.20%	518	26.39%	1,963
Orange County	856	46.22%	726	39.20%	264	14.25%	3	0.16%	3	0.16%	130	7.02%	1,852
Page County	1,611	39.73%	2,236	55.14%	172	4.24%	33	0.81%	3	0.07%	-625	-15.41%	4,055
Patrick County	760	41.30%	648	35.22%	430	23.37%	1	0.05%	1	0.05%	112	6.09%	1,840
Pittsylvania County	3,149	55.58%	1,164	20.54%	1,321	23.31%	11	0.19%	21	0.37%	1,828	32.26%	5,666
Powhatan County	338	50.98%	238	35.90%	83	12.52%	2	0.30%	2	0.30%	100	15.08%	663
Prince Edward County	740	43.07%	459	26.72%	510	29.69%	2	0.12%	7	0.41%	230	13.39%	1,718
Prince George County	745	61.57%	317	26.20%	138	11.40%	7	0.58%	3	0.25%	428	35.37%	1,210
Princess Anne County	2,008	54.05%	1,329	35.77%	361	9.72%	12	0.32%	5	0.13%	679	18.28%	3,715
Prince William County	1,162	55.78%	760	36.49%	151	7.25%	6	0.29%	4	0.19%	402	19.30%	2,083
Pulaski County	1,412	40.90%	1,691	48.99%	344	9.97%	3	0.09%	2	0.06%	-279	-8.08%	3,452
Rappahannock County	617	59.67%	311	30.08%	100	9.67%	3	0.29%	3	0.29%	306	29.59%	1,034
Richmond County	240	39.02%	296	48.13%	70	11.38%	3	0.49%	6	0.98%	-56	-9.11%	615
Roanoke County	2,876	38.58%	3,988	53.49%	568	7.62%	18	0.24%	5	0.07%	-1,112	-14.92%	7,455
Rockbridge County	994	43.52%	1,062	46.50%	217	9.50%	5	0.22%	6	0.26%	-68	-2.98%	2,284
Rockingham County	1,680	32.42%	3,219	62.12%	260	5.02%	8	0.15%	15	0.29%	-1,539	-29.70%	5,182
Russell County	2,689	51.29%	2,447	46.67%	103	1.96%	2	0.04%	2	0.04%	242	4.62%	5,243
Scott County	2,676	42.67%	3,520	56.12%	63	1.00%	6	0.10%	7	0.11%	-844	-13.46%	6,272
Shenandoah County	1,603	30.95%	3,349	64.65%	214	4.13%	8	0.15%	6	0.12%	-1,746	-33.71%	5,180
Smyth County	1,750	36.29%	2,897	60.08%	161	3.34%	4	0.08%	10	0.21%	-1,147	-23.79%	4,822
Southampton County	1,462	69.62%	339	16.14%	291	13.86%	5	0.24%	3	0.14%	1,123	53.48%	2,100
Spotsylvania County	818	54.17%	517	34.24%	170	11.26%	4	0.26%	1	0.07%	301	19.93%	1,510
Stafford County	708	44.84%	732	46.36%	129	8.17%	6	0.38%	4	0.25%	-24	-1.52%	1,579
Surry County	460	59.43%	134	17.31%	180	23.26%	0	0.00%	0	0.00%	280	36.18%	774
Sussex County	614	50.33%	244	20.00%	355	29.10%	3	0.25%	4	0.33%	259	21.23%	1,220
Tazewell County	2,258	47.98%	2,278	48.41%	163	3.46%	6	0.13%	1	0.02%	-20	-0.42%	4,706
Warren County	1,291	51.99%	1,016	40.92%	166	6.69%	6	0.24%	4	0.16%	275	11.08%	2,483
Washington County	2,510	44.09%	2,972	52.20%	187	3.28%	11	0.19%	13	0.23%	-462	-8.12%	5,693
Westmoreland County	503	39.42%	568	44.51%	197	15.44%	7	0.55%	1	0.08%	-65	-5.09%	1,276
Wise County	4,862	61.98%	2,836	36.15%	133	1.70%	8	0.10%	6	0.08%	2,026	25.83%	7,845
Wythe County	976	29.26%	2,077	62.26%	279	8.36%	3	0.09%	1	0.03%	-1,101	-33.00%	3,336
York County	826	60.03%	418	30.38%	119	8.65%	6	0.44%	7	0.51%	408	29.65%	1,376
Alexandria City	3,917	44.99%	3,903	44.83%	777	8.92%	67	0.77%	43	0.49%	14	0.16%	8,707
Bristol City	1,451	58.94%	879	35.70%	125	5.08%	7	0.28%	0	0.00%	572	23.23%	2,462
Buena Vista City	297	52.75%	234	41.56%	31	5.51%	1	0.18%	0	0.00%	63	11.19%	563
Charlottesville City	1,527	45.35%	1,419	42.14%	387	11.49%	15	0.45%	19	0.56%	108	3.21%	3,367
Clifton Forge City	818	58.22%	451	32.10%	131	9.32%	4	0.28%	1	0.07%	367	26.12%	1,405
Danville City	2,334	42.84%	1,579	28.98%	1,511	27.73%	11	0.20%	13	0.24%	755	13.86%	5,448
Fredericksburg City	816	42.26%	810	41.95%	290	15.02%	9	0.47%	6	0.31%	6	0.31%	1,931
Hampton City	727	58.87%	371	30.04%	123	9.96%	13	1.05%	1	0.08%	356	28.83%	1,235
Harrisonburg City	751	31.93%	1,377	58.55%	208	8.84%	8	0.34%	8	0.34%	-626	-26.62%	2,352
Hopewell City	1,242	62.70%	570	28.77%	150	7.57%	16	0.81%	3	0.15%	672	33.92%	1,981
Lynchburg City	2,480	36.76%	2,373	35.17%	1,841	27.29%	23	0.34%	30	0.44%	107	1.59%	6,747
Martinsville City	814	39.50%	642	31.15%	598	29.02%	6	0.29%	1	0.05%	172	8.35%	2,061
Newport News City	3,420	65.28%	1,453	27.73%	284	5.42%	71	1.36%	11	0.21%	1,967	37.55%	5,239
Norfolk City	9,370	50.76%	7,556	40.93%	1,255	6.80%	259	1.40%	20	0.11%	1,814	9.83%	18,460
Petersburg City	2,019	52.70%	1,189	31.04%	599	15.64%	16	0.42%	8	0.21%	830	21.67%	3,831
Portsmouth City	4,612	62.48%	2,056	27.86%	615	8.33%	82	1.11%	16	0.22%	2,556	34.63%	7,381
Radford City	826	46.80%	850	48.16%	80	4.53%	6	0.34%	3	0.17%	-24	-1.36%	1,765
Richmond City	16,466	46.64%	14,549	41.21%	3,892	11.03%	307	0.87%	87	0.25%	1,917	5.43%	35,301
Roanoke City	5,343	40.48%	6,542	49.56%	1,244	9.42%	60	0.45%	11	0.08%	-1,199	-9.08%	13,200
South Norfolk City	857	66.80%	347	27.05%	73	5.69%	6	0.47%	0	0.00%	510	39.75%	1,283
Staunton City	914	34.19%	1,323	49.49%	418	15.64%	9	0.34%	9	0.34%	-409	-15.30%	2,673
Suffolk City	1,030	49.76%	741	35.80%	246	11.88%	51	2.46%	2	0.10%	289	13.96%	2,070
Warwick City	1,822	57.57%	1,014	32.04%	306	9.67%	13	0.41%	10	0.32%	808	25.53%	3,165
Waynesboro City	839	46.77%	833	46.43%	118	6.58%	0	0.00%	4	0.22%	6	0.33%	1,794
Williamsburg City	312	36.75%	334	39.34%	191	22.50%	8	0.94%	4	0.47%	-22	-2.59%	849
Winchester City	894	35.11%	1,272	49.96%	371	14.57%	7	0.27%	2	0.08%	-378	-14.85%	2,546
Totals	200,786	47.89%	172,070	41.04%	43,393	10.35%	2,047	0.49%	960	0.23%	28,716	6.85%	419,256

==== Counties and independent cities that flipped from Democratic to Republican ====
- Augusta
- Bath
- Bland
- Botetourt
- King George
- Lee
- Mathews
- Northumberland
- Pulaski
- Radford City
- Richmond
- Roanoke
- Roanoke City
- Rockbridge
- Staunton City
- Tazewell
- Washington
- Westmoreland
- Williamsburg City

==== Counties that flipped from Democratic to Dixiecrat ====
- Halifax

== Analysis ==
Ultimately, Virginia was won by Truman with 47.89 percent of the vote to Dewey's 41.04 percent and Thurmond's 10.35 percent. This contradicted polls that expected Dewey to carry the state with around 47 percent of the vote to Truman's 45 percent and 7 to 8 percent for Thurmond. This election nonetheless accelerated the major losses Franklin D. Roosevelt experienced in the Washington D.C. suburbs and the Shenandoah Valley at the previous election — losses which would pave the way for Virginia voting Republican in thirteen of the next fourteen presidential elections.

As of the 2024 presidential election, this is the last election in which the Fifth Congressional District has supported a Democratic presidential candidate. It is also the last election when Hanover County, King William County, Lancaster County, Middlesex County and Orange County have supported a Democratic presidential nominee. Chesterfield County and Lynchburg City would not vote Democratic again at a presidential level until 2020, Henrico County not until 2008, Albemarle County and Danville City not until 2004, Prince Edward County not until 1996 and Amelia County not until 1976.

This remains the last occasion Virginia voted to the left of Delaware, and was also the last time until 2012 that Virginia voted for a different candidate than Indiana. Truman's 6.85% margin of victory meant that Virginia voted 2.37% more Democratic than the country at large, marking the last time Virginia voted to the left of the nation until 2012.

== See also ==
- United States presidential elections in Virginia

== Works cited ==
- Black, Earl; Black, Merle (1992). The Vital South: How Presidents Are Elected. Harvard University Press. ISBN 0674941306.
