= Robert B. Smith (Virginia mayor) =

American politician

Mayor of Newport News
- In office 1956–1958
- Preceded by: Alfred M. Monfalcone
- Succeeded by: Oscar J. Brittingham Jr.

Robert B. "Bob" Smith was the mayor of Newport News, Virginia from September 1, 1956 to June 30, 1958. Prior to serving as mayor, Smith had served as the head of the news operation for the city's Daily Press and Times-Herald newspapers. In 1946, he served as an officer for the city's Golden Anniversary celebration, commemorating 50 years since the city's incorporation.

Preceded by Alfred M. Monfalcone	Mayor of Newport News; 1956–1958	Succeeded by Oscar J. Brittingham Jr.
