= R. Cowles Taylor =

American politician

Mayor of Newport News, Virginia
- In office 1942–1952

Personal details
- Born: August 12, 1893
- Died: December 20, 1955 (aged 62)

Robert Cowles Taylor (August 12, 1893 – December 20, 1955) was an American politician and dentist who served as the mayor of Newport News, Virginia, from 1942 to 1955.

== Biography ==
Taylor was born in 1893, the son of Warren J. Taylor and Mary Isabel “Mamie” Eubank Taylor. Taylor worked for several years in the field of dentistry. In 1940, Taylor was elected to the Newport News City Council.

=== Mayor (1941-1955) ===
Taylor served as mayor of the city during World War II, at a time when the city's ports were used to send American troops to Europe to fight in the war. As was seen during World War I, this activity put a tremendous strain on the city's infrastructure, and Taylor was instrumental in seeing that the city continued to function despite the effort. At one point, several tens of thousands of homes, rooms and hotels would come under rent control imposed by Taylor. Taylor also served on the committee that planned the city's Golden Anniversary year in 1946 to celebrate the fiftieth anniversary of Newport News's incorporation as a city.

=== Personal life and death ===
Taylor was married to Ellen Longan Taylor, and they had three children. He was a member of the Rotary Club and a Mason. Taylor died in office in 1955 at the age of 62, after an illness of several months.

Preceded by T. Parker Host Sr.	Mayor of Newport News; 1942–1955	Succeeded by Alfred M. Monfalcone
