= Ceelys on the James =

Plantation in Virginia, United States

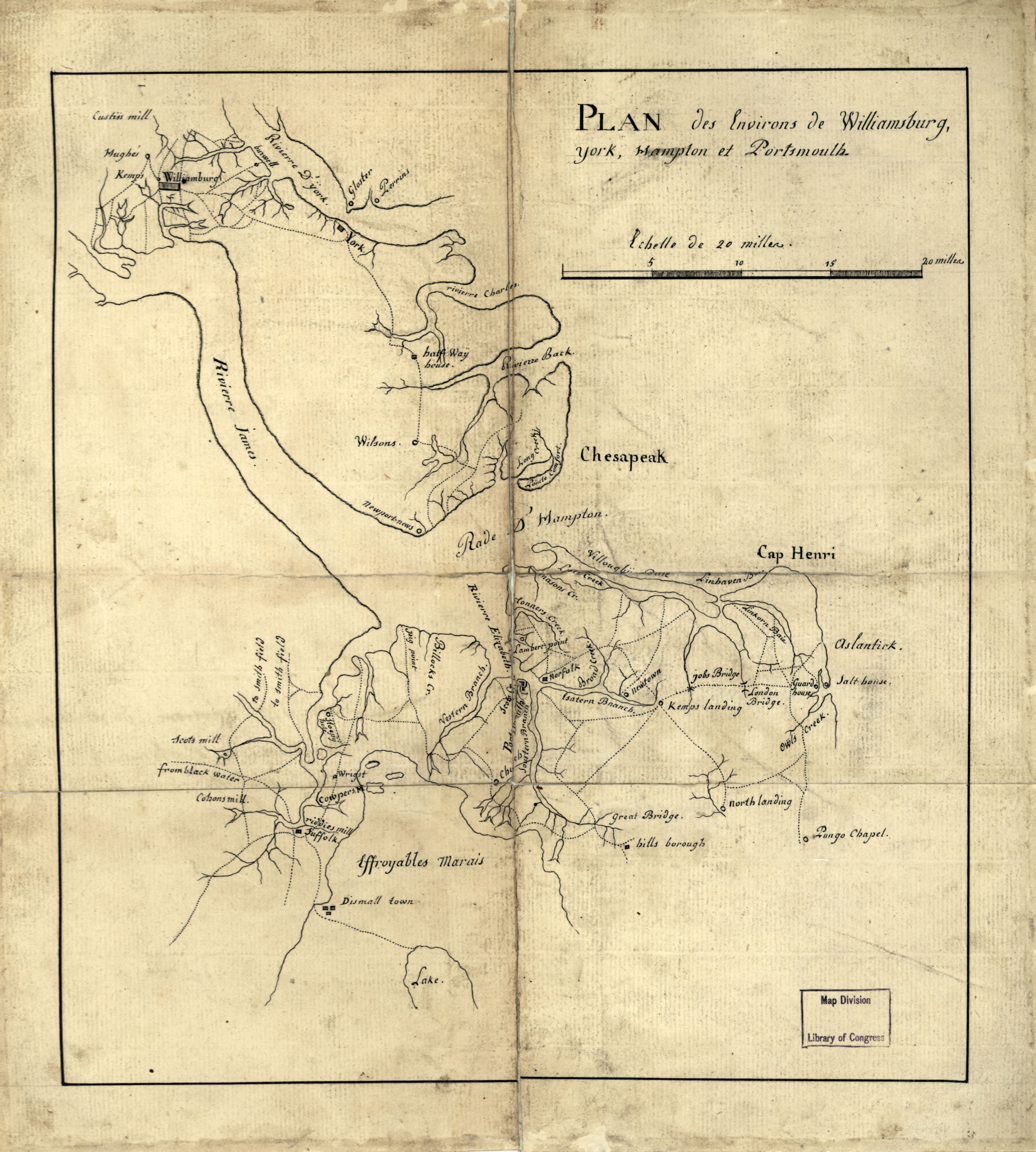
Wilson's plantation (Ceelys)

Ceelys on the James was a plantation on the James River in Virginia, built in 1706 by Colonel William Wilson.

Wilson's daughter, Mary, married Colonel Miles Cary, Jr. of Richneck Plantation. Sally Cary, who married George William Fairfax, and Sarah Cary, who married Bryan Fairfax were born there.

Located 3 or 4 miles from Hampton, it was destroyed during the Civil War.

== See also ==
- Historic houses in Virginia
- James River Plantations
- Newport News, Virginia
- List of former United States counties
