= Shires of Virginia =

Local government units of Virginia, 1634–1642

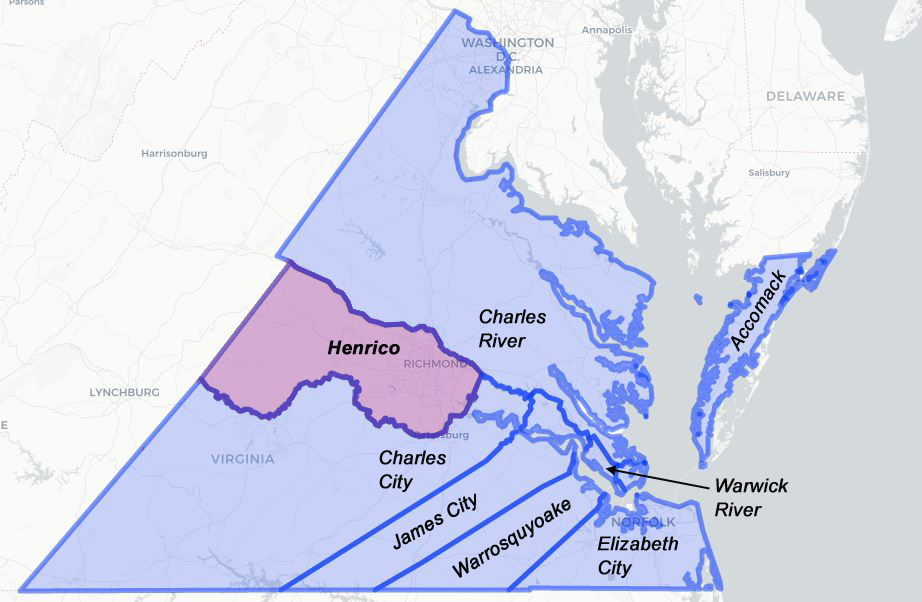
Map of the eight Shires of Virginia Colony

The eight Shires of Virginia were formed in 1634 in the Virginia Colony. These shires were based on a form of local government used in England at the time, and were redesignated as counties a few years later. As of 2007, five of the eight original shires were considered still extant in the Commonwealth of Virginia in essentially their same political form, although some boundaries and several names have changed in the almost 400 years since their creation.

== History ==
In 1634, a new system of local government was created in the Virginia Colony by order of King Charles I of England. Eight shires were named by the House of Burgesses, each with its own local officers. The term shire in this system was officially changed to county only a few years later. There were also several early individual name changes, notably Warrosquyoake, a Native American name with varied spellings that became Isle of Wight. Also, during the English Civil War, Charles River County and the Charles River were changed to York County and York River respectively (though Charles City County kept its royal name).

The original Shires of Virginia were:

- Accomac Shire (later Northampton & Accomack Counties)
- Charles City Shire (later Charles City County)
- Charles River Shire (later York County)
- Elizabeth City Shire (extinct – consolidated with the City of Hampton)
- Henrico Shire (now Henrico County)
- James City Shire (later James City County)
- Warwick River Shire (extinct – consolidated with the City of Newport News)
- Warrosquyoake Shire (later Isle of Wight County)

Four of the shire names included names of cities that had been created in 1619. Between 1637 and 1642, their names formalized from "Shire" to "County", and the results apparently caused confusion two centuries later. This is due to names, such as "James City County" and "Charles City County" that seem contradictory to some in Virginia because after independent cities were introduced by the 1870 Constitution of Virginia, an area can be in a city or in a county, but cannot be in both.

- The county that included the original 1607 settlement at Jamestown apparently attempted to address any potential confusion long ago, when its legal name was the "County of James City" for a time. It is now officially James City County again.
- In 1952, the citizens of "Elizabeth City County" voted to relinquish county status, and consolidate with the independent city of Hampton. They also voted to assume the better-known and shorter name of Hampton.
- Also in 1952, Warwick County converted to an independent city. On July 1, 1958, the still nascent city of Warwick was politically re-consolidated with the independent city of Newport News to the south and east, which had itself broken away from Warwick County earlier in 1896.

== See also ==
- Former counties, cities, and towns of Virginia
