= Mulberry Island =

Island in Virginia

Coordinates: 37°06′55″N 76°35′25″W

Mulberry Island a roughly (11 sq mile) geographic area located in the city of Newport News, Virginia, in southeastern Virginia. While referred to as an island, it is actually a peninsula bordered on three sides by the James River, Warwick River, and Skiffe's Creek, and connected with the rest of the Virginia Peninsula by an approximately 1.5 mile wide strip of land.

== History ==
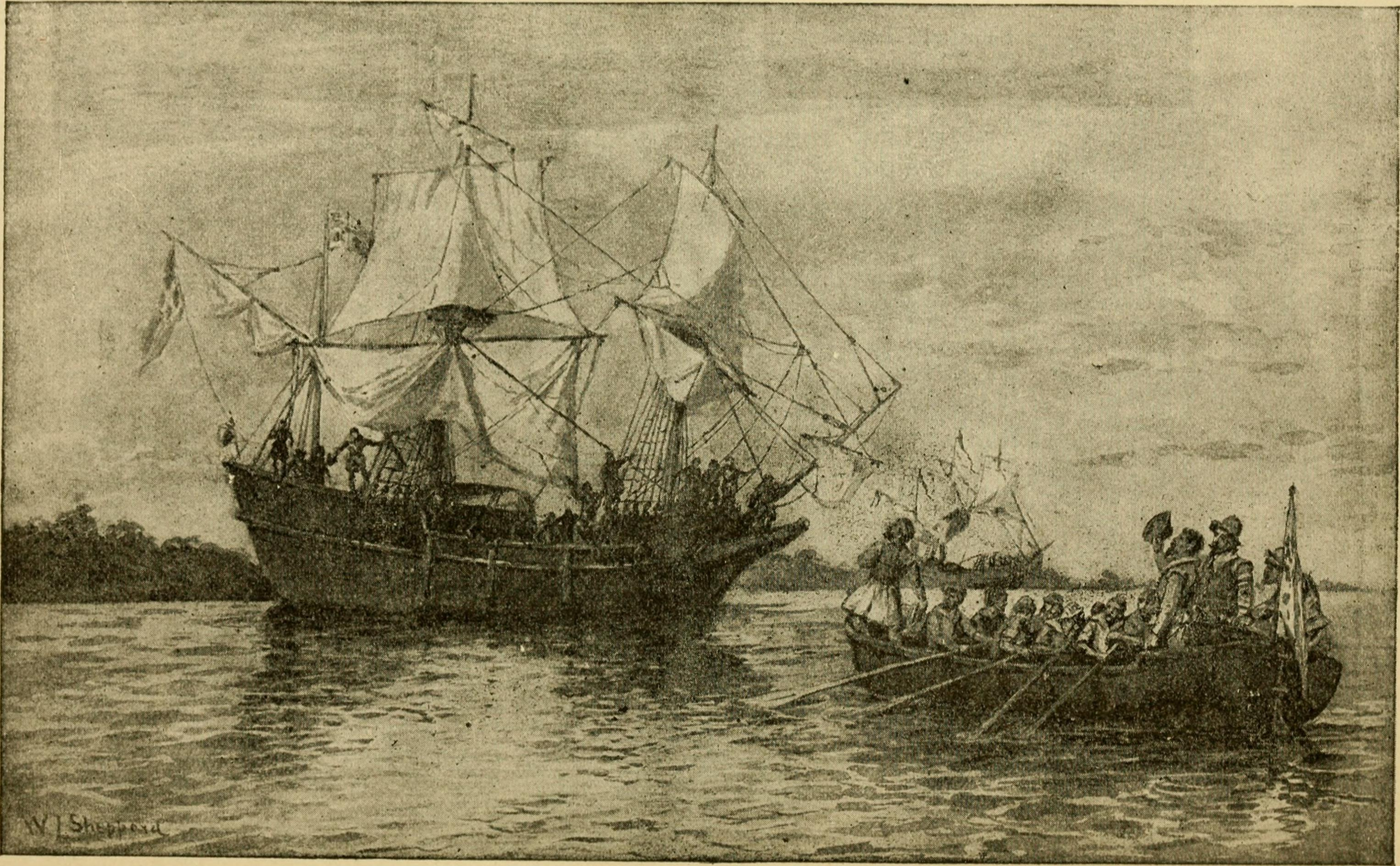
Lord De La Warr's flotilla intercepts the English refugees abandoning the Jamestown colony, June 1610

Mulberry Island was home to Native Americans for thousands of years before the English occupied it in the 1600s. When Jamestown Island was established in 1607, many parts of the James River were mapped and patented. It was at Mulberry Island where the Jamestown colonists (fleeing Starving Time) were met by a June 1610, supply mission of Thomas West, 3rd Baron De La Warr, which saved the English settlers.

By 1614, thousands of acres were under cultivation with tobacco, the export crop introduced by John Rolfe which saved the Virginia Colony financially. The first patent for land on Mulberry Island occurred in 1619. At that time, Mulberry Island included the site of the plantation held by William Pierce, Rolfe's father-in-law. Sir George Yeardley also held a 1,000 acre parcel on the south end of Mulberry Island (which would later be known as Stanley Hundred) as early as 1621, based on land patents. The early growth of the Mulberry Island settlement ended with the 1622 Indian uprising. The Virginia Company records state: "The numbers that were slaine in those severall Plantations” included six persons at Mulberry Island: Master Thomas Peirce, his wife, his child, John Hopkins, John Samon, and a “French boy". The remaining men, women, and children who survived the attack abandoned Mulberry Island at that time. By 1625, settlers returned to Mulberry Island armed with 42 swords, 27 guns, and 22 pieces of armor. The 1624/5 Muster noted 30 people among 13 households. By the end of the century, Edward Digges owned a plantation on the island, and attempted to cultivate silkworms on the native mulberry trees.

During the American Civil War, Mulberry Island's Fort Crafford was the southern end of the Warwick Line, a series of defensive works built across the Virginia Peninsula to Yorktown manned by troops of Confederate General John B. Magruder during the Peninsula Campaign of 1862.

From 1898 to 1918, Mulberry Island was home to Davis & Kimpton Brickyard. The brickyard sat on the west bank of the Warwick River.

Prior to its acquisition by the U.S. government for $538,000, Mulberry Island was primarily farmland. During the first World War, Camp Abraham Eustis was established on the historic island and adjacent land in Warwick County, upstream from Newport News Shipbuilding and Drydock Company. Named for Abraham Eustis, a U.S. Army General from Petersburg, the camp had a balloon observation school and an artillery school that remained in operation through the end of World War II. Camp Eustis became Fort Eustis and a permanent Army base in 1923. In 2010, it was combined with nearby Langley Air Force Base to form Joint Base Langley–Eustis.

== Modern times ==
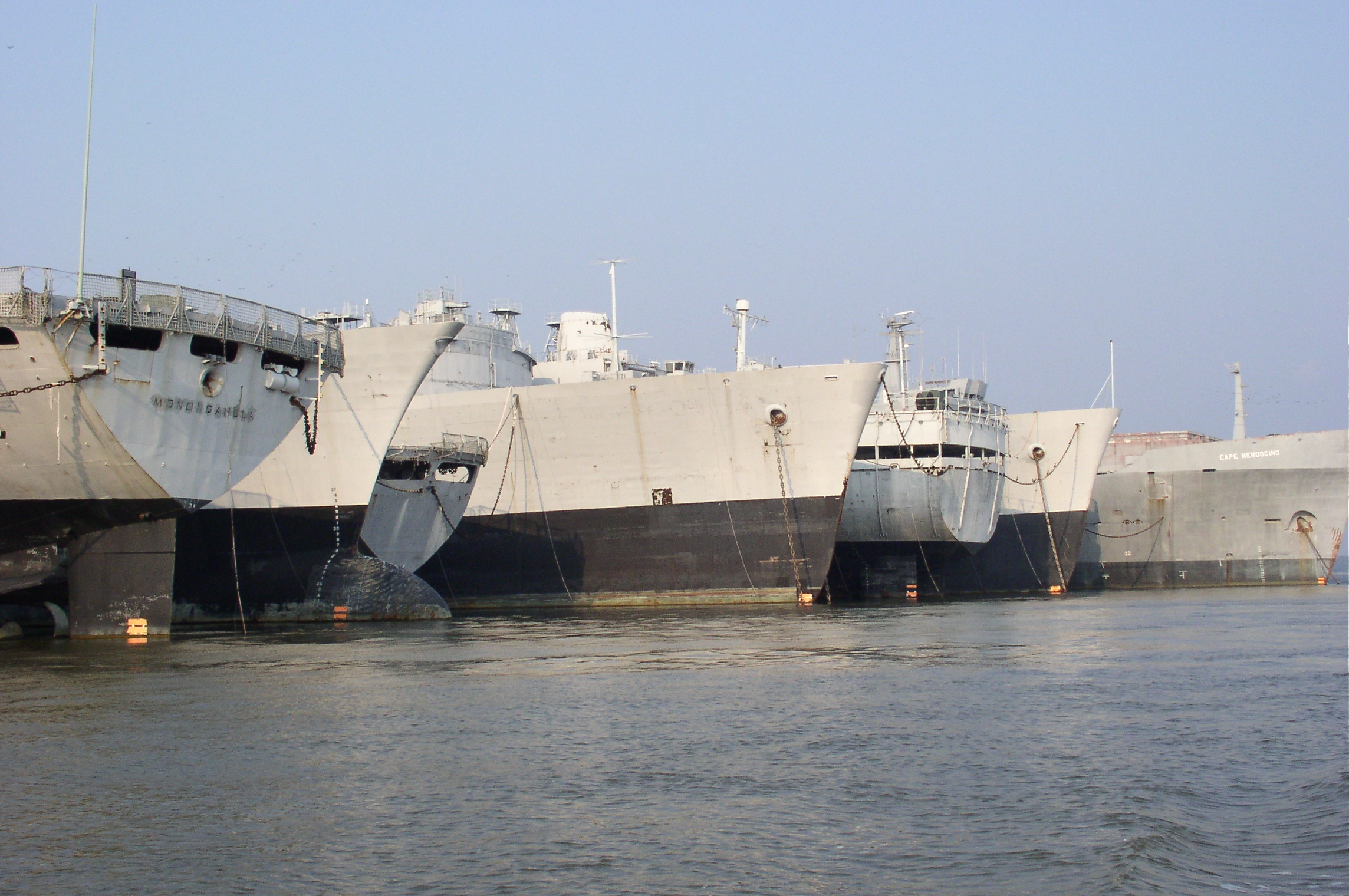
One of several rows of ships in the Ghost Fleet

Fort Eustis is currently home to the United States Army Training and Doctrine Command (TRADOC). Since 1958, following a political consolidation of the former Warwick County with the independent city of Newport News, almost all of the base and all of Mulberry Island are located within the corporate limits of Newport News. An army aviation school is also located at Fort Eustis.

An array of ships part of the National Defense Reserve Fleet are anchored adjacent to Mulberry Island in the middle of the James River. An environmental hazard, the reserve fleet is being reduced each year as ships are transported away as scrap. These ships are termed the "Idle Fleet" in local parlance.

== See also ==
- Stanley Hundred
- Skiffe's Creek
- Queen Hith Plantation Complex Site
- Fort Crafford
- Fort Eustis
- Matthew Jones House
- Joint Base Langley-Eustis
- Thomas Harwood
- Edward Digges
- George Yeardley
- Warwick County, Virginia
