= Blunt Poynt =

Historic site in Virginia, US

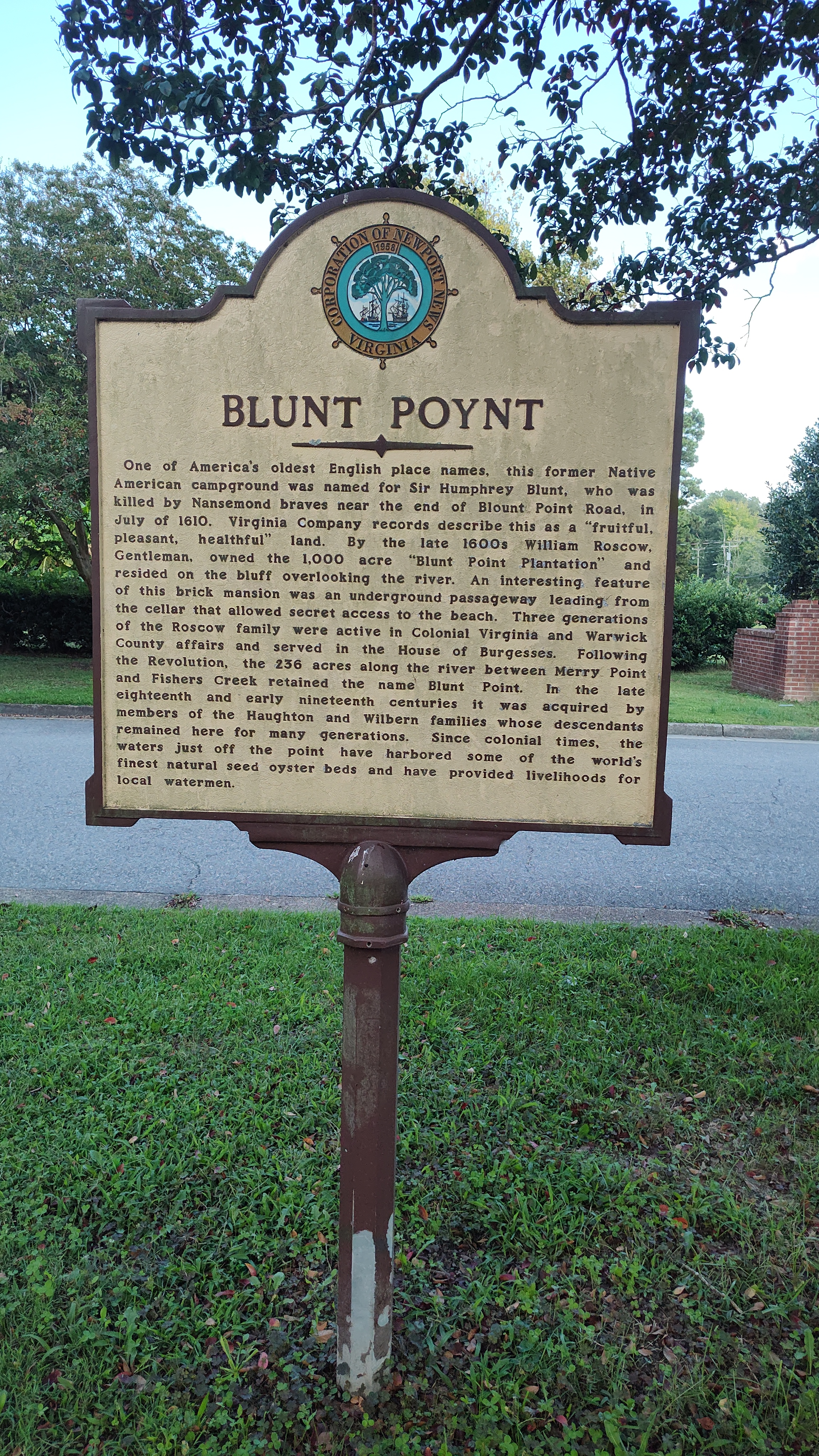
- Historical Marker for Blunt Poynt, October 2024.
- Interactive map of Blunt Poynt
- Type: Historical Location
- Location: Hidenwood, Newport News
- Coordinates: 37°3′50.5″N 76°31′9.9″W
- Area: 236 acres (96 ha)

Blunt Poynt (also spelled 'Blount Point' or 'Blunt Point') is a historic site located on the north shore of the James River near or in the modern-day Hidenwood neighborhood of Newport News, Virginia. It is named for an incident on July 1610. Sir Thomas Gates was going down the river, and observed an adrift longboat from Fort Algernon near Old Point Comfort. Gates sent Humphrey Blunt to retrieve the boat, but Blunt was ambushed and killed by Nansemond Indians while Gates observed. In retaliation, just a few days later, Gates would seize the native village of Kecoughtan, Virginia. These events were early conflicts leading up to the Anglo-Powhatan Wars

Because of the early date of this incident, it exists as one of the earliest English place-names in America. The name Blunt Poynt was used as a landmark of reference in some of the earliest land grants and reports of the Colony of Virginia.

The son of Virginia commonwealth governor Samuel Mathews, John Mathews, is recorded patenting 2944 acres in this area on 9 March 1678, and establishing a plantation in this area.

A marker for the site was erected by the city of Newport News on April 17, 2019.

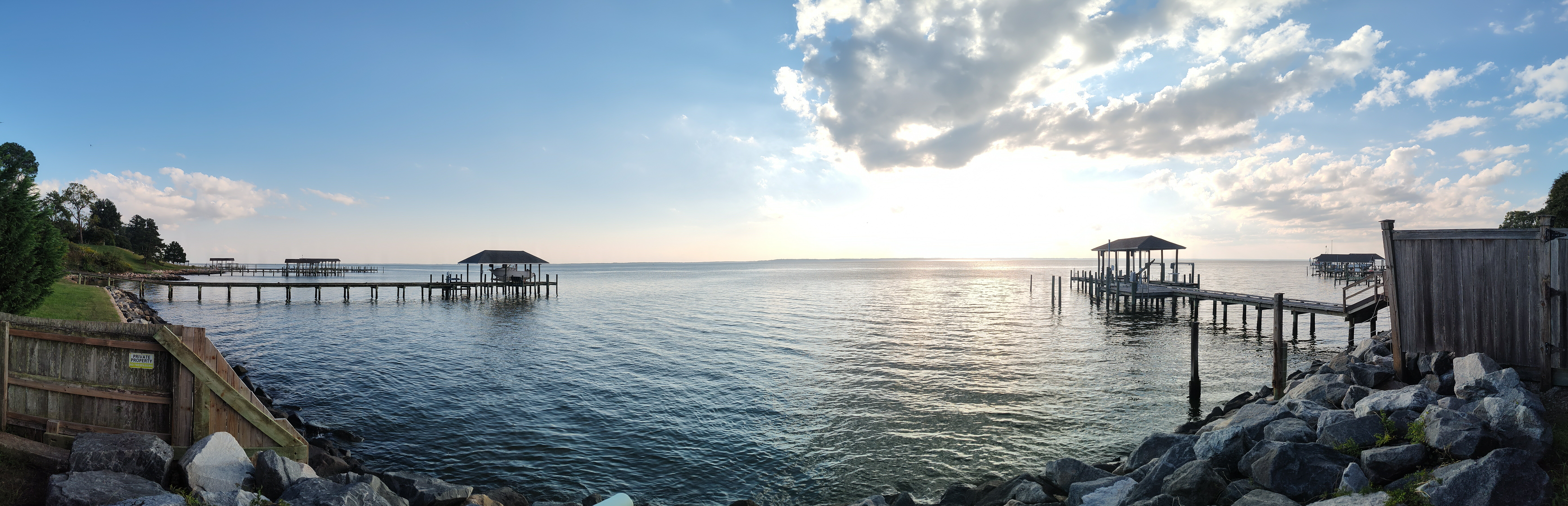
View of James River from Blunt Point, October 2024

== See also ==
- Jamestown, Virginia
- Sir Thomas Gates
- Fort Algernon
- Kecoughtan, Virginia
- Hidenwood
- Anglo-Powhatan Wars
- Warwick County, Virginia
