= Miles Cary =

Virginia planter and politician (d. 1667)

Miles Cary I

Member of the Virginia Governor's Council
- In office 1663–1667

Member of the Virginia House of Burgesses representing Warwick County
- In office 1660–1662 Serving with Edward Griffith
- Preceded by: John Harlowe
- Succeeded by: Edward Griffith

Personal details
- Born: January 1623 Bristol, England
- Died: 10 June 1667 (aged 43–44) Windmill Point plantation, Warwick County, Colony of Virginia
- Spouse: Anne Taylor
- Children: Miles Cary Jr., Thomas Cary, Henry Cary
- Parent(s): John Cary; Alice Hobson
- Relatives: Henry Cary Jr. (grandson), Archibald Cary (great-grandson)
- Occupation: Merchant, Planter, Soldier, Politician

Military service
- Branch/service: Virginia militia
- Rank: colonel
- Battles/wars: Second Anglo-Dutch War

Coat of Arms of Miles Cary

Miles Cary I (January 1623 – 10 June 1667) (later occasionally nicknamed "The Immigrant") was the first member of the Cary family to live in the Thirteen Colonies, and to serve in both houses of the Virginia General Assembly. The son of prominent Bristol families which sustained substantial losses during the English Civil Wars, he emigrated to the Virginia colony by 1645 and opened a store, then married well and developed plantations in Warwick County. Cary held various local offices and twice represented Warwick County as a burgess before being named to the Virginia Governor's Council. Cary amassed significant landholdings, and supported governor William Berkeley. He died at his home of wounds received defending the Virginia colony against a Dutch incursion on the James River six days earlier (5 June 1667). His namesake son and two other descendants of the same name also served in the Virginia General Assembly. His grave is located at Windmill Point in modern day Newport News, formerly Warwick County.
