= Warwick, Virginia =

Extinct independent city in Virginia

Coordinates: 37.13°N 76.54°W

Warwick is an extinct independent city which was located in the state of Virginia in the United States from 1952 until 1958. Formed by a political conversion of the former Warwick County (1634–1952), it is now part of the independent city of Newport News.

== History ==
Warwick River Shire, named for the Warwick River, was established in the British Colony of Virginia by order of King Charles I in 1634. Soon thereafter, it was renamed Warwick County, and eventually became one of the smaller and lesser populated counties in Virginia as the colony grew and after Virginia became a state.

Warwick County remained a primarily farming area until the arrival of the Peninsula Extension of the Chesapeake and Ohio Railway in late 1881. At rural Newport News Point, on the harbor of Hampton Roads, a small community of farms was transformed into a major port for shipping coal.

Virginia has had an independent city political subdivision since 1871. Newport News became an independent city in 1896 from Warwick County by an act of the Virginia General Assembly, one of the few cities in Virginia to have never been first incorporated as a town.

An important feature of independent city status was that it guaranteed protection against annexation of territory by adjacent communities. In 1952, the remaining 71 sq mi (184 km^{2}) of Warwick County became an independent city.

On July 1, 1958, after approval of voters in both jurisdictions, the City of Warwick was consolidated with the independent city of Newport News, reuniting the two communities legally and assuming the latter's name.

At a ribbon cutting ceremony, the widow of Philip W. Hiden, the first mayor of Newport News to serve under a new City Council-City Manager form of government from 1920 to 1924 whose family developed the Hidenwood community joined the widow of Homer L. Ferguson, who had been a President of Newport News Shipbuilding & Dry Dock Company and is credited with initiating development of Hilton Village, as the guests of honor. These elderly ladies helped formalize the reunification of the area which had previously been one single unit of local government from 1634 to 1896. The union formed the third largest city in Virginia at the time with a 65-square-mile (170 km^{2}) area.

With the exception of several minor boundary adjustments with Elizabeth City County and York County, and the annexation by Newport News of the incorporated town of Kecoughtan (formerly in Elizabeth City County) in the 1920s, the boundaries of the city of Newport News as of 2008 are essentially those of Warwick River Shire when it was established in 1634.

== See also ==
- List of former counties, cities, and towns of Virginia
