= Hidenwood =

Coordinates: 37°3′54.5″N 76°30′17.8″W

Hidenwood is a neighborhood in the independent city of Newport News, Virginia which is located off Warwick Boulevard just west of the campus of Christopher Newport University (CNU).

== Nutmeg Quarter Parish ==
Hidenwood begins its history as an early temporary colonial parish commonly known as Nutmeg Quarter in the Colony of Virginia, created by court order 4 March 1628 with appointed minister George Keith. It was made permanent in 1642/43 by a Virginia statute, and specifically separate from the nearby Denbigh parish. In 1656 Nutmeg Quarter Parish was joined with Denbigh Parish at the request of the former's parishioners, who "initiated their desire by reason of their small number no longer to continue a parish...but to be united to the parish of Denbigh." The Nutmeg Quarter Church became a chapel of ease for Denbigh Parish, a reference point in later land patents. The name Nutmeg Quarter is thought to derive from the sassafras or sweet bay trees in the region, since the name "nutmeg" in colonial times could be used to describe any laurel-type plant bearing aromatic fruit. John Leydon and Anne Burras, believed to be the first couple married in colonial Virginia (in 1611), are mentioned having land in Nutmeg Quarter in a 1632 land grant. They are also mentioned having a house in the area in the crown's 1624 Muster Roll. Other land grants mention Capt John Smith, Joseph Stratton, Percival Champion, John Slaughter, Sir Francis Wyatt, Thomas Faulkner, and Robert Newman having land rights in or abutting Nutmeg Quarter.

== Modern Era ==
This area of Warwick County was developed in 1951-1957s by the Hiden family. It was renamed to honor Philip Wallace Hiden, a local businessman and civic leader, and later mayor of Newport News, as well as his wife Martha Woodroof Hiden. The area became a neighborhood in the larger City of Newport News with the consolidation of Warwick County and the city in 1958.

== See also ==
- Blunt Poynt
- Newport News, Virginia
- (former) Warwick County, Virginia
