= Donald M. Hyatt =

American politician (1909–1989)

Mayor of Newport News, Virginia
- In office 1962–1970
- Preceded by: Oscar J. Brittingham, Jr.
- Succeeded by: J. William Hornsby

Personal details
- Born: June 7, 1909 Waynesville, North Carolina, U.S.
- Died: April 16, 1989 (aged 79) Newport News, Virginia, U.S.

Donald M. Hyatt (June 7, 1909 – April 16, 1989) was the mayor of Newport News, Virginia from July 1, 1962 to June 30, 1970. He is perhaps best remembered for participating in a march through downtown Newport News following the assassination of Martin Luther King Jr., despite threats received by the police chief that if he did so, he "would not reach the foot of 25th Street alive". At the Newport News Victory Arch, he called on the black community of the city to "work together to build this community ... in mutual respect." He was born in Waynesville, North Carolina and died at Newport News in 1989.

Preceded by Oscar J. Brittingham Jr.	Mayor of Newport News; 1962–1970	Succeeded by J. William Hornsby
