= National Register of Historic Places listings in Newport News, Virginia =

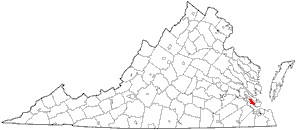
Location of Newport News in Virginia

This is a list of the National Register of Historic Places listings in Newport News, Virginia.

This is intended to be a complete list of the properties and districts on the National Register of Historic Places in the independent city of Newport News, Virginia, United States. The locations of National Register properties and districts for which the latitude and longitude coordinates are included below, may be seen in an online map.

There are 39 properties and districts listed on the National Register in the city.

This National Park Service list is complete through NPS recent listings posted July 10, 2026.

== Current listings ==
	Name on the Register	Image	Date listed	Location	Description
1	Basic Construction Company Headquarters Building	Basic Construction Company Headquarters Building	April 15, 2019 (#100003614)	80 29th St. 36°58′45″N 76°26′05″W	
2	Boldrup Plantation Archeological Site	Boldrup Plantation Archeological Site	September 16, 1982 (#82004573)	Address Restricted; 37°08′00″N 76°34′32″W	
3	Causey's Mill	Causey's Mill	February 21, 2008 (#08000078)	11700 Warwick Rd. 37°03′32″N 76°29′01″W	
4	Simon Reid Curtis House	Simon Reid Curtis House	August 20, 2009 (#09000641)	10 Elmhurst St. 37°11′38″N 76°34′20″W	
5	Daily Press Building		December 29, 2025 (#100012478)	7505 Warwick Boulevard; 37°00′56″N 76°26′58″W	
6	Dam No. One Battlefield Site	Dam No. One Battlefield Site	August 4, 1995 (#95000972)	13560 Jefferson Ave. 37°11′20″N 76°32′41″W	
7	Denbigh Plantation Site	Denbigh Plantation Site	February 16, 1970 (#70000873)	Route 60, Newport News; 37°05′25″N 76°32′20″W	
8	Endview Plantation	Endview Plantation	May 8, 2008 (#08000391)	362 Yorktown Rd. 37°12′41″N 76°34′08″W	
9	James A. Fields House	James A. Fields House	June 6, 2002 (#02000623)	617 27th St. 36°58′59″N 76°25′17″W	
10	First Baptist Church-Newport News	First Baptist Church-Newport News	May 11, 2000 (#00000774)	119 29th St. 36°58′48″N 76°25′59″W	
11	First Denbigh Parish Church Archeological Site	First Denbigh Parish Church Archeological Site	September 7, 1982 (#82004574)	Address Restricted; 37°05′37″N 76°32′36″W	
12	Fort Crafford	Fort Crafford	May 17, 1974 (#74002237)	Fort Eustis Military Reservation on Mulberry Island Point; 37°07′42″N 76°37′05″W	
13	Greenlawn Cemetery	Greenlawn Cemetery	February 5, 1999 (#99000139)	2700 Parish Ave. 36°59′50″N 76°24′15″W	
14	Hilton Village	Hilton Village	June 23, 1969 (#69000341)	Bounded by the James River, Post St., the former Chesapeake and Ohio railroad tracks, and Hopkins St. 37°01′51″N 76°27′44″W	
15	Hotel Warwick	Hotel Warwick	October 4, 1984 (#84000044)	25th St. and West Ave. 36°58′37″N 76°25′55″W	
16	Matthew Jones House	Matthew Jones House	June 11, 1969 (#69000342)	Taylor Ave. and Harrison Rd., Fort Eustis; 37°09′37″N 76°36′11″W	
17	Lee Hall	Lee Hall	December 5, 1972 (#72001510)	Near the junction of U.S. Route 60 and State Route 238; 37°11′59″N 76°34′32″W	
18	Lee Hall Depot	Lee Hall Depot	September 24, 2010 (#10000793)	9 Elmhurst St. 37°11′40″N 76°34′22″W	
19	Lee's Mill Earthworks	Lee's Mill Earthworks	June 23, 2003 (#03000568)	280 Rivers Ridge Cir. 37°09′54″N 76°33′55″W	
20	Medical Arts Building	Medical Arts Building	September 14, 2002 (#02001001)	2901 West Ave. 36°58′47″N 76°26′03″W	
21	Newport News Downtown Historic District		August 4, 2023 (#100009200)	Warwick Blvd., 37th, 23rd, and 31st Sts., West and Washington Aves. 36°58′54″N 76°25′58″W	
22	Newport News Middle Ground Light Station	Newport News Middle Ground Light Station	December 2, 2002 (#02001438)	Approximately 2 miles (3.2 km) south-southeast of Newport News; 36°56′42″N 76°23′29″W	
23	Newport News Public Library	Newport News Public Library	August 17, 2005 (#05000894)	2907 West Ave. 36°58′48″N 76°26′03″W	
24	J. Thomas Newsome House	J. Thomas Newsome House	December 19, 1990 (#90001831)	2803 Oak Ave. 36°59′25″N 76°24′19″W	
25	Noland Company Building	Noland Company Building	May 21, 2010 (#10000283)	2600 Warwick Boulevard; 36°58′50″N 76°25′37″W	
26	North End Historic District	North End Historic District	August 28, 1986 (#86001999)	Roughly bounded by 68th St., Warwick Boulevard, 50th St., and Huntington Ave. 37°00′02″N 76°26′27″W	
27	Queen Hith Plantation Complex Site		February 24, 1983 (#83003293)	Address Restricted; 37°10′48″N 76°35′04″W	
28	Restaurant, 2108 Jefferson Avenue		July 21, 2026 (#100013236)	2108 Jefferson Avenue; 36°58′43″N 76°25′09″W	
29	Richneck Plantation Site	Richneck Plantation Site	July 8, 1977 (#77001535)	George J. McIntosh Elementary School, 185 Richneck Rd. 37°08′50″N 76°31′46″W	
30	Riverside Apartments		July 28, 1983 (#83003294)	4500-4600 Washington Ave. 36°59′28″N 76°26′18″W	
31	St. Vincent de Paul Catholic Church	St. Vincent de Paul Catholic Church	June 2, 2005 (#05000525)	230 33rd St. 36°59′00″N 76°25′55″W	
32	Skiffes Creek Sand Spit Site	Skiffes Creek Sand Spit Site	February 24, 1983 (#83003295)	Address Restricted	
33	Smith's Pharmacy	Smith's Pharmacy	June 6, 2002 (#02000618)	3114 Chestnut Ave. 36°59′30″N 76°24′32″W	
34	Southern Terminal Redoubt	Southern Terminal Redoubt	February 24, 1983 (#83003296)	End of Enterprise Dr. 37°10′33″N 76°35′38″W	One of several archaeological sites in the Oakland Farm Industrial Park
35	Stuart Gardens Apartments		August 12, 2025 (#100012123)	Garden Drive, Roanoke Avenue, 16th Street, Jebs Place; 36°58′47″N 76°24′04″W	
36	Temple Sinai	Temple Sinai	May 18, 2015 (#15000252)	11620 Warwick Boulevard; 37°03′26″N 76°28′55″W	
37	Walker-Wilkins-Bloxom Warehouse Historic District	Walker-Wilkins-Bloxom Warehouse Historic District	August 13, 2020 (#100005443)	208-218 23rd St. 36°58′36″N 76°25′46″W	
38	Warwick County Courthouses	Warwick County Courthouses	November 3, 1988 (#88002186)	Old Courthouse Way; 37°07′47″N 76°32′32″W	
39	Whittaker Memorial Hospital	Whittaker Memorial Hospital	September 30, 2009 (#09000794)	1003 28th St. 36°59′16″N 76°24′45″W	

== See also ==
- List of National Historic Landmarks in Virginia
- National Register of Historic Places listings in Virginia
- National Register of Historic Places listings in York County, Virginia
