= National Register of Historic Places listings in York County, Virginia =

Location of York County in Virginia

This is a list of the National Register of Historic Places listings in York County, Virginia.

This is intended to be a complete list of the properties and districts on the National Register of Historic Places in York County, Virginia, United States. The locations of National Register properties and districts for which the latitude and longitude coordinates are included below, may be seen in an online map.

There are 12 properties and districts listed on the National Register in the county.

This National Park Service list is complete through NPS recent listings posted February 6, 2026.

== Current listings ==
	Name on the Register	Image	Date listed	Location	City or town	Description
1	Bruton Parish Poorhouse Archeological Site	Bruton Parish Poorhouse Archeological Site	September 2, 1982 (#82004610)	State Route 132; 37°17′46″N 76°41′20″W	Williamsburg	Sits on a hill about 600 feet (180 m) north-northeast of Queens Creek
2	Bryan Manor	Bryan Manor	November 14, 1978 (#78003048)	Off Queens Creek Rd. 37°16′10″N 76°39′25″W	Williamsburg	
3	Colonial National Historical Park	Colonial National Historical Park	October 15, 1966 (#66000839)	Colonial Parkway; 37°13′44″N 76°30′00″W	Yorktown	
4	William Gooch Tomb and York Village Archeological Site	William Gooch Tomb and York Village Archeological Site	January 18, 1974 (#74002153)	Perimeter Rd. at the U.S. Coast Guard Training Center; 37°12′56″N 76°28′42″W	Yorktown	Boundaries decreased on February 11, 1999
5	Grace Church	Grace Church	September 15, 1970 (#70000832)	Church and Main Sts. 37°14′09″N 76°30′28″W	Yorktown	
6	Kiskiack	Kiskiack	November 12, 1969 (#69000287)	Northeast of the junction of State Routes 168 and 238; 37°14′27″N 76°33′51″W	Lackey	
7	Oak Grove Baptist Church Historic District	Oak Grove Baptist Church Historic District	March 13, 2023 (#100008134)	529 Waller Mill Rd., Airport Rd., Rochambeau Ave. 37°17′58″N 76°42′24″W	Williamsburg vicinity	
8	Old Custom House	Old Custom House	June 3, 1999 (#99000682)	Junction of Main and Read Sts. 37°14′05″N 76°30′28″W	Yorktown	
9	Porto Bello	Porto Bello	April 13, 1973 (#73002068)	On Queens Creek, in Camp Peary Military Reservation; 37°18′02″N 76°38′40″W	Williamsburg	
10	Sessions-Pope-Shield House	Sessions-Pope-Shield House	June 23, 2003 (#03000572)	600 Main St. 37°14′03″N 76°30′25″W	Yorktown	
11	Whitaker's Mill Archeological Complex	Whitaker's Mill Archeological Complex	May 15, 2008 (#08000426)	Along King's Creek near Interstate 64 and State Route 199; 37°15′20″N 76°38′05″W	Williamsburg	
12	Yorktown Wrecks	Yorktown Wrecks	October 9, 1973 (#73002069)	Address Restricted	Yorktown	

== See also ==
- List of National Historic Landmarks in Virginia
- National Register of Historic Places listings in Virginia
- National Register of Historic Places listings in Newport News, Virginia
