= East End (Newport News, Virginia) =

Coordinates: 36°58′36″N 76°24′24″W

The East End is an area of the independent city of Newport News, Virginia, located in the older portion of the port city near the harbor of Hampton Roads.

== Notable residents ==
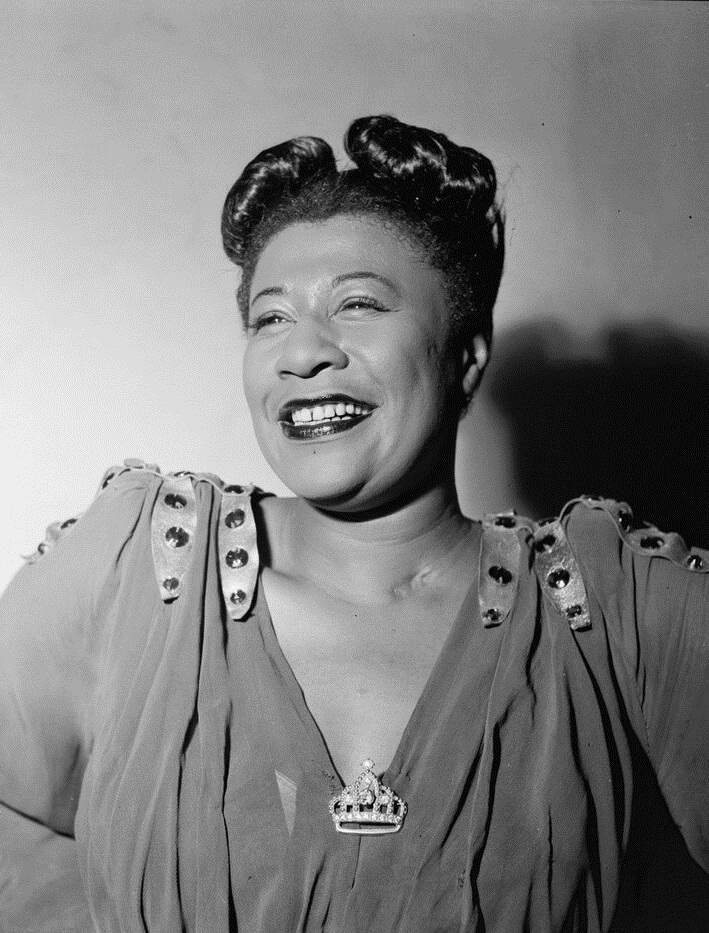
Ella Fitzgerald, 1946

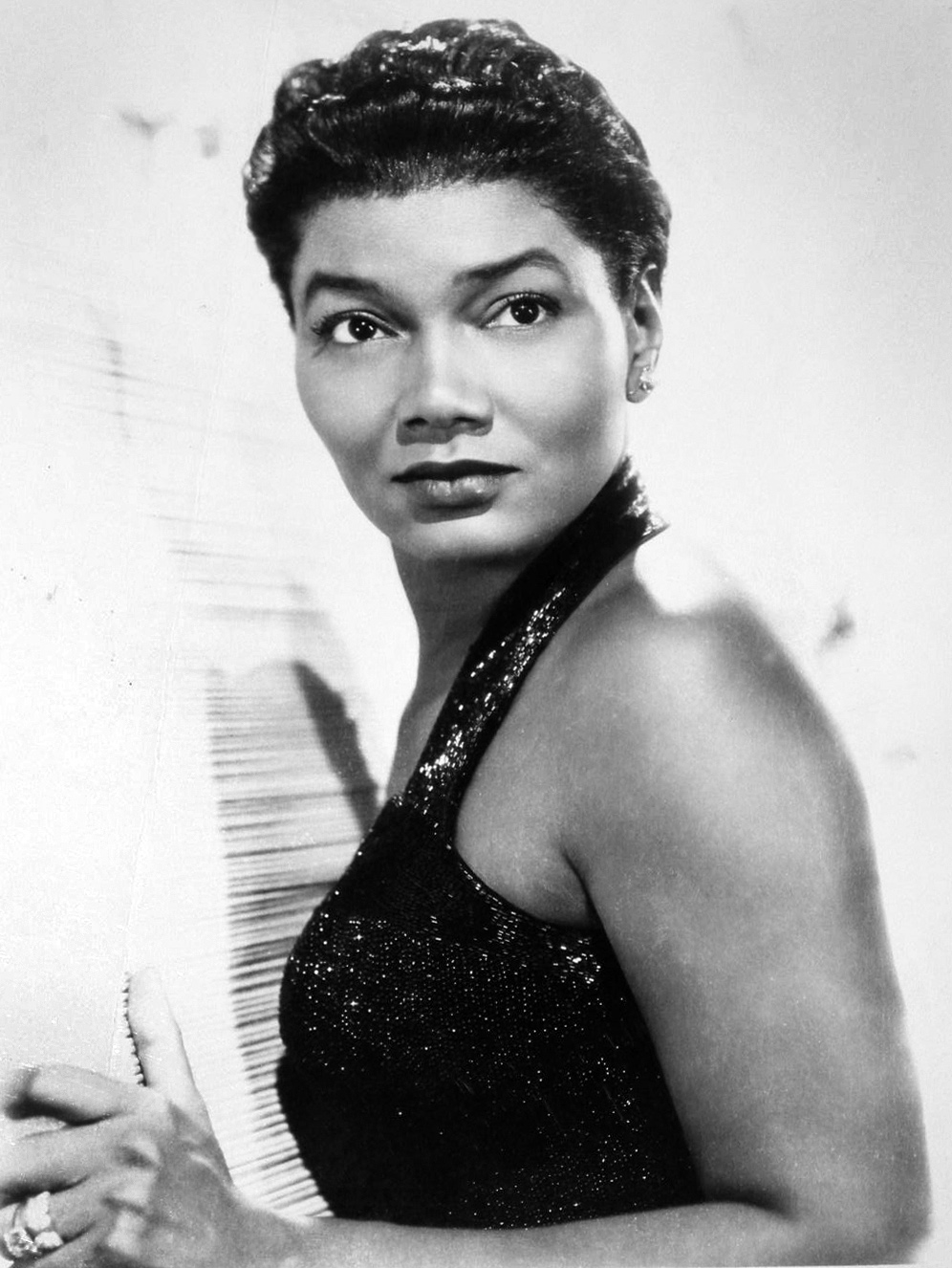
Pearl Bailey, c. 1960

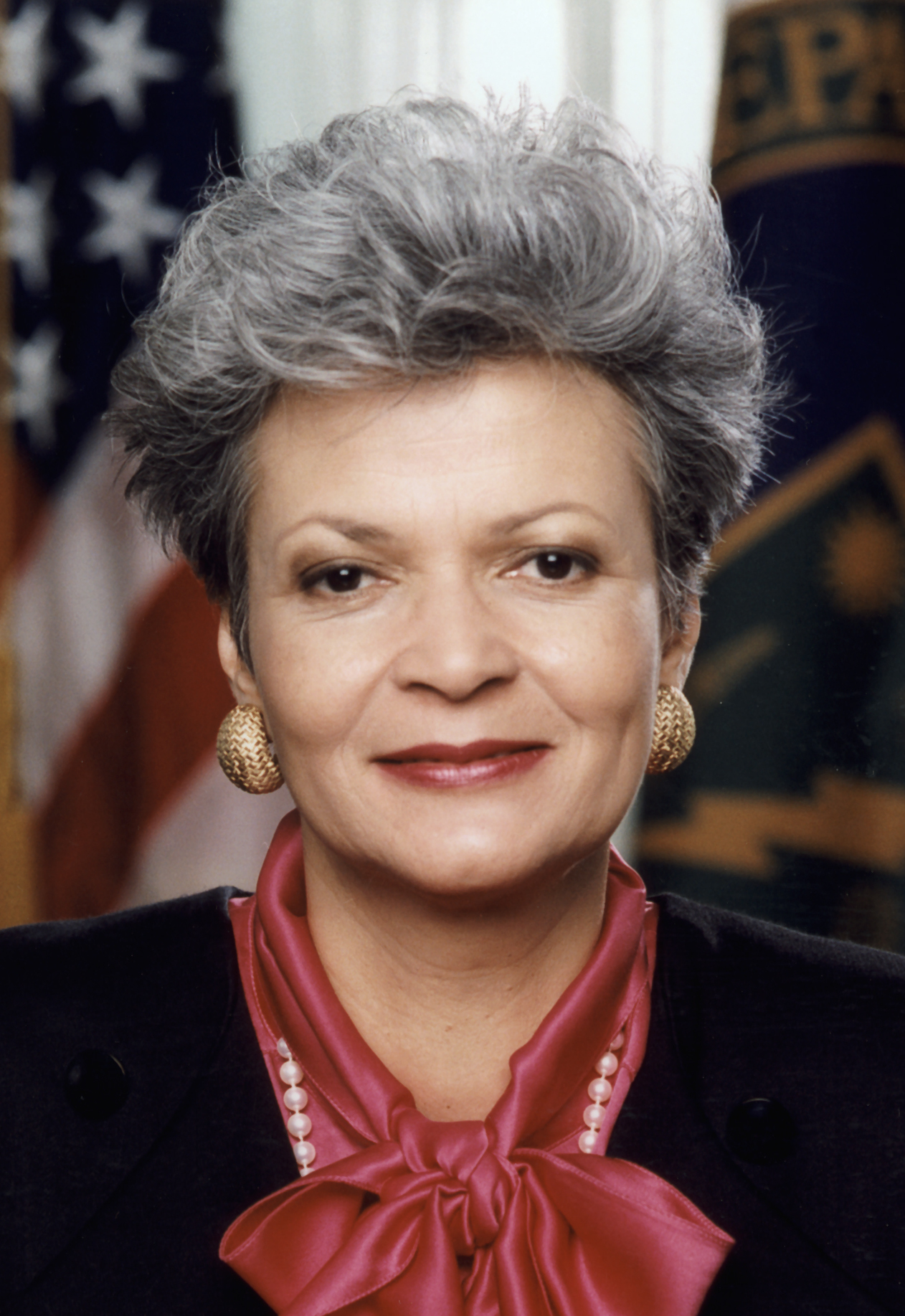
Hazel O'Leary, 1993
- Aaron Brooks – American football player (born 1976)
- Earl Faison – American football player (1939–2016), attended Huntington High School
- Ella Fitzgerald – American jazz singer (1917–1996)
- Hazel R. O'Leary – American government official and university administrator (born 1937)
- Joe Durham – American baseball player and coach (1931–2016), attended Huntington High School
- Marcus Vick – American football player (born 1984)
- Michael Vick – American football player and coach (born 1980)
- Pearl Bailey – American actress and singer (1918–1990)

== Historic sites ==
National Register of Historic Places
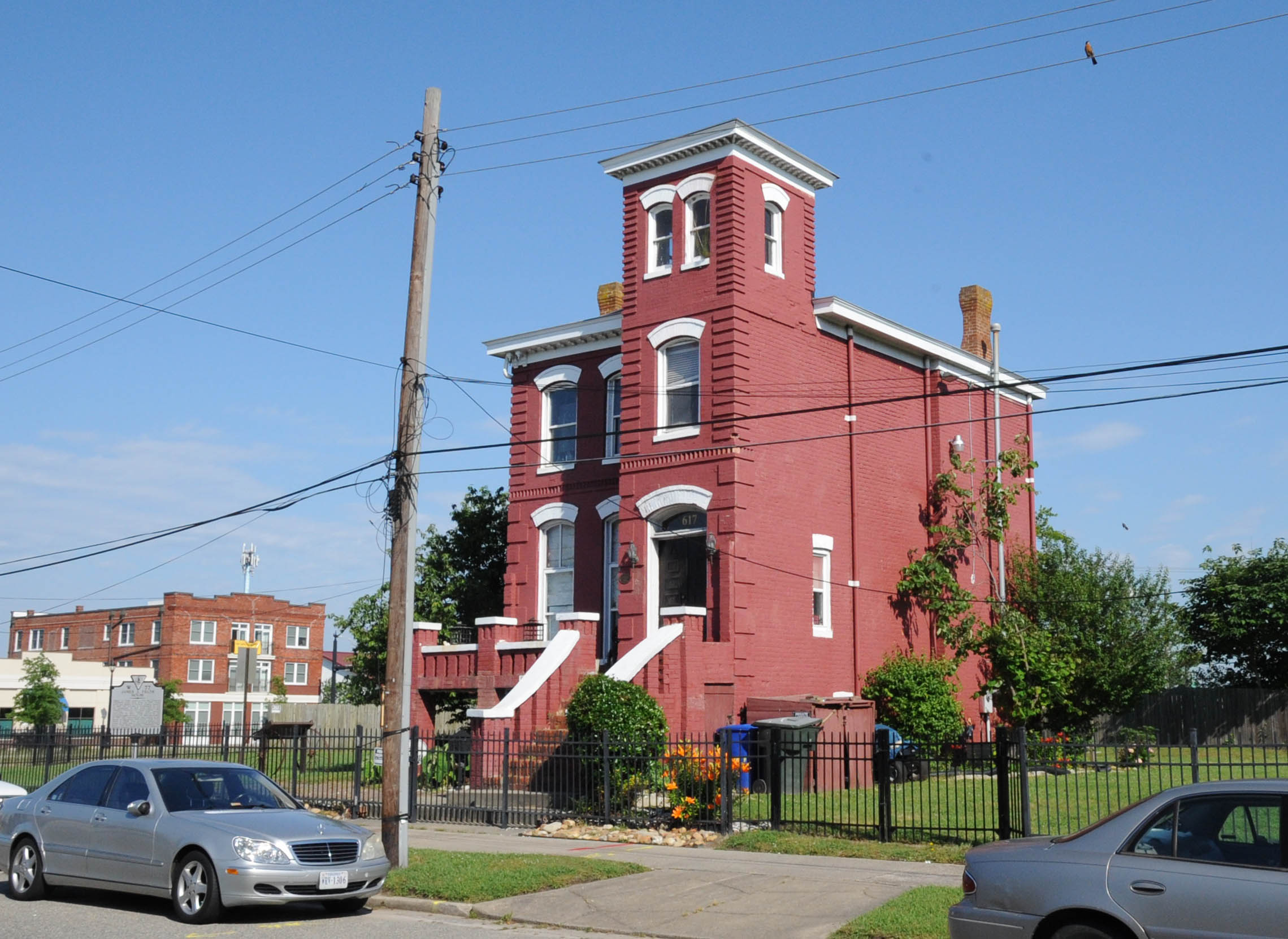
James A. Fields House

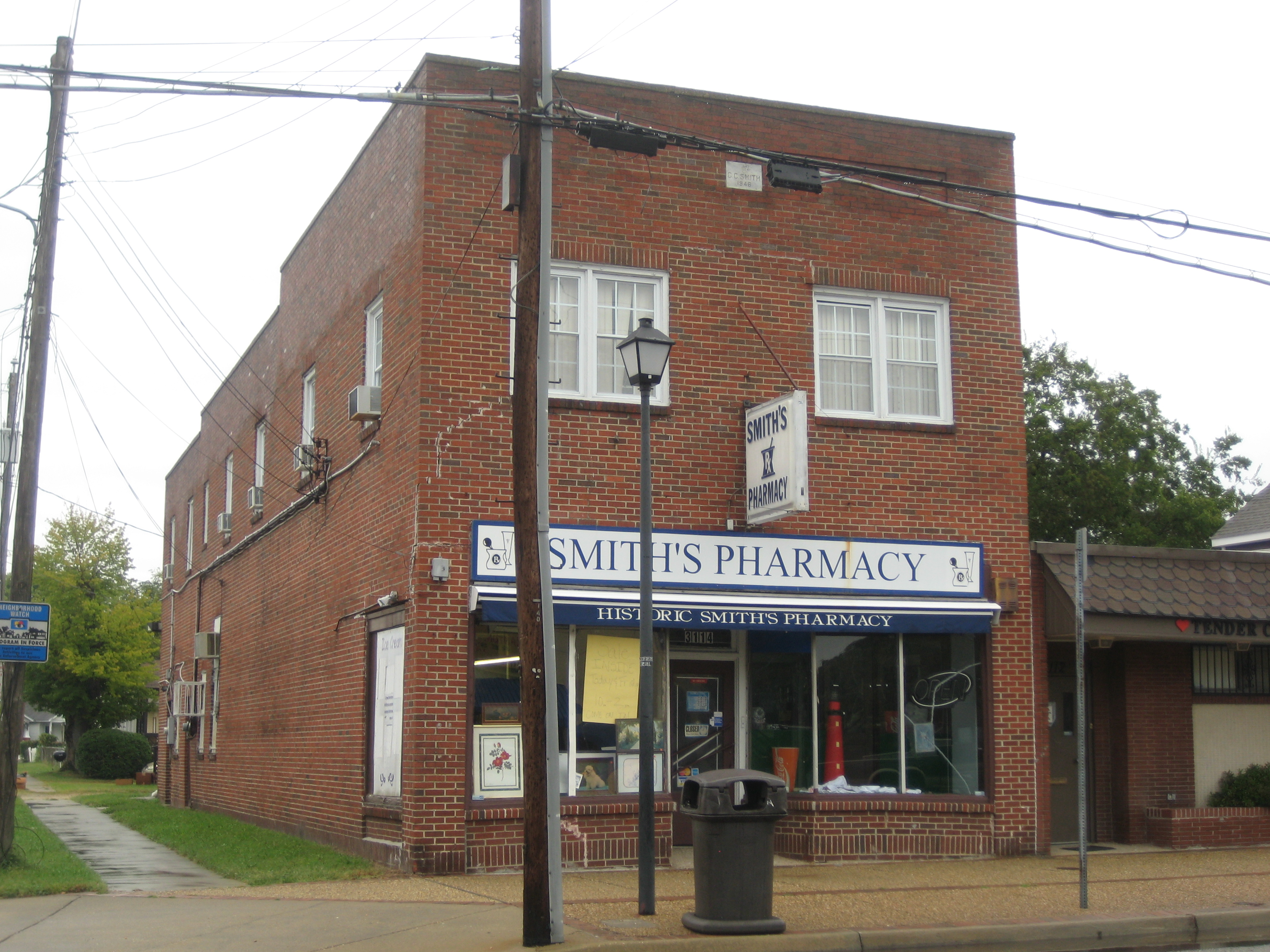
Smith's Pharmacy

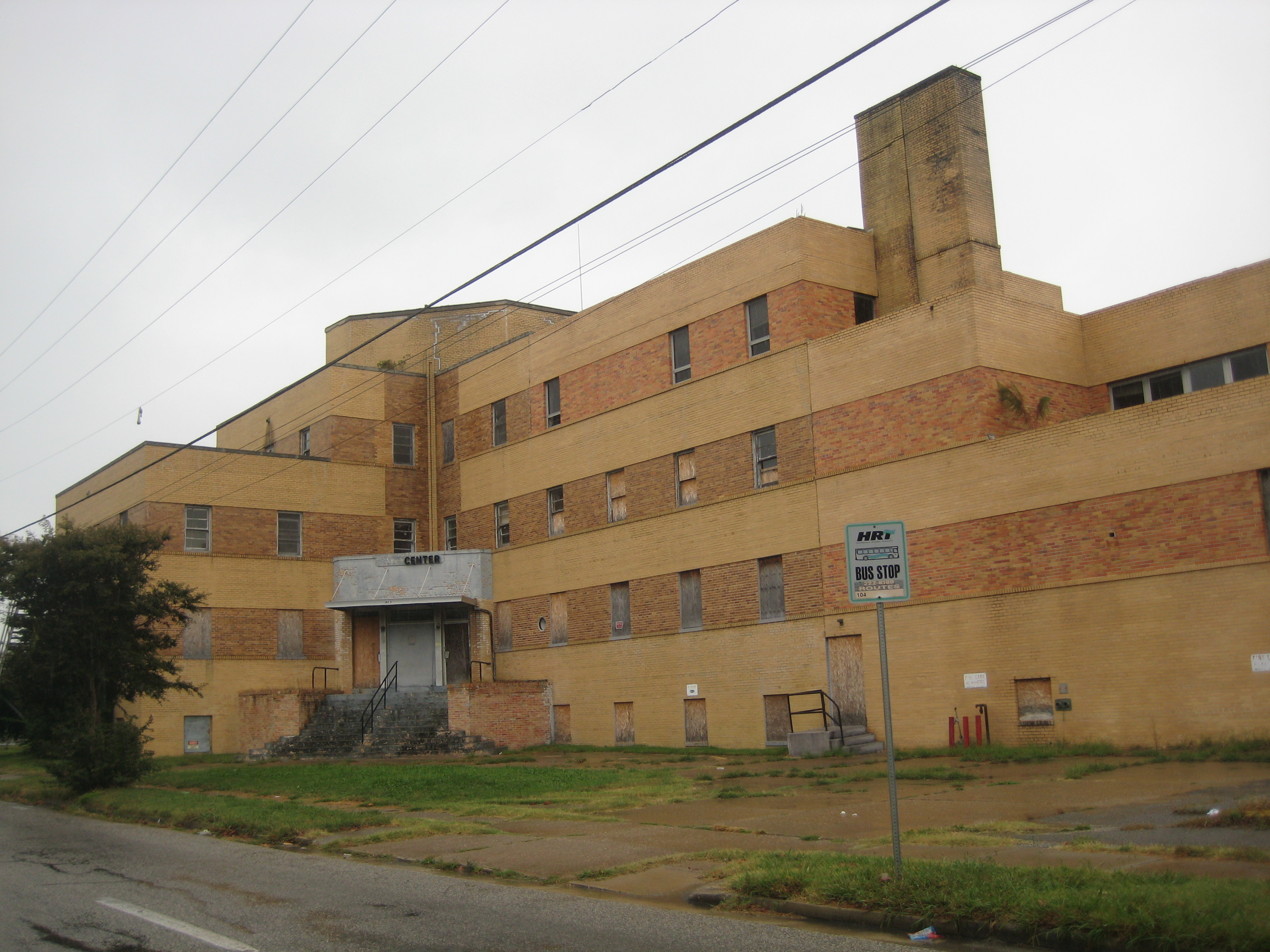
Whittaker Memorial Hospital
- Collis P. Huntington High School – Former African-American high school during the racial segregation era
- J. Thomas Newsome House – Historic home, museum, and cultural center
- James A. Fields House – Historic house in Virginia, US
- Smith's Pharmacy – Historic commercial building
- Whittaker Memorial Hospital – Hospital in Newport News, Virginia, United States
