= Whitaker's Mill Archeological Complex =

Archaeological site in Virginia, United States

- U.S. National Register of Historic Places
- U.S. Historic district
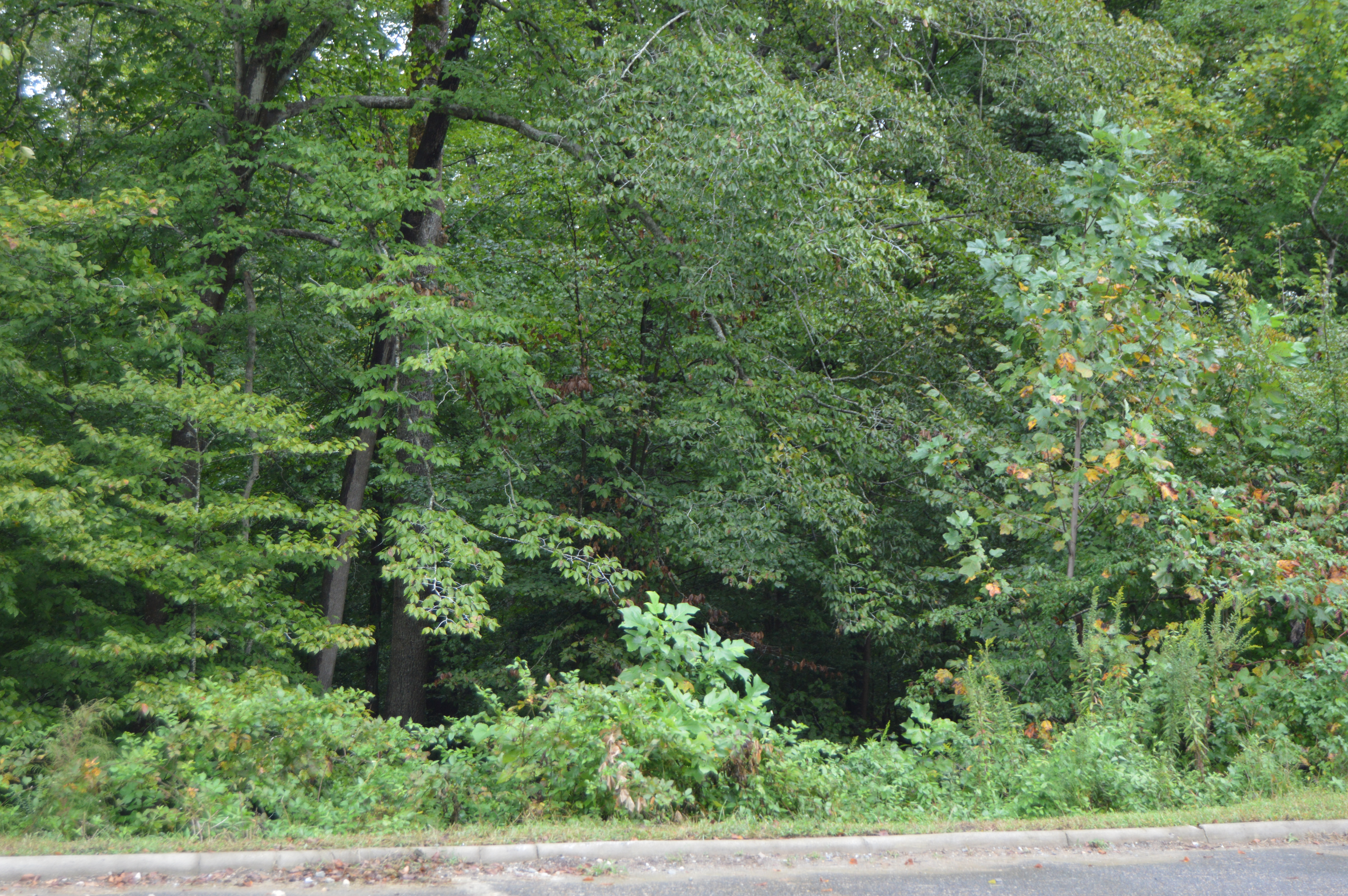
- Edge of the site

- Location within Virginia Location within the United States
- Location: Along King's Creek near Interstate 64 and State Route 199
- Nearest city: Williamsburg, Virginia
- Coordinates: 37°15′20″N 76°38′5″W
- Area: 12.2 acres (4.9 ha)
- Built: 1862
- NRHP reference No.: 08000426
- Added to NRHP: May 15, 2008

Whitaker's Mill Archeological Complex, also known as Burwell's Mill, is the site of an early colonial mill complex in York County near Williamsburg. Located on the historic King's Creek Plantation near Route 199 and Water Country Parkway, the site has industrial remains of millworks from the 17th and 18th centuries, as well as military encampment sites associated with the American Revolutionary War and the American Civil War.

The site was listed on the National Register of Historic Places in 2008.

== See also ==
- National Register of Historic Places listings in York County, Virginia
