= Temple Sinai (Newport News, Virginia) =

United States historic temple

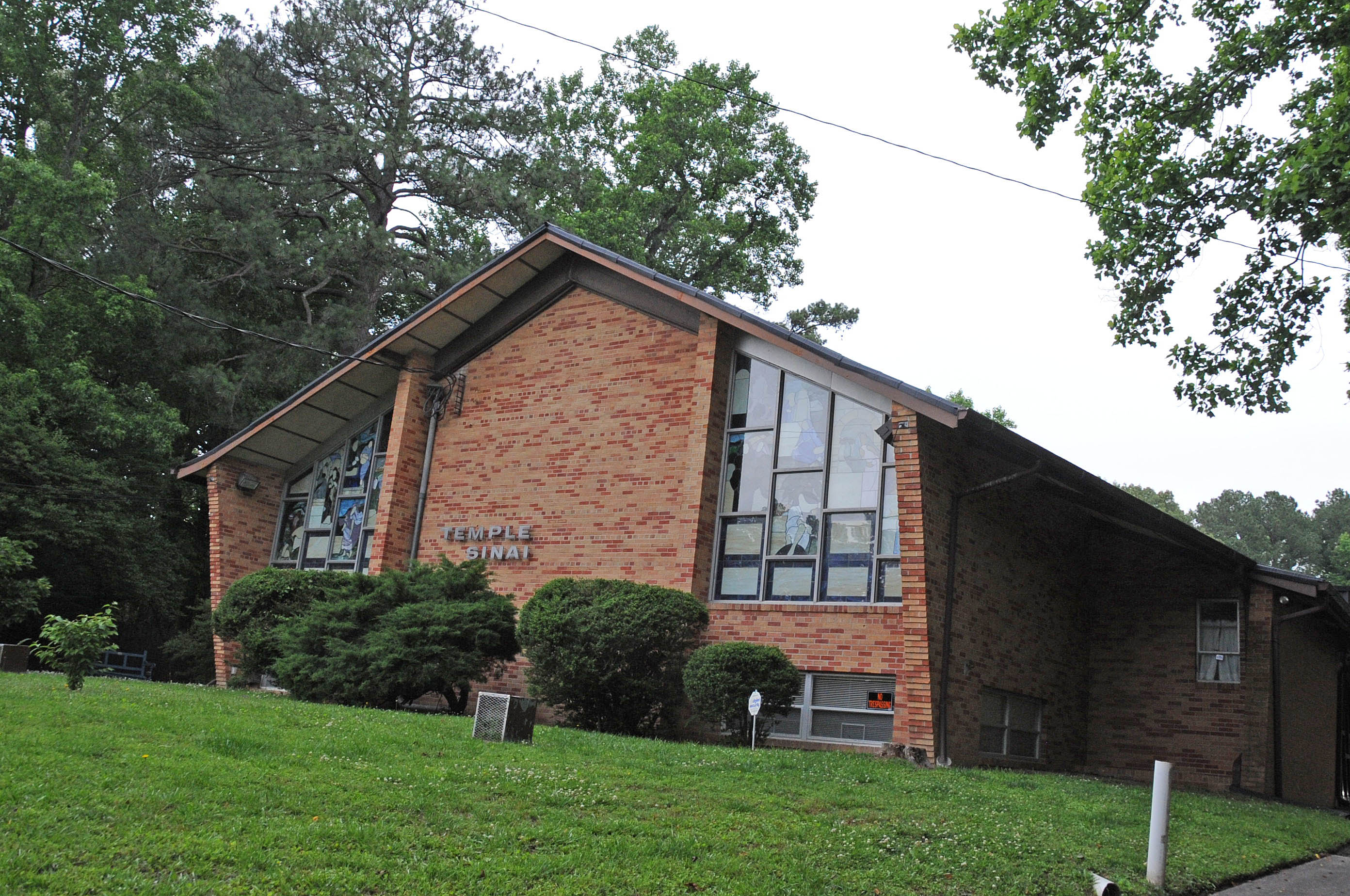
- Temple Sinai

- Location in Virginia

Religion
- Affiliation: Reform Judaism
- Ecclesiastical or organisational status: Synagogue
- Leadership: Rabbi Séverine Sokol
- Status: Active

Location
- Location: 11620 Warwick Boulevard in Newport News, Virginia 23601
- Country: United States
- Coordinates: 37°3′26″N 76°28′55″W

Architecture
- Architect: Edward Loewenstein
- Type: Synagogue
- Style: Modernist
- Established: 1912 (as a congregation)
- Completed: 1960
- Materials: Brick veneer

Website
- templesinai-nn.org
- Temple Sinai
- U.S. National Register of Historic Places
- Area: less than one acre
- NRHP reference No.: 15000252
- Added to NRHP: May 18, 2015

Temple Sinai is an historic Reform Jewish synagogue located at 11620 Warwick Boulevard in Newport News, Virginia, in the United States.

== Description ==
Established in 1955, the congregation was the first (and to date is the only) Reform congregation on the Virginia Peninsula. Its building was designed by Edward Loewenstein and completed in 1960, and is a locally significant example of Modernist architecture. The synagogue building is a roughly rectangular single-story building, finished in brick veneer, with a projecting trapezoidal entrance.

The building was listed on the National Register of Historic Places in 2015.

== See also ==
- National Register of Historic Places in Newport News, Virginia
