= Bruton Parish Church =

Historic church in Virginia, US

- U.S. National Register of Historic Places
- U.S. National Historic Landmark
- Virginia Landmarks Register
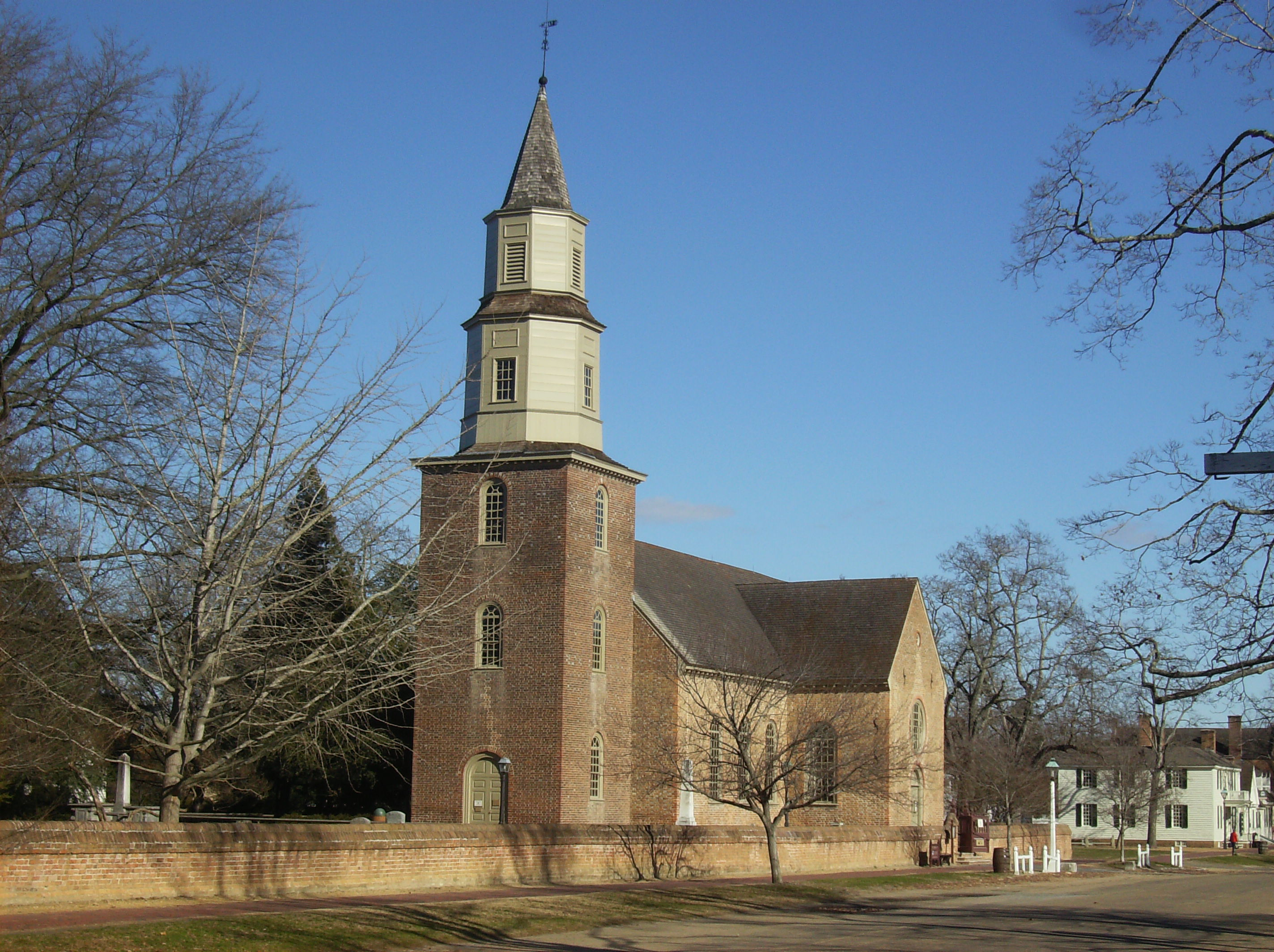
- Bruton Parish Church from Duke of Gloucester Street

- Location within Virginia Location within the United States
- Location: Williamsburg, Virginia
- Coordinates: 37°16′16″N 76°42′10″W
- Area: C.H.A.
- Built: 1677
- Architect: Alexander Spotswood
- Architectural style: Georgian
- Website: http://www.brutonparish.org/
- NRHP reference No.: 70000861
- VLR No.: 137-0007

Significant dates
- Added to NRHP: May 10, 1970
- Designated NHL: April 15, 1970
- Designated VLR: September 18, 1973

Bruton Parish Church is located in the restored area of Colonial Williamsburg in Williamsburg, Virginia, United States. It was established in 1674 by the consolidation of two previous parishes in the Virginia Colony, and remains an active Episcopal parish. The building, constructed 1711–15, was designated a National Historic Landmark in 1970 as a well-preserved early example of colonial religious architecture.

== History ==
The roots of Bruton Parish Church trace back to both the Church of England and the new settlement of the Colony of Virginia at Jamestown in the early 17th century. The role of the church and its relationship to the government had been established by King Henry VIII some years earlier. The same relationship was established in the new colony.

=== 1607: the Church of England in the new Virginia Colony ===
When the English colony was established at Jamestown on May 14, 1607, the conduct of worship and the building of a primitive chapel were given priority even as the first fort was built. The Reverend Robert Hunt served as the first chaplain. He had been the chaplain appointed to serve as spiritual leader of the three-ship expedition headed by Christopher Newport, and he lit the candle for the Anglican Church in Virginia a few weeks earlier when he first lifted his voice in public thanksgiving and prayer on April 29, as the settlers made what has come to be known as their "First Landing" near the entrance to the Chesapeake Bay. He also was the one to plant the cross at Cape Henry (which they named after Henry Frederick, Prince of Wales, the eldest son of King James I).

Captain John Smith described the Reverend Mr Hunt as our honest, religious and courageous divine. In his role as religious leader, he was a peacemaker, often bringing harmony to a quarreling group of men. Hunt was among those who did not survive that first year. After five very difficult years, during which the majority of the constant flow of colonists did not survive, the colony began to grow. As in England, the parish became a unit of local importance equal in power and practical aspects to other entities such as the courts and even the House of Burgesses.

The earlier settlements were along the major waterways, such as the James River and the York River. The expansion and subdivision of the church parishes and shires (counties) of Virginia after 1634 both followed this growth. Parishes needed to be close enough for travel to church for worship, an obligation everyone was expected to fulfil. (A parish was normally led spiritually by a rector and governed by a committee of members generally respected in the community which was known as the vestry).

=== Growth of the Colony: 1632 Middle Plantation ===
The interior area of the Virginia Peninsula was not settled until a period beginning in the 1630s when a stockade was completed across the Peninsula between Archer's Hope Creek (later College Creek) and Queen's Creek, each navigable to an opposing river.

Dr John Potts figured prominently in the early development. In 1625, he was commissioned a member of the Governor's Council, on which he served for a number of years. In 1628 he was chosen Governor, and held the position from 1629 until the early part of 1630, when he was superseded by Sir John Harvey.

Dr Potts had a plantation which he called "Harrop", possibly named in honor of his ancestral home, Harrop, in Cheshire, England, where some of the Potts family resided at that period. (This plantation, patented in 1631, may be related to the Harrop Parish established in 1644, which years later became part of Bruton Parish).

On July 12, 1632, Dr Potts obtained a patent for 1,200 acres (4.9 km^{2}) at the head of Archer's Hope Creek. Part of this land was to become the fortified palisade across the peninsula. Palisades, six miles (10 km) in length, were run from creek to creek, and, on the ridge between, a settlement to be called Middle Plantation was made. Middle Plantation consisted of property owned by Colonel John Page (26 December 1628 – 23 January 1692). John Page was a member of the Virginia House of Burgesses and the Council of the Virginia Colony. A wealthy landowner, Page donated land and funds for the first brick Bruton Parish Church. Col. Page was a prime force behind the small community gaining the site for the College of William and Mary, Founded in 1693. He was also a chief proponent of the village (that later became Williamsburg) and donated more land to create the village.

The Dr. Potts would have certainly recognized the sanitary advantages of the country around Middle Plantation. As the ridge between the creeks was remarkably well drained, there were few mosquitoes. The deep ravines penetrating from the north and south made the place of much strategic value. Also, the only practical road down the Peninsula was over this ridge, and this road was easily defended. At Middle Plantation, some years later, this road was later to be called Duke of Gloucester Street, and it would later form the dividing boundary line between portions of James City and York County for many years.

=== Middle Plantation becomes a town ===
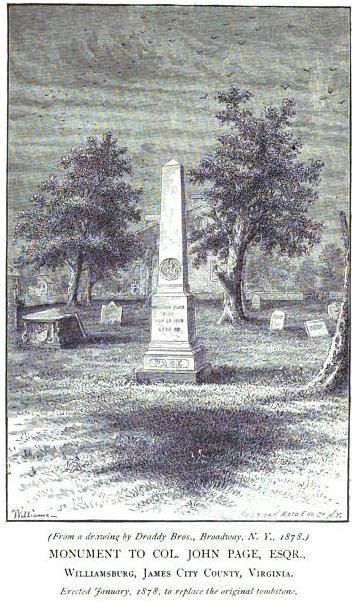
Monument to Col. John Page, Bruton Parish Churchyard

Despite the favorable location, development of Middle Plantation as a residential and trade community did not immediately take place. The area was still on the edge of the frontier and subject to attacks by the Native Americans, who were being crowded out of their homeland by the ever-expanding colony. This was especially true prior to the second major conflict with the Powhatan Confederacy in 1644, after which a peace was established. Although the local Natives had basically been overwhelmed and subdued, conflicts continued further west with tribal groups other than the Powhatan.

After 1644, the interior areas of the Peninsula such as that of Middle Plantation became more attractive for settlement. By the 1650s, Middle Plantation began to look both populated and wealthy, straddling the boundary between James City County and York County. Colonel John Page, a merchant who had emigrated from Middlesex, England with his wife Alice Luckin Page in 1650, was largely responsible for building Middle Plantation into a substantial town. In an era of wooden buildings, brick was a sign of both wealth and permanence. Page built a large, brick house in Middle Plantation and began encouraging the growth of the area. The Ludwell brothers (Thomas and Phillip) also built a substantial brick home, even larger than that of Page. The houses that Page and the Ludwells built were among the finest in the colony. Another brick house was built nearby by the Pages' eldest son, Francis. By the third quarter of the 17th century, Middle Plantation must have looked like a place of importance.

=== Worship in Middle Plantation ===
In 1633, according to records, Middle Plantation Parish was established. It is known there was a wooden church by around 1660, but little else is known. In 1658, Middle Plantation Parish was united with Harrop Parish in James City County in 1658 to form Middletown Parish.

Bruton Parish was formed in 1674 when Marston Parish (formed in 1654) in York County merged with Middletown Parish. The first vestrymen for Bruton Parish, named at its creation in 1674, were Col. Thomas Ballard Sr., Daniel Parke, Col. John Page, James Besouth, Robert Cobbs, James Bray, Capt. Philip Chesley and William Aylett.

The name of the parish comes from the town of Bruton, in the English county of Somerset, which was the ancestral home to several leading colonial figures, notably Virginia's colonial secretary Thomas Ludwell and the Ludwell family, as well as that of the Royal Governor, Sir William Berkeley. By this time, the Ludwells were living in Middle Plantation, and the idea of moving the capital there had been put forth unsuccessfully at least once. Bruton Parish was about 10 miles (16 km) square.

Colonel Page donated a plot of land about 144 feet (44 m) by 180 feet (55 m) and funds for building a brick church and for the surrounding churchyard in 1678. In return for his donation of land and funds towards the new church, Col. Page was allowed to have his family seated in a special pew at the front of the church in the chancel ahead of the congregation.

Other subscribers pledged additional funds. The construction contract was awarded in June 1681 and the building was complete by November 29, 1683. The first rector, the Reverend Rowland Jones, dedicated the structure on January 6, 1684 at the Epiphany.

Completed in 1683, the brick church, about 60 feet (18 m) by 24 feet (7.3 m), rose to the north and west of the present church building and only a few steps northwest. The buried foundations remain.

=== Country parish changes its role ===
Conditions at Jamestown had made it problematic to serve as capital of the colony, and during the second half of the 17th century, sessions of the House of Burgesses and Governor's Council had periodically relocated to Middle Plantation, or longtime Governor Sir William Berkeley's Green Spring Plantation, both relatively nearby, and considered both safer and healthier locations than Jamestown Island. This and another situation combined to bring tiny Middle Plantation and Bruton Parish to prominence in the colony.

In 1691, the House of Burgesses sent the Reverend James Blair, the colony's top religious leader and rector of Henrico Parish at Varina, to England to secure a charter to establish "a certain Place of Universal Study, a perpetual College of Divinity, Philosophy, Languages, and the good arts and sciences...to be supported and maintained, in all time coming." Blair journeyed to London and began a vigorous campaign. With support from his friends, Henry Compton, the Bishop of London, and John Tillotson (Archbishop of Canterbury), Blair was ultimately successful.

The College of William & Mary was founded on February 8, 1693. Named in honor of the reigning monarchs King William III and Queen Mary II, the college was one of the original Colonial colleges. William & Mary was founded as an Anglican institution; governors were required to be members of the Church of England, and professors were required to declare adherence to the Thirty-Nine Articles.

The Reverend Mr Blair, who had been serving as Rector of Henrico Parish (then along the western frontier), was very aware of the fate of Henricus and the first attempt at a college there, both of which had been annihilated in the Indian massacre of 1622. The peaceful situation with the Native Americans and the high ground and central location in the developed portion of the colony at Middle Plantation must have appealed to him, for he is credited with selecting a site for the new college on the outskirt of the tiny community. Blair and the trustees of the College of William and Mary bought a parcel of 330 acres (1.3 km^{2}) from Thomas Ballard for the new school. The new school opened in temporary buildings in 1694. Properly called the "College Building", the first version of the Wren Building was built at Middle Plantation beginning on August 8, 1695 and occupied by 1700. (Today, the Wren Building is the oldest academic structure in continuous use in America).

The State House at Jamestown burned again (for the third time) in 1698, and as it had in the past, the legislature again took up temporary quarters at Middle Plantation. On May 1, 1699, Blair and five students of the College of William and Mary appeared before the House of Burgesses (which was meeting nearby in temporary quarters) to suggest that they designate Middle Plantation (soon to be renamed Williamsburg in honor of King William III), as the new capital of Virginia, and a month later, the legislators agreed.

Following its designation as the Capital of the Colony, immediate provision was made for construction of a capitol building and for platting the new city according to the survey of Theodorick Bland. Bruton Parish Church held a prominent location in the new plan.

Thus, by 1699, Bruton Parish Church found itself located adjacent to both the new college and the new capital of the colony. During the colonial period, all those in public office were required to attend church. Government and College officials in the capital city of Williamsburg therefore would have attended Bruton Parish Church. The influx of students, the governor and his entourage, and the legislature, as well as townspeople overwhelmed the small church.

The church and Williamsburg were each central to the life and government of the colony, As the court church of colonial Virginia, Bruton Parish Church soon took on appropriate trappings such as an altar cloth and cushion.

=== 1715: a new church building ===
Historians from Colonial Williamsburg Foundation have noted that the brick church stood near the center of Williamsburg's original survey map drawn 15 years after it was built. The layout may have been designed at least partially around the extant church, suggesting the church's importance to the colonial community's life. The brick church was, however, in poor condition and deemed inadequate for its prominent role.

In 1706, the vestry began considering building a larger church. With only 110 families in 1724, the parish vestry could, however, only afford to plan a small church, and invited the colony's government to finance an enlargement to accommodate the needs not arising from the local residents. Four years later the General Assembly agreed to fund pews for the governor, council, and burgesses. Royal Governor Alexander Spotswood drafted plans for the structure: a cruciform church (the first in Virginia) 75 feet (23 m) long, 28 feet (8.5 m) wide, with 19-foot (5.8 m) long transepts (wings).

Under the watchful eye of Dr. James Blair, who was rector from 1710 to 1743 (and also president of William and Mary from 1693 until his death), the construction of the new church got underway, with the first construction contract awarded in 1711. Finished in 1715, the church soon had all the required furnishings: Bible, prayer books, altar, font, cushions, surplice, bell, and reredos tablets.

In 1755 the church got its first organ when the vestry voted on November 18 to enable "a person to build a Loft for an Organ in the Church in the City of Williamsburg, and to set up the same." Peter Pelham was unanimously chosen as the church's first organist.

Shortly after, the parish established the Bruton Parish Poorhouse.

=== American Revolution, decline ===
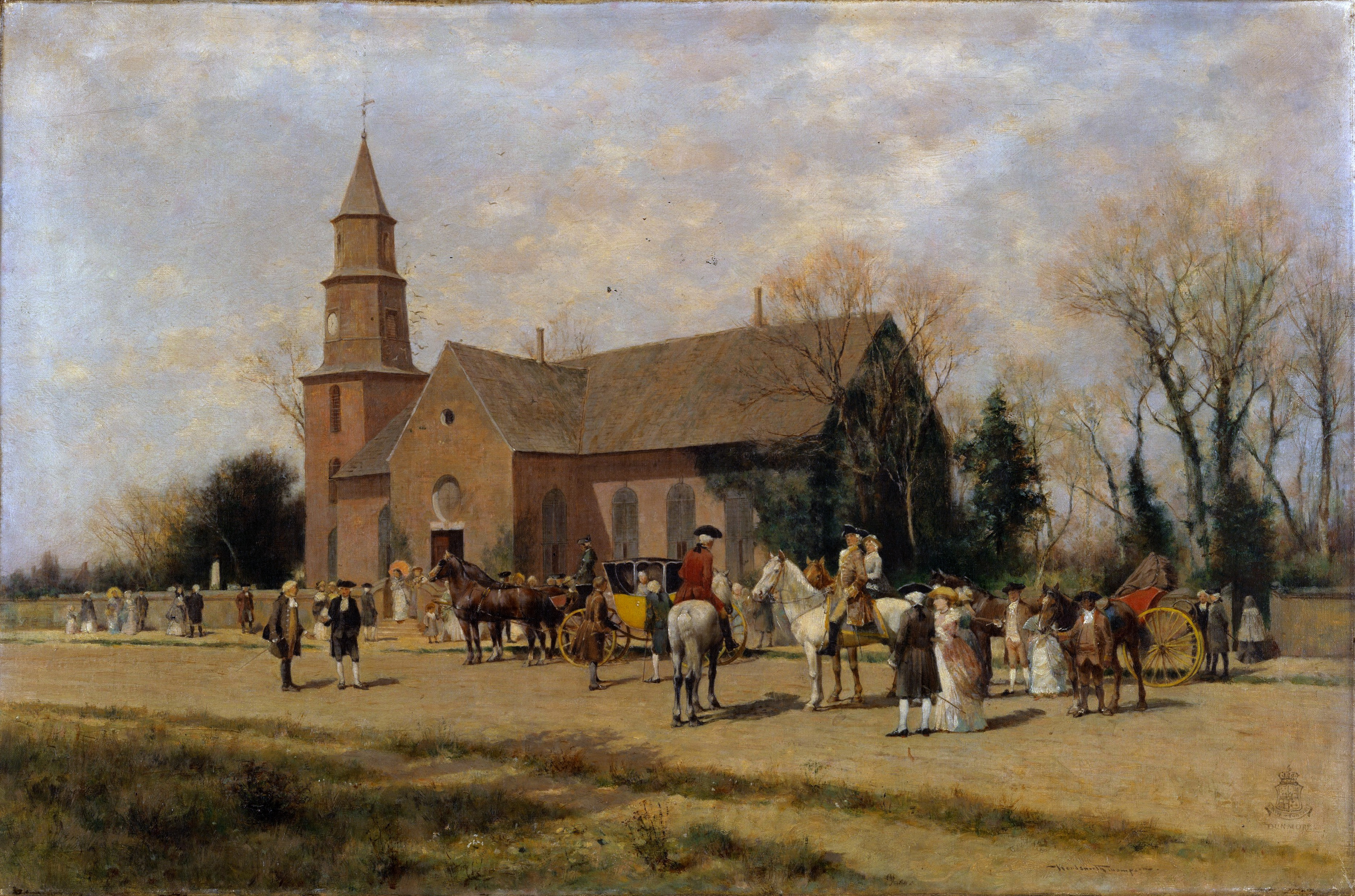
Bruton Parish in the mid-1770s

As the American Revolutionary War began in 1776, the power of both the monarchy and the church as an institution controlled by the government came into question in the colony. Among the Virginia leaders of the time who attended Bruton Parish Church were Thomas Jefferson, George Washington, Richard Henry Lee, George Wythe, Patrick Henry, and George Mason.

The capital was relocated to Richmond in 1781 for greater security in the conflict with Great Britain, and when the new Constitution of the United States and the accompanying Bill of Rights were adopted, the concepts of Separation of Church and State and Freedom of Religion changed the role of Bruton Parish Church in its community. With the end of colonial rule, Bruton Parish Church declined just as the city did. Among notables buried in the cemetery are Cyrus Griffin, John Blair, and Edmund Pendleton

However, the church grew anew as part of the Episcopal Church in the United States of America, which became the first autonomous Anglican province outside the British Isles. In the new Commonwealth of Virginia, those attending Bruton Parish Church did so by choice, and the parish survived to modern times, where it is still active. Over the years, various changes were made to the church fabric, including reversing the interior to place the altar at the west, instead of the east, end. In the early 20th century, an important restoration took place.

=== Revitalization of Colonial Williamsburg ===
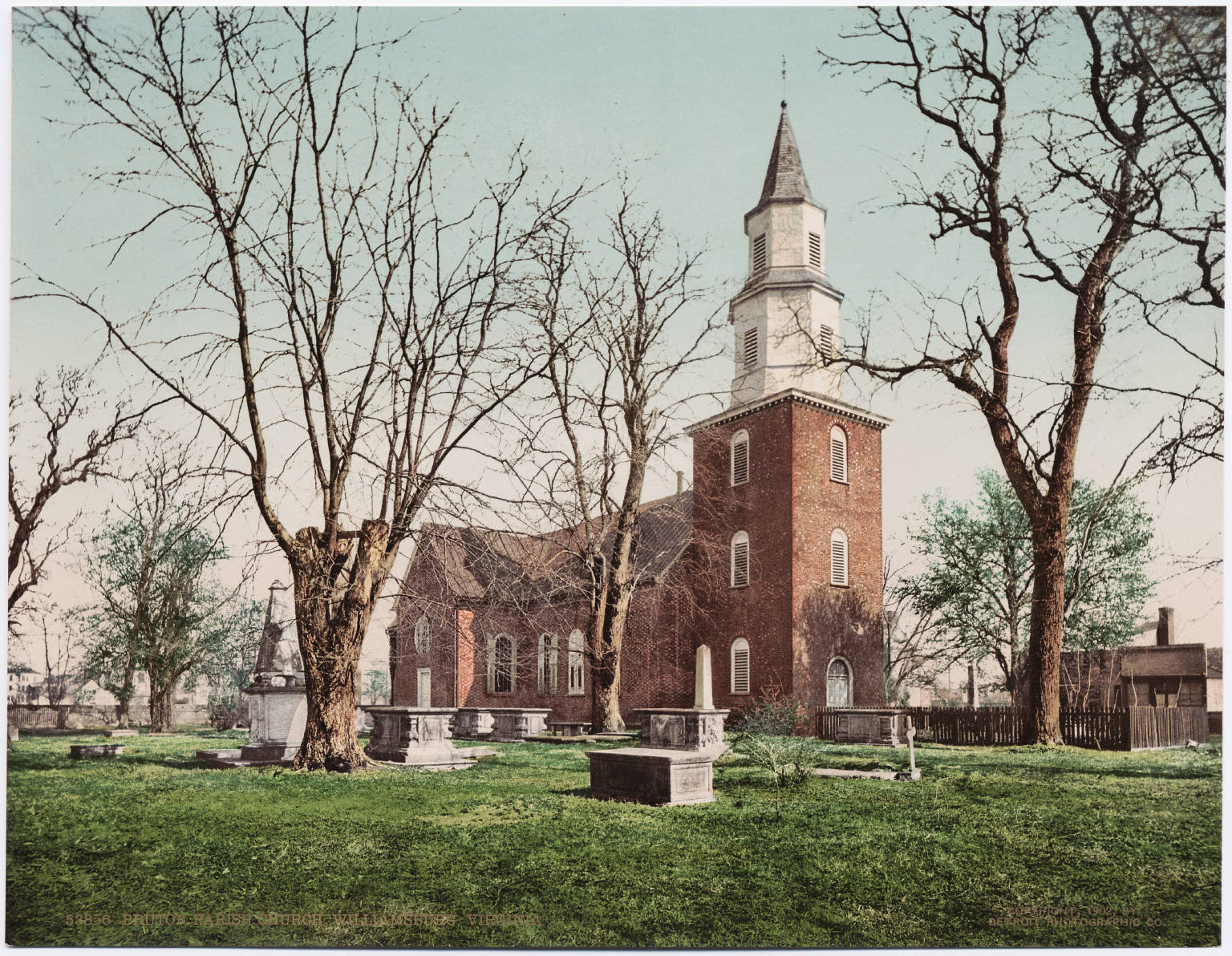
View of Bruton Parish Church, ca. 1902

The revitalization of Bruton Parish Church came about largely through the efforts of its rector, the Reverend Dr W.A.R. Goodwin (1869–1939), who came to the parish in 1903. He was inspired by his historic parish with its many surviving 18th-century buildings. Dr Goodwin oversaw fund-raising, preservation and restoration of the aged and historic church building, using information gathered from town and church records. The restoration of the interior of Bruton Parish Church to its colonial form and appearance was inaugurated by a service held on May 14, 1905, with a sermon on the Continuity of the Life of the Church, by Rev. Beverley Dandridge Tucker, D.D. The church's restoration was completed by 1907, in time to mark the 300th anniversary of the establishment of the Episcopal Church in America. The work turned out to be only the first part of a much larger restoration.

Dr Goodwin was called to Rochester, New York, where he stayed until 1923, when he returned to Virginia, to teach at the College of William and Mary, and serve again at Bruton Parish. He was shocked at the continued deterioration of many other historic buildings in the immediate vicinity of the church and the college. He feared they would be completely destroyed as time went on. In 1924, Dr Goodwin started a movement to preserve the buildings in the district. As his primary source of funding, Dr Goodwin was fortunate in this effort to sign on John D. Rockefeller Jr., the wealthy son of the founder of Standard Oil, and his wife Abby Aldrich Rockefeller. He stimulated their interest in the old city and helped that grow into the incredible generosity that financed the restoration. Together, through their personal efforts and diligence, and funding from the Rockefeller Foundation, Abby and John Rockefeller worked with Dr Goodwin and others to make the remarkable dream of restoring the old colonial capital come true.

=== Search for "Bacon's Vault" ===
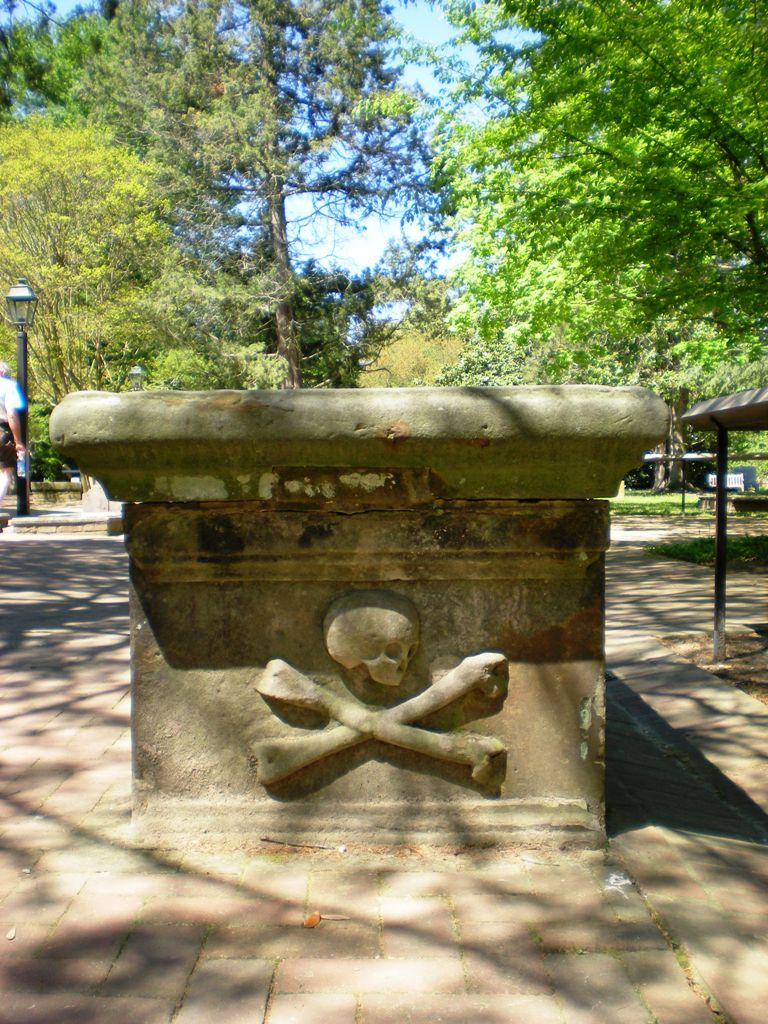
Burial at the church

In 1938 Marie Bauer, a follower and the future wife of prominent mystic Manly P. Hall, claimed to have deciphered information hidden in George Wither's 1635 book A Collection of Emblemes, Ancient and Moderne that under the foundations of the first brick church at Bruton Parish was a secret vault containing lost writings by Sir Francis Bacon, including proof that Bacon was the true author of Shakespeare's plays and plans for a utopian society. Bauer received permission from the parish to conduct an excavation, and using coordinates she reportedly decoded from various tombstones on the grounds, uncovered the foundations of the original 1683 brick church. The excavation was halted after digging to a depth of about nine feet for fear of desecrating the graves in the churchyard. Bauer then hired an engineering firm to conduct metal-detecting tests on the site, which concluded that "At a depth of from sixteen to twenty feet square…lies a body partially filled and much larger than an ordinary tomb."

Interest in the supposed vault was rekindled in 1985 after radar tests indicated possible disturbed soil beneath the site of the 1938 dig. Following the arrest of three people caught digging on the church grounds in the middle of the night, the Colonial Williamsburg Foundation conducted a new excavation in the summer of 1992. Following Bauer's original calculations, archeologists dug to a depth of twenty feet without locating any evidence of a vault. A geologist from the College of William & Mary took several soil samples and concluded that the ground at that depth had lain undisturbed for three million years.

== The Church today ==
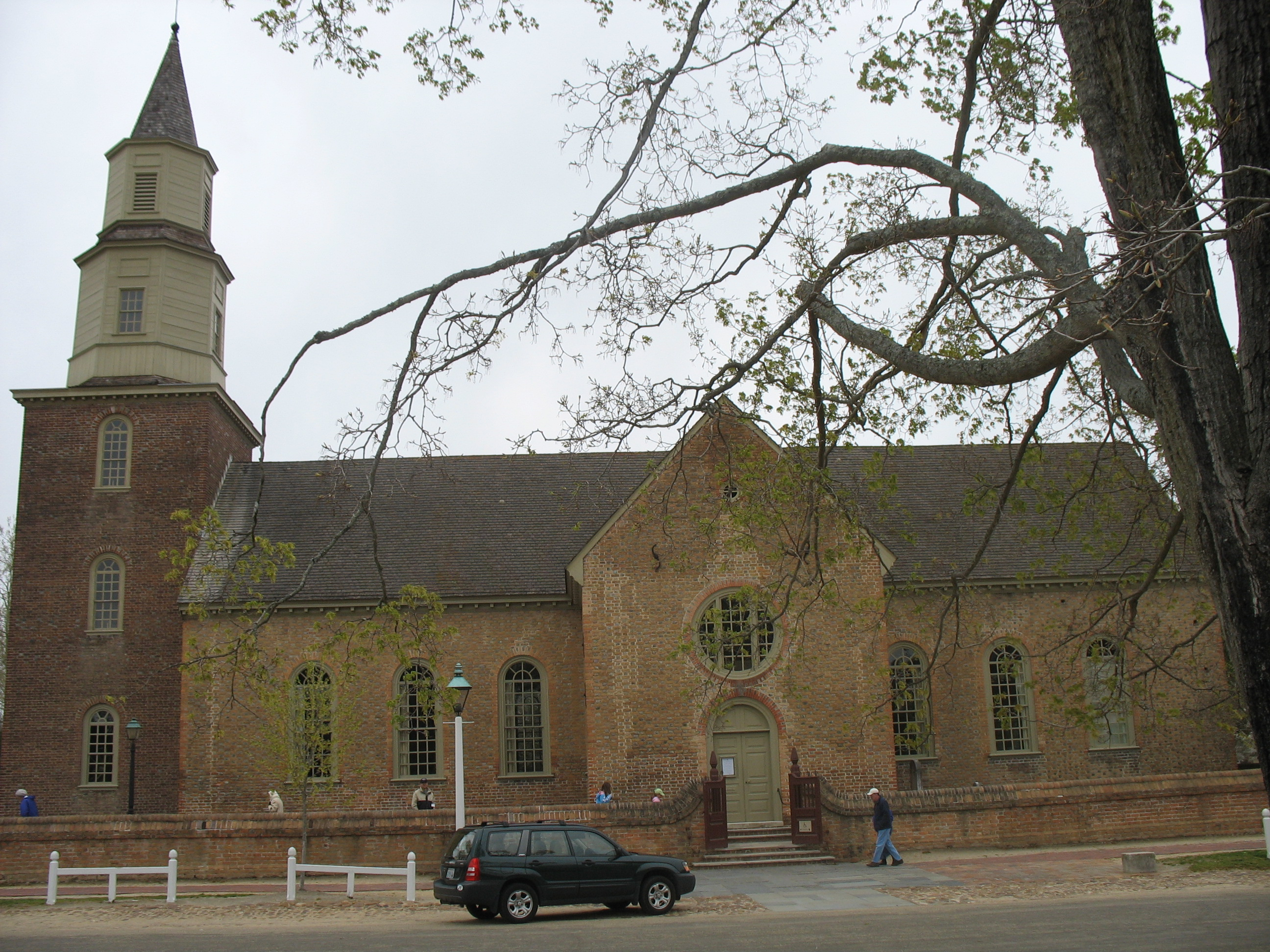
Bruton Parish Church today

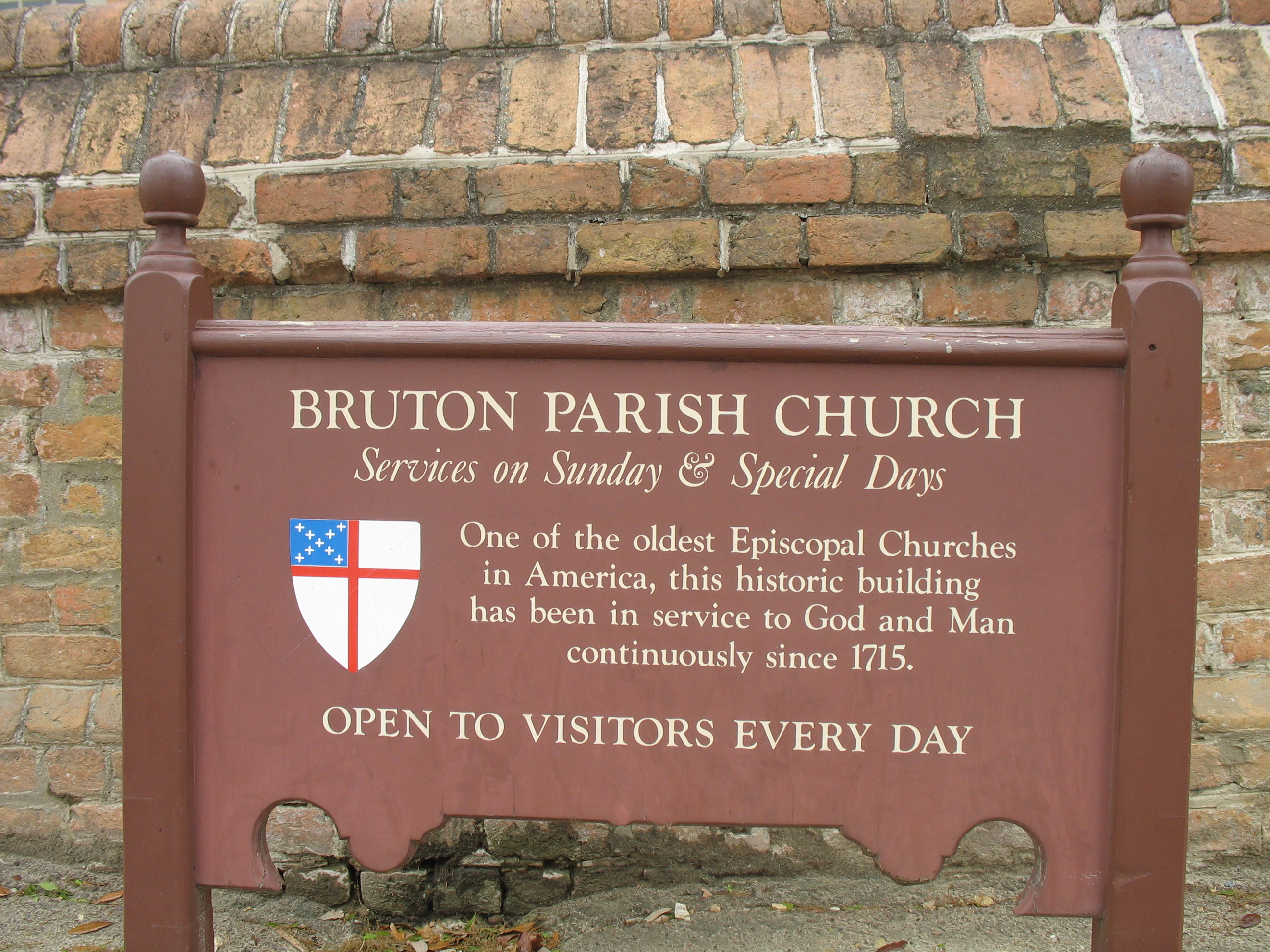
The sign in front of Bruton Parish Church

Today, Colonial Williamsburg’s Historic Area encompasses 301 acres (1.22 km^{2}) and includes 89 original 18th-century buildings, along with hundreds of authentic reconstructions, restorations, and structures with a historically-accurate appearance. It is joined by the Colonial Parkway to the two other sides of the Historic Triangle, Jamestown and Yorktown. At Jamestown, England established its first permanent colony in the Americas, and at Yorktown the Continental Army under George Washington won a decisive victory to end British rule.

Bruton Parish Church today is the most active parish in the Episcopal Diocese of Southern Virginia. It has nearly two thousand members, four regular Sunday services, and active youth and college organizations. The Church has been restored to its appearance during the colonial era, and name plates on its box pews commemorate famous worshippers from the time, including George Washington, James Madison, John Tyler, Benjamin Harrison, Patrick Henry, and Thomas Jefferson. The church still uses a bell cast in 1761, which rang to celebrate the signing of the Declaration of Independence in 1776 and the signing of the Treaty of Paris in 1783 which marked the end of the American Revolutionary War.

The bell in the tower is engraved: "The Gift of James Tarpley to Bruton Parish, 1761." In 1766 it rang to celebrate repeal of the Stamp Act. On May 15, it celebrated the passing of a resolution by the House of Burgesses to establish a State Constitution and Declaration of Rights, and to instruct the Virginia Delegates in Congress to offer a resolution to declare the united Colonies free and independent states. In 1783, it sounded to celebrate the ratification of the Treaty of Peace between the United States and Great Britain."

And, much as the former country parish found a new role with the influx of persons visiting the new College and colonial capital in the 18th century, visitors to Colonial Williamsburg are welcomed to join locals, including students, college staff, and community leaders in worshiping there.

=== Music program ===
Bruton Parish Church has a rich tradition of music, dating back to 1755. While in the early days the only music allowed would have been a prelude and postlude (instrumental music before and after the service) and the responsive chanting of psalms, the church has had an organ since 1755. Because of the ban on music, this was highly unusual, but since the church was in the capital city and had a number of high class congrengants, the organ was deemed necessary. Peter Pelham was the first organist, and began the tradition of Candlelight Concerts by allowing locals to come in and listen while he gave lessons to promising students.

The current music program, led by Rebecca Davy and JanEl Will, carries on the traditions started by Pelham while keeping up with modern trends in worship. The two primary choirs, the Pelham and Chancel choirs, sing in the morning services and at special concerts such as the John D. Rockefeller Jr memorial concert. In addition to the two choirs, there are also a college student choir that sings at an evening service, two children's choirs that sing on occasion during services, an orchestra that plays for the choir concerts, and a handbell choir that plays during services and at special concerts. The church continues the tradition of candlelight concerts with guest choirs, guest organists, and instrumentalists on Tuesday, Thursday, and Saturday nights as well as special monthly Evensong services featuring guest choirs.

In January 2011, the church decided to take Peter Pelham's tradition of instructing students to a new level and create the position of organ scholar. The first organ scholar was Allen T. Blehl of Oradell, New Jersey. Blehl studied organ since he was 13, and continued his studies at the College of William and Mary under instructor Thomas Marshall in addition to performing services and concerts at Bruton Parish Church. In 2014, following Blehl's graduation from William and Mary, Carina Sturdy became the new organ scholar.

== See also ==
- List of National Historic Landmarks in Virginia
- National Register of Historic Places listings in Williamsburg, Virginia
- List of burial places of justices of the Supreme Court of the United States
