= Peter Pelham (composer) =

Peter Pelham (9 December 1721 – 28 April 1805) was an English-born American organist, harpsichordist, teacher and composer.

Pelham was born in London. His father, also named Peter Pelham, was an engraver and an artist. Around 1730 the Pelhams immigrated to Boston, where the father apprenticed his son to Charles Theodore Pachelbel son of Johann . Pachelbel. The latter left for Charleston, South Carolina in 1736 and Pelham followed him. He remained in Charleston for some time, studying with Pachelbel and later becoming a harpsichord teacher himself. In 1744 Pelham became first organist of Trinity Church in Boston. Around 1750 he moved to Williamsburg, Virginia, where in 1755 he became organist of Bruton Parish Church. He held that post for almost 50 years, until 1802. Pelham actively participated in the city's musical life, giving concerts and conducting. He also supported himself and his family by running a small music store, as well as engaging in some non-musical activities: he was supervisor for the printing of currency from 1758 to 1775 and superintended the Public Gaol from 1770 to 1780. In 1802 Pelham became blind. His daughter Elizabeth succeeded him for a brief period as organist of Bruton Church. Pelham died in Richmond, Virginia. Although several collections he compiled of music by other composers are extant, almost none of his own music survives, save for a short harpsichord minuet. He helped popularize the music of Vivaldi, Handel and Haydn in Boston.
