= Yorktown Wrecks =

Archaeological site in Virginia, United States

- U.S. National Register of Historic Places
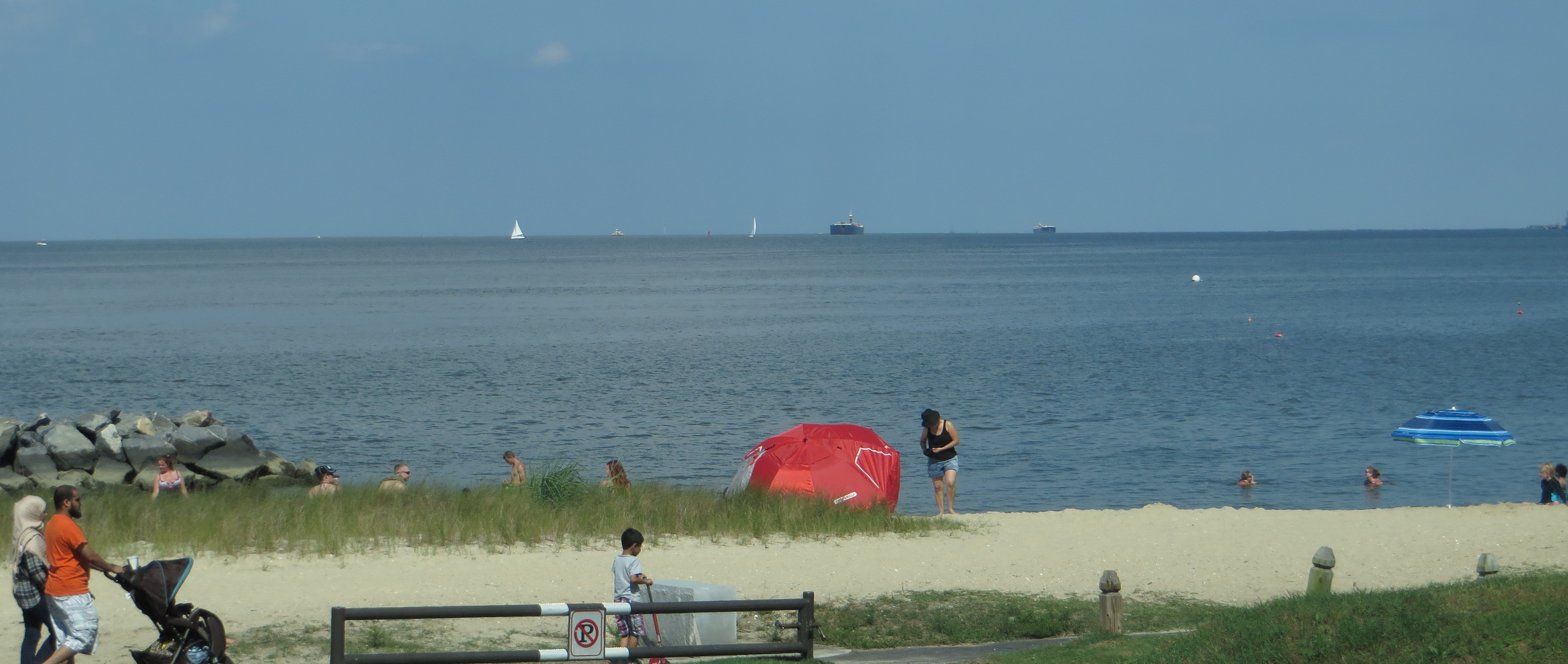
- The York River at Yorktown
- Nearest city: Yorktown, Virginia
- Area: 3,550 acres (1,440 ha)
- Built: 1781
- Built by: Multiple
- Architectural style: Frigate;Fifth rater
- NRHP reference No.: 73002069
- Added to NRHP: October 9, 1973

The Yorktown Wrecks is an expansive archaeologically sensitive area of Virginia's York River, in whose waters significant naval remnants of the American Revolutionary War are located. As a result of surveys conducted in the 1970s, at least ten sunken vessels sunken or scuttled around the time of the 1781 Siege of Yorktown have been identified. In the days preceding the siege, American and French naval forces sank a number of British vessels off Yorktown, and General Charles Cornwallis ordered the scuttling of other ships. At the end of the siege and the British surrender, at least twenty-six British vessels were unaccounted for, and are believed to lie in the York River.

The site was listed on the National Register of Historic Places in 1973; it was the first underwater listing on the register.

== See also ==
- National Register of Historic Places listings in York County, Virginia
