= Skiffes Creek Sand Spit Site =

Archaeological site in Virginia, United States

- U.S. National Register of Historic Places
- Virginia Landmarks Register
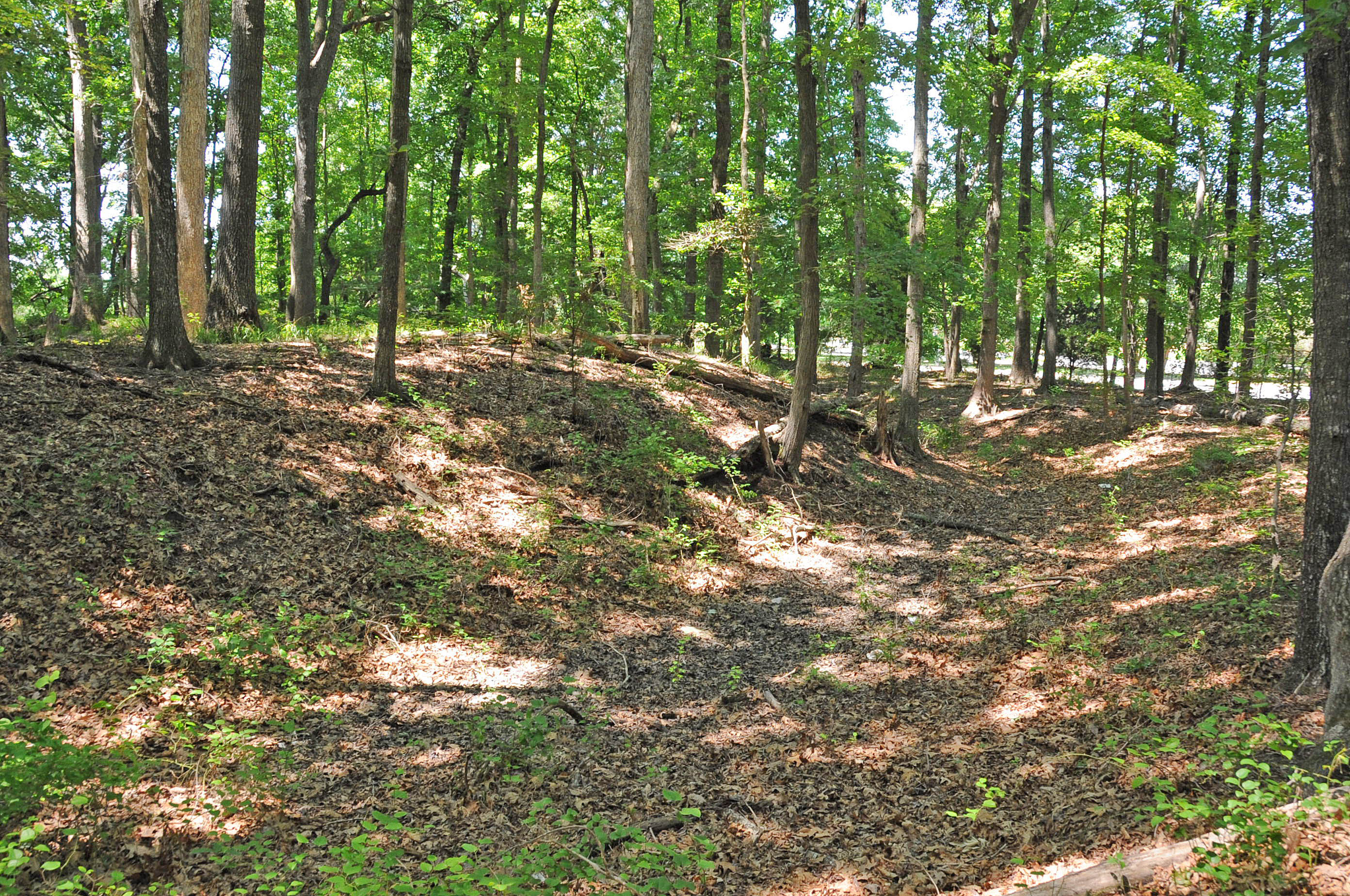
- Location: Address Restricted, Newport News, Virginia
- Area: 0.1 acres (0.040 ha)
- MPS: Oakland Farm Industrial Park MRA
- NRHP reference No.: 83003295
- VLR No.: 121-0041

Significant dates
- Added to NRHP: February 24, 1983
- Designated VLR: September 16, 1982

Skiffes Creek Sand Spit Site is a historic archaeological site located at Newport News, Virginia. It is a well-preserved, possibly stratified archaeological site containing evidence of prehistoric habitation dating to the Early and Middle Woodland eras. The site is invaluable to documenting settlement patterning and environmental and cultural adaptation in Tidewater Virginia during the period 500 B.C. to A.D. 500.

It was listed on the National Register of Historic Places in 1983.
