= Smith's Pharmacy =

Historic commercial building

- U.S. National Register of Historic Places
- Virginia Landmarks Register
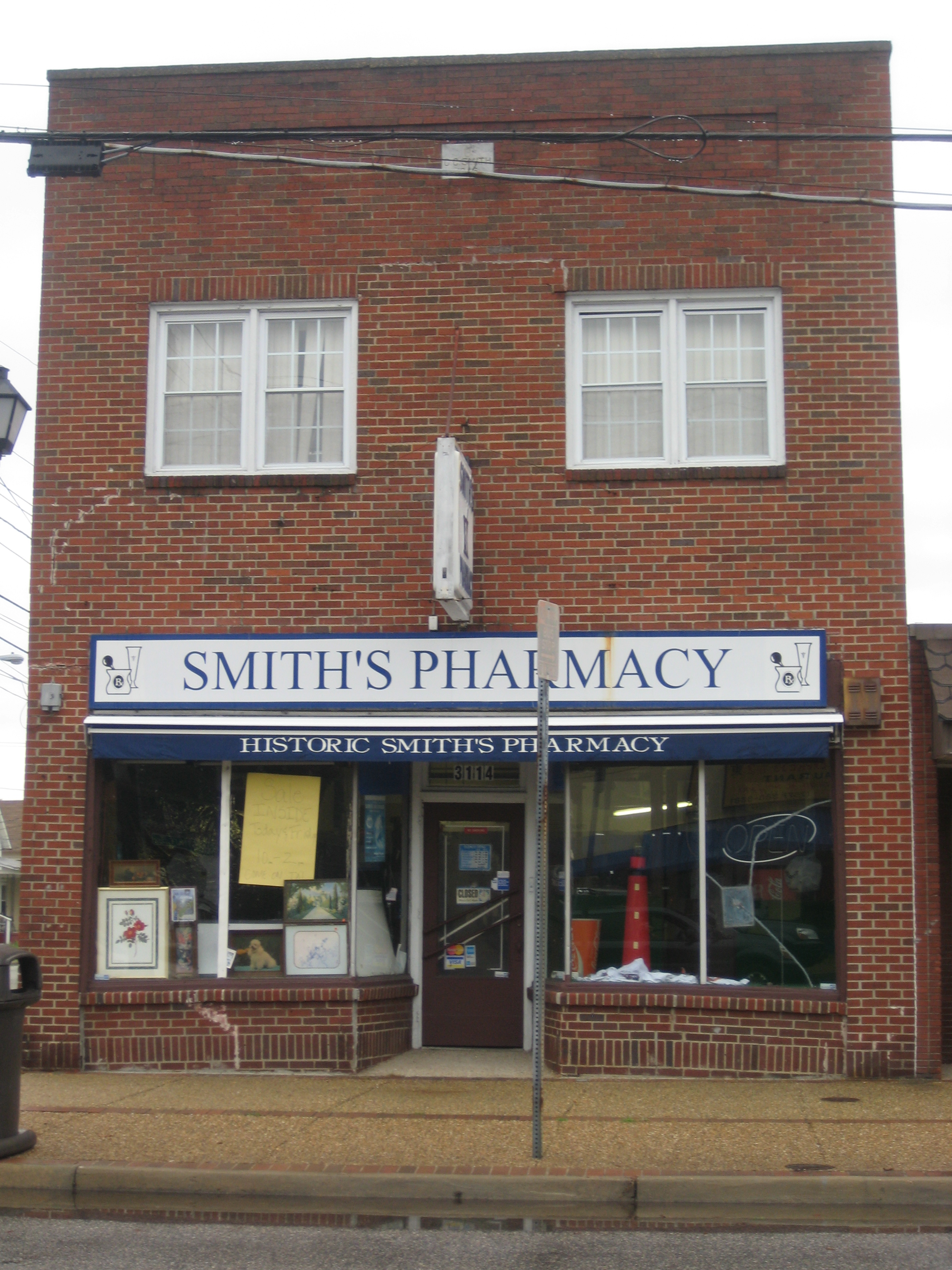
- Smith's Pharmacy, September 2012

- Location within Virginia Location within the United States
- Location: 3114 Chestnut Ave., Newport News, Virginia
- Coordinates: 36°59′35″N 76°24′33″W
- Area: less than one acre
- Built: 1946, 1952
- Architect: Livas, Henry L.; Walker, Elbert
- Architectural style: Early Commercial
- NRHP reference No.: 02000618
- VLR No.: 121-5066

Significant dates
- Added to NRHP: June 6, 2002
- Designated VLR: March 13, 2002

Smith's Pharmacy is a historic commercial building located in the East End section of Newport News, Virginia. It is a two-story brick building. The first floor was built in 1946 to house the pharmacy with the second floor being added in 1952 to serve as office space. The interior of the first floor remains virtually unaltered with the original pharmaceutical retail space, counters, soda fountain and wooden booths. It was the pharmacy of Dr. Charles Calvin Smith, an African-American pharmacist who established the store to serve that community in Newport News. He opened the first black owned pharmacy in Newport News in 1921. The Smith's Pharmacy was sold to the Eckerd Corporation in 1999.

It was listed on the National Register of Historic Places in 2002.
