= Noland Company Building =

Historic commercial building in Virginia, United States

- U.S. National Register of Historic Places
- Virginia Landmarks Register
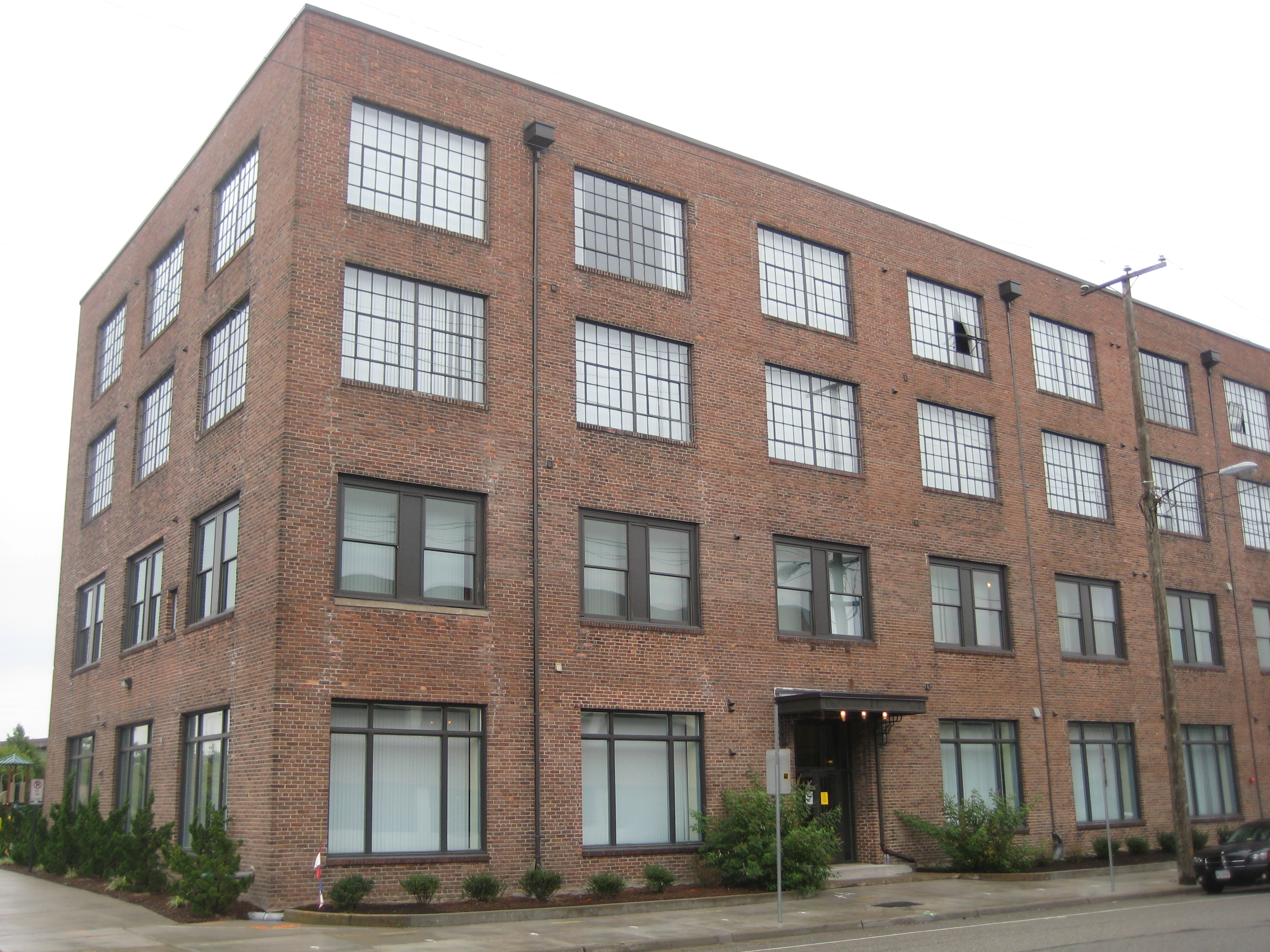
- Noland Company Building, September 2012

- Location within Virginia Location within the United States
- Location: 2600 Warwick Blvd., Newport News, Virginia
- Coordinates: 36°58′56″N 76°25′36″W
- Area: less than one acre
- Built: 1920, 1938
- Architectural style: Late 19th And Early 20th Century American Movements
- NRHP reference No.: 10000283
- VLR No.: 121-0299

Significant dates
- Added to NRHP: May 21, 2010
- Designated VLR: March 18, 2010

Noland Company Building is a historic building located at Newport News, Virginia. The original section was built in 1920, and is three stories in height and is a cast-in-place concrete and brick structure. Later additions are a four-story brick addition and two-story brick addition parallel to the four-story section to create a "U" shape. The building took its present form by 1938. It features large industrial-sized windows that provide light in both the three- and four-story sections. Until 1996, the building served as headquarters for the Noland Company, a wholesale distributor of plumbing, heating, air conditioning, refrigeration, electrical, and industrial supplies.

It was listed on the National Register of Historic Places in 2010.
