= James A. Fields House =

Historic house in Virginia, US

- U.S. National Register of Historic Places
- Virginia Landmarks Register
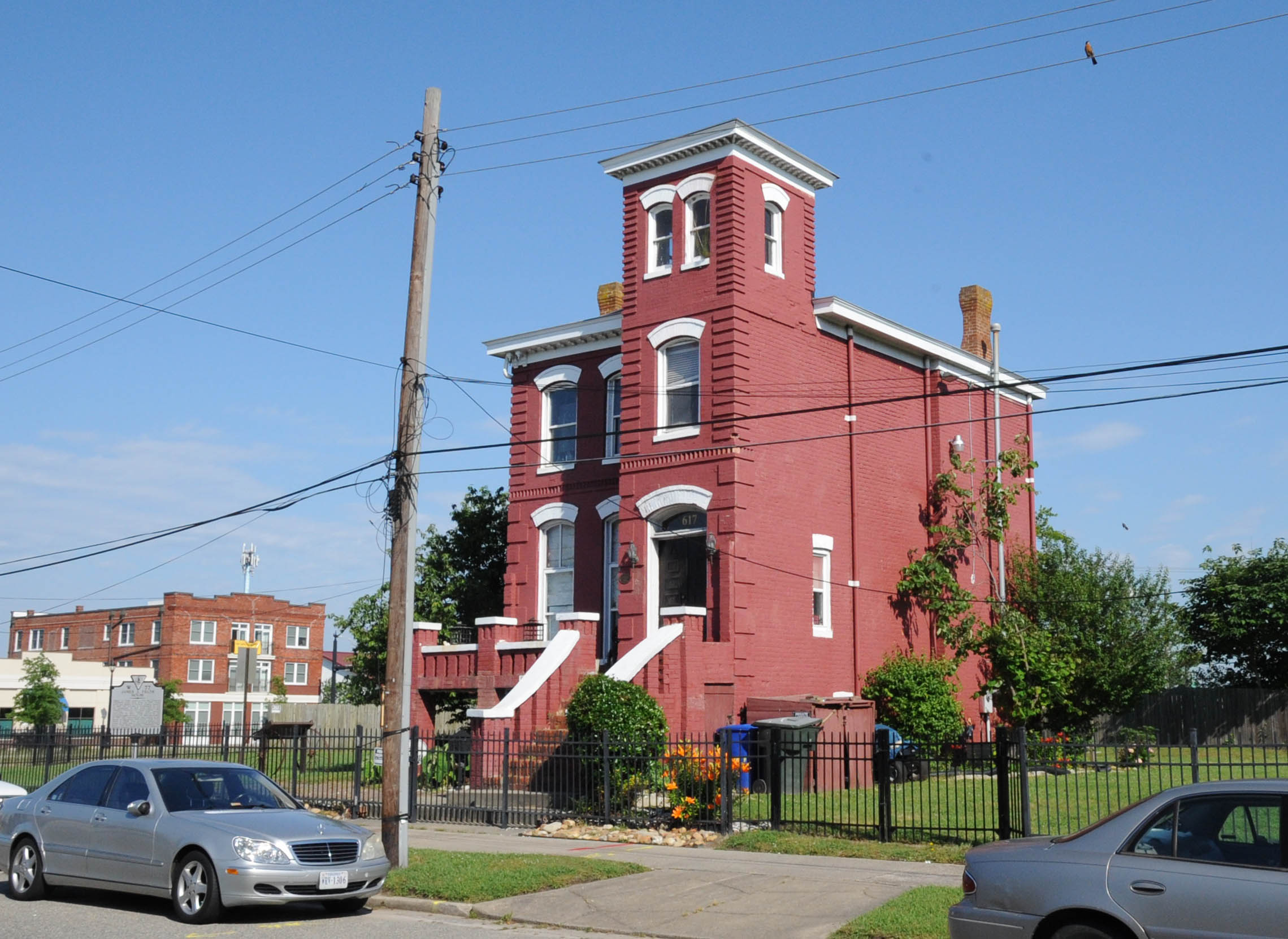

- Location within Virginia Location within the United States
- Location: 617 27th St., Newport News, Virginia
- Coordinates: 36°59′5″N 76°25′19″W
- Area: less than one acre
- Built: 1897
- Architectural style: Italianate
- NRHP reference No.: 02000623
- VLR No.: 121-5004

Significant dates
- Added to NRHP: June 6, 2002
- Designated VLR: March 13, 2002

James A. Fields House is a historic home located in the Brookville Heights neighborhood in the East End of Newport News, Virginia. It was built in 1897, and is a two-story, Italianate style red brick dwelling on a raised basement. It features an entrance tower with a low pitched hipped roof and two ten-foot tall two-over-two windows on the first floor. It was built by the prominent African-American lawyer and politician James A. Fields (1844–1903) and served as the location of the first black hospital in the city, which later became the Whittaker Memorial Hospital.

It was listed on the National Register of Historic Places in 2002.
