= William Gooch Tomb and York Village Archeological Site =

Archaeological site in Virginia, United States

- U.S. National Register of Historic Places
- Virginia Landmarks Register
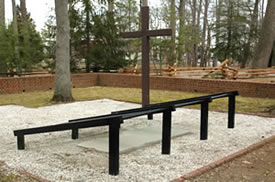
- Gravestone of William Gooch
- Nearest city: Yorktown, Virginia
- Area: 4 acres (1.6 ha)
- Built: 1655
- Architect: Multiple
- NRHP reference No.: 74002153; 99000074 (decrease)
- VLR No.: 099-0060

Significant dates
- Added to NRHP: January 18, 1974
- Boundary decrease: February 11, 1999
- Designated VLR: October 16, 1973, June 17, 1998

William Gooch Tomb and York Village Archeological Site is a historic archaeological site located near Yorktown, York County, Virginia. It is the site of York Village established on the York River near Wormley Creek before 1635. A church was constructed at York about 1638. In 1655, Maj. William Gooch, uncle of Sir William Gooch, 1st Baronet, was buried within the church walls. His armorial slab is one of the oldest interpretable tombstones in Virginia. The village was abandoned by the end of the 18th century. The site is located on the U.S. Coast Guard Reserve Training Center and marked by a small park.

It was added to the National Register of Historic Places in 1974.
