= Bruton Parish Poorhouse Archeological Site =

Archaeological site in Virginia, United States

- U.S. National Register of Historic Places
- Virginia Landmarks Register
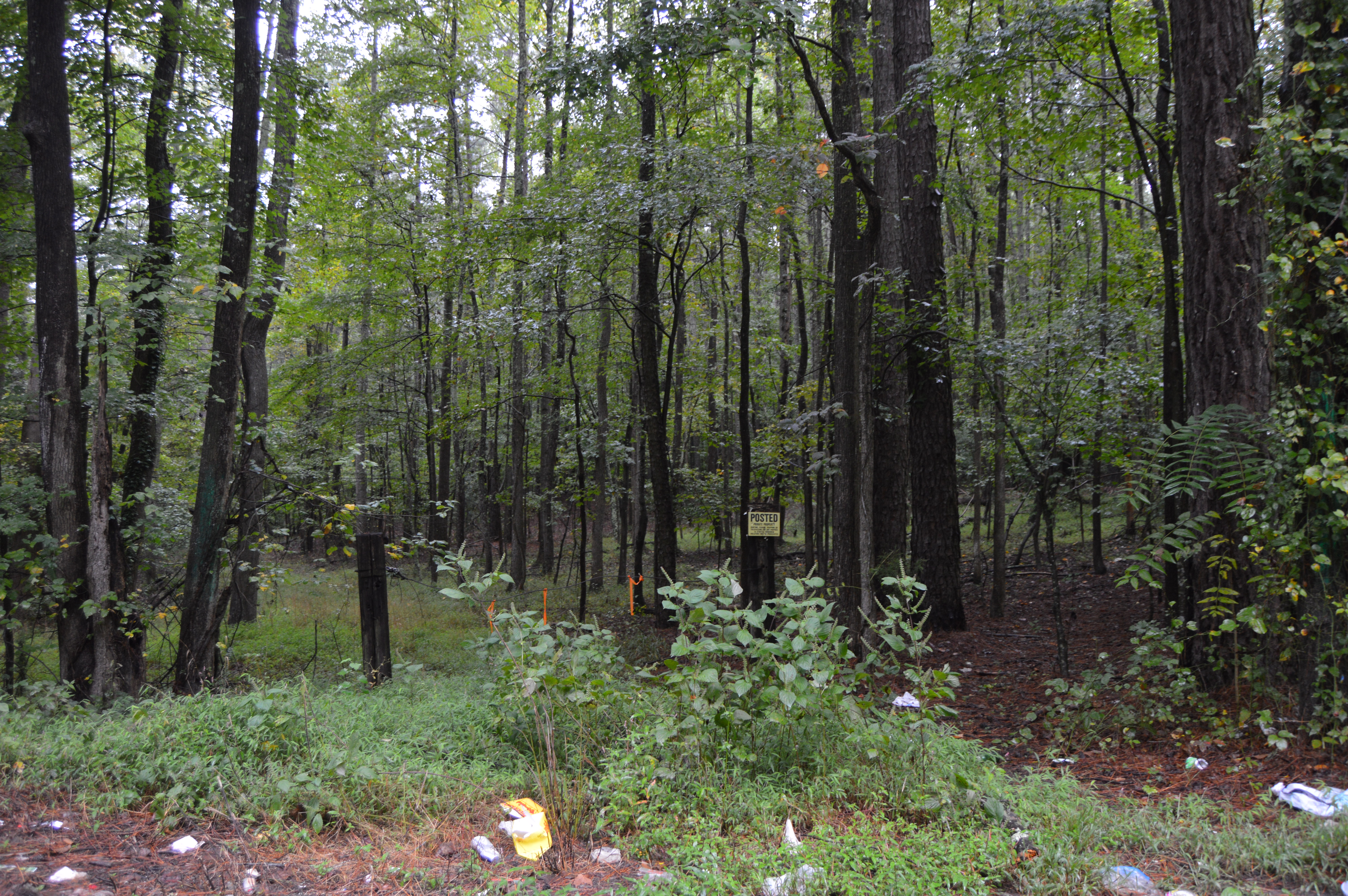
- Southern side of the site
- Nearest city: Williamsburg, Virginia
- Area: 2 acres (0.81 ha)
- Built: 1755
- NRHP reference No.: 82004610
- VLR No.: 099-0070

Significant dates
- Added to NRHP: September 2, 1982
- Designated VLR: November 18, 1980

Bruton Parish Poorhouse Archeological Site is a historic archaeological site located near Williamsburg, York County, Virginia. It is the site of a poorhouse established by Bruton Parish Church after a 1755 act of the assembly empowering all the colony's parishes to erect poorhouses. An excavation in 1978 by the Virginia Department of Historic Resources revealed the foundations of one of four poorhouse buildings identified by the French cartographer Desandrouin in 1781–1782.

It was added to the National Register of Historic Places in 1982.
