= Whittaker Memorial Hospital =

Hospital in Newport News, Virginia, United States

- U.S. National Register of Historic Places
- Virginia Landmarks Register
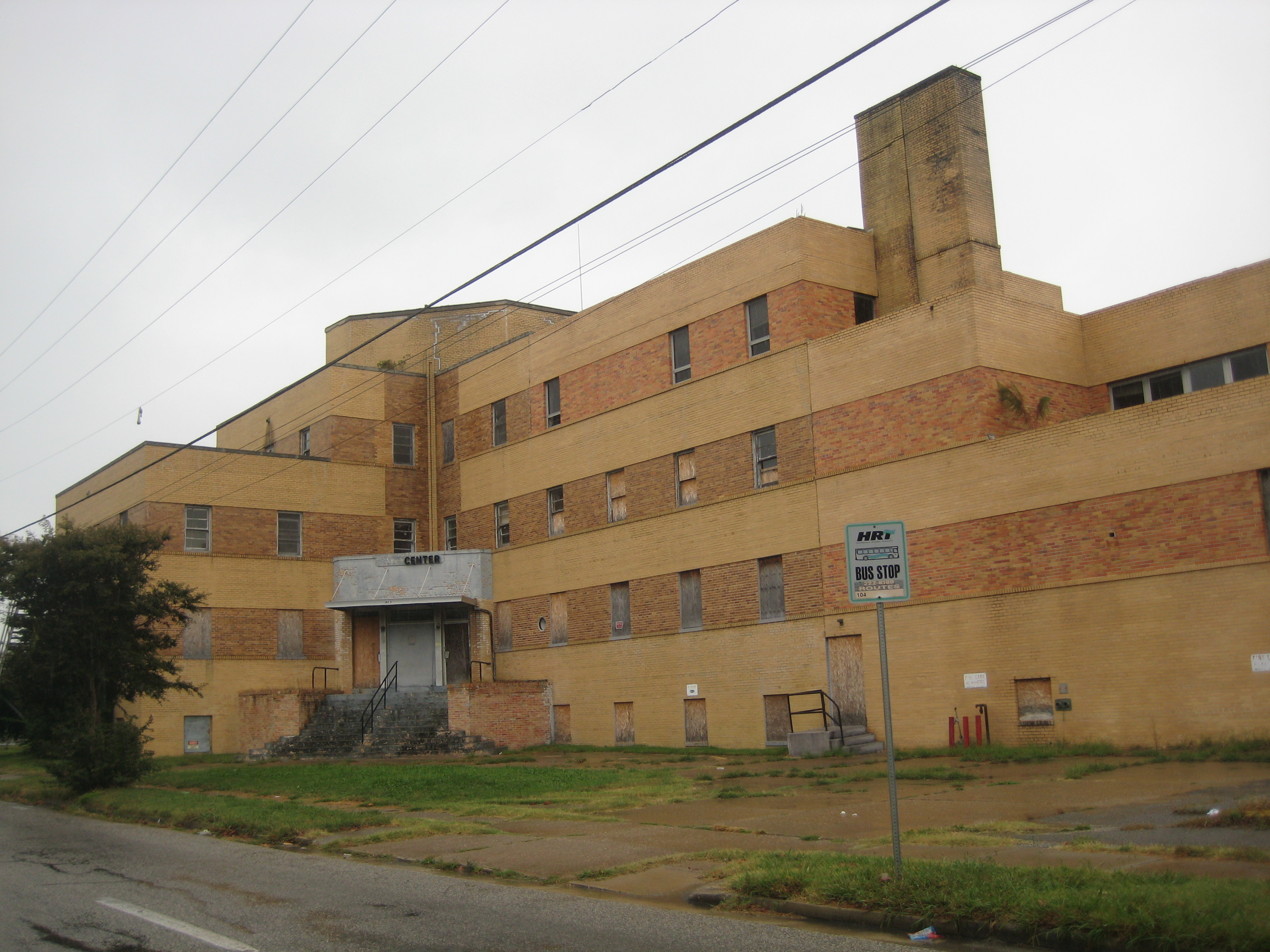
- Whittaker Memorial Hospital, September 2012

- Location within Virginia Location within the United States
- Location: 1003 Twenty-Eighth St., Newport News, Virginia
- Coordinates: 36°59′22″N 76°24′45″W
- Area: less than one acre
- Built: 1943
- Architect: Moses, William Henry; et al.
- Architectural style: Modern Movement
- NRHP reference No.: 09000794
- VLR No.: 121-5072

Significant dates
- Added to NRHP: September 30, 2009
- Designated VLR: June 18, 2009

Whittaker Memorial Hospital is a historic hospital building located in the Brookville Heights neighborhood in the East End of Newport News, Virginia. The original section was built in 1943 with additions in 1957 and 1966. It was listed on the National Register of Historic Places in 2009.

== History ==
The earliest portion of the building has a symmetrical "T"-plan with both Moderne and Art Deco influences. It has a concrete frame, with concrete roof and floor slabs, and curtain walls constructed of alternating bands of yellow and brown bricks. The central mass is three stories tall and has two-story wings. The Whittaker Memorial Hospital was founded in 1908 to serve the African-American population of Newport News. The hospital was built by African-American physicians and designed by African-American architects, William Henry Moses Jr. and Charles Thaddeus Russell.

It was originally housed in the James A. Fields House, then in a frame hospital built in 1915 before this building was constructed in 1943. The hospital closed in 1985.
