= History of Hampton Roads =

Regional history in Virginia, US

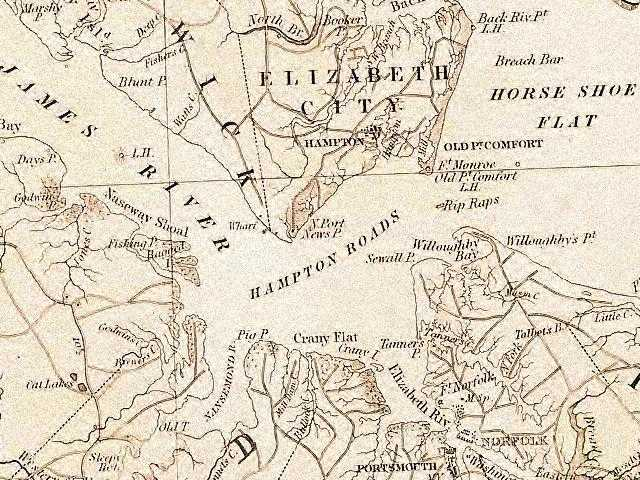
The harbor area of Hampton Roads, from official state map of pre-civil war Virginia circa 1858.

The Hampton Roads region of Virginia, United States, has a history of human habitation prior to European colonization. The Jamestown Colony was established in the region in 1607, with several conflicts fought in the region.

== Colonial era ==
=== 1607: the English colonists chose Jamestown ===
The first colonists arrived in 1607 when English Captain Christopher Newport's three ships, his flagship Susan Constant, the smaller Godspeed, and even smaller Discovery landed in April 1607 at Cape Henry along the Atlantic Coast in today's City of Virginia Beach, an event now known as the "First Landing." However, they moved on, under orders from the Virginia Company of London, the crews and new colonists sought a more sheltered area up one of the rivers. Their major concern was other European competitors such as the Spanish, who had earlier discovered the Chesapeake Bay and Virginia's rivers, and had even in 1570 begun a small settlement on the Virginia Peninsula known as the Ajacán Mission, which had failed.

During 18 days of exploring the area, they surely saw the enormous harbor of Hampton Roads, and some of the party must have appreciated its possibilities. However, after exploring the James River west at least as far as present-day Hopewell, they agreed upon Jamestown Island, where they established the first English speaking settlement to survive in the New World on 14 May 1607.

The site was deep enough water for ships to dock but was also easily defendable. But despite the defensive advantages of that location against Spanish attacks, the low and marshy site at Jamestown proved a very poor choice in many other ways. More than five years of fragile existence, disease-carrying insects and high mortality rates followed including the Starving Time of 1609-10 when over 80% of the 500 colonists perished before the future of the Virginia Colony began to appear more promising. The change came about with the just-in-time arrival of a new Governor, Lord Delaware, and a new colonist with a successful business idea named John Rolfe, who pioneered farming tobacco as a highly profitable cash crop.

=== Values of the harbor: commerce, military control ===
For centuries, the harbor and rivers of Hampton Roads have been ideal locations for both commerce and for many major shipyards. Some were established as early as the late 17th century such as the Gosport Navy Yard in what is now the City of Portsmouth.

The harbor was also a key point for military control of the region. Even the earliest settlers created fortifications at Old Point Comfort by 1610 against potential attacks by ships of Spanish or other unfriendly European forces.

=== American Revolutionary War ===
Important conflicts of the American Revolutionary War involved Norfolk and Craney Island (at the mouth of the Elizabeth River in Portsmouth). It was at Norfolk where the last Royal Governor of the Virginia Colony, Lord Dunmore, departed mainland Virginia for the last time.

== 19th Century ==
=== War of 1812 ===
The first naval action of the War of 1812 took place on 8 July 1812, when the Bermuda sloop, HMS Whiting, its crew oblivious to the US declaration of war, lowered anchor in Hampton Roads. As its captain was being rowed ashore, the Royal Naval vessel was seized by the American privateer Dash, which happened to be leaving port.

=== Federal improvements ===
Under the new United States government, by the 1830s, the entrance from Chesapeake Bay was defended by Fort Monroe, built by the U.S. Army beginning in 1819 on Old Point Comfort, and by Fort Wool, built as Fort Calhoun in 1829, on a small island called the Rip Raps near the middle of the channel (and now adjacent to one of the manmade islands of the Hampton Roads Bridge-Tunnel). Much work in the building of these fortresses in the early 19th century was done by a 24-year-old engineer in the U.S. Army, a Lieutenant named Robert E. Lee

=== American Civil War, emancipation and education of former slaves ===
During the American Civil War (1861-1865), the famous Battle of Hampton Roads between the first American ironclad warships, the USS Monitor and the CSS Virginia (ex-USS Merrimack) took place off Sewell's Point, on March 8–9, 1862. That battle was inconclusive, but later in 1862, Union forces took control of Hampton Roads, Norfolk, and the lower James River. However, their efforts to take the Confederate capital of Richmond via the James River with their vastly superior Navy were thwarted by a strong Confederate battery position high above a bend in the river about 8 miles (13 km) below Richmond at Drewry's Bluff.

Fort Monroe was the launching place for Union General George McClellan's massive 1862 Peninsula Campaign, a land campaign of many months which began at Fort Monroe and advanced up the Virginia Peninsula, with a Siege at Yorktown and another battle at Williamsburg before the Union Army almost literally reached the gates of Richmond, ending at the Chickahominy River within earshot of the city's church bells, according to the journals of Union soldiers. However, the Confederates mounted a credible defense of their capital city, and McClellan's campaign failed to capture Richmond, ending in the Seven Days Battles, during which the Union Army withdrew, effectively extending the War for almost three more years.

On February 3, 1865, as the Confederacy was near total collapse, President Abraham Lincoln met with three senior Confederates in an effort to negotiate for peace (the "Hampton Roads Conference"). Lincoln wanted the states to return to the Union and indicated the Union would pay for the slaves. The Confederates insisted their demand was complete independence, so the 4-hour conference ended in failure.

Beginning in 1861, some of the former slaves found refuge near Fort Monroe, which remained in Union hands throughout the War. There, the commander, Union Army General Benjamin F. Butler, a lawyer by training, declared them to be "Contraband of war". On that legal basis, Union forces refused to return them to Confederate owners as would have been the practice even in many "free states" before Virginia seceded and declared itself a foreign power. Soon, word spread, and many slaves were understandably anxious to become "contraband."

Although many of the "contraband" men at Hampton and elsewhere during the War volunteered and became part of the United States Colored Troops (USCT), others and the women and children grew in increasing numbers near Fort Monroe in Elizabeth City County. From the wood and materials salvaged from the remains of the Town of Hampton, which had been burned earlier by retreating Confederates, they built the Grand Contraband Camp, near, but outside the protective walls of the Army base. It was the first self-contained African American community in the United States.

Close by, was (and still is) the Emancipation Oak, on the grounds of the school for them which grew to become Hampton University. Beginning as a normal school founded to train teachers, Hampton University was established by church groups and former Union Army officers. Early educators of the era included Mary Smith Peake and former Union Army General Samuel Chapman Armstrong, who was himself the son of missionaries, and had commanded a USCT force during the War. Among the earlier students was a young former slave named Booker T. Washington, who became a famed African-American educator and was the first head of present-day Tuskegee University. The Emancipation Oak is part of the official logo of the modern city of Hampton.

== Twentieth century ==
=== Sewell's Point: Jamestown Exposition and a Navy Base ===
The Jamestown Exposition for the 300th anniversary of the 1607 founding of Jamestown was held at Sewell's Point in a rural section of Norfolk County in 1907.

President Theodore Roosevelt arrived by water in the harbor of Hampton Roads, as did other notable persons such as Mark Twain and Henry Huttleston Rogers, who both arrived aboard the latter's steam yacht Kanawha. A major naval display was featured, and the U.S. Great White Fleet made an appearance. The leaders of the U.S. Navy apparently did not fail to note the ideal harbor conditions, as was later proved.

Beginning in 1917, as the United States became involved in World War I under President Woodrow Wilson, formerly rural Sewell's Point became the site of what grew to become the largest Naval Base in the world which was established by the United States Navy and is now known as the Naval Station Norfolk.

=== Military use of northern side of the Peninsula ===
Twice in the 20th century, families of mostly African American heritage were displaced in entire communities when land along the northern side of the Peninsula primarily in York County west of Yorktown was taken in large tracts for military use during World War I and World War II, creating the present-day U.S. Naval Weapons Station Yorktown, which includes Cheatham Annex, and a former Seabee base which became Camp Peary.

Communities including "the Reservation", Halstead's Point, Penniman, Bigler's Mill, and Magruder were all absorbed into the large military bases.

Although some left the area entirely, many of the displaced families chose to relocate nearby to Grove, an unincorporated town in southeastern James City County where many generations of some of those families now reside. From a population estimated at only 37 in 1895, Grove had grown to an estimated 1,100 families by the end of the 20th century. (To its north, Grove actually borders the Naval Weapons Station property and on its extreme east, a portion of the U.S. Army's land at Fort Eustis extends across Skiffe's Creek, although there is no direct access to either base).

=== Colonial Williamsburg ===
A dream of one Episcopalian priest to save his 18th century church building was to expand to create the world's largest living museum. Replacing Jamestown and the end of the 17th century, Williamsburg had been capital of the Colony and the new State of Virginia from 1699-1780. After the capital moved to Richmond in 1780, Williamsburg became a quieter and sometimes described as "sleepy" small town. It saw some action during the Battle of Williamsburg of the 1862 Peninsula Campaign during the Civil War. However, it was not located along any major waterway and did not have railroad access until 1881. Perhaps due to the secure inland location originally known as Middle Plantation, for Williamsburg, growth and great expansion of commerce in the 19th century did not occur as rapidly as in many other Virginia cities. The main activities were the College of William and Mary and Eastern State Hospital, each historic institutions in their own right. In addition to the city's historic past, quite a few buildings of antiquity from the 18th century were still extant, although time was taking a toll by the early 20th century.

The Reverend Dr. W.A.R. Goodwin of Bruton Parish Church initially had wanted merely to save his historic church building. This he accomplished by 1907. He later served in Rochester, New York for many years. Upon returning to Williamsburg in 1923, he began to realize that many of the other colonial-era buildings also remained, but were in deteriorating condition, and their continued longevity was at risk.

Goodwin dreamed of a much larger restoration along the lines of what he had accomplished with his historic church. A cleric of modest means, he sought support and financing from a number of sources before successfully drawing the interests and major financial support of Standard Oil heir and philanthropist John D. Rockefeller Jr. and his wife Abby Aldrich Rockefeller. The result of their combined efforts was the creation of Colonial Williamsburg, which included a restoration of the Wren Building at the College of William and Mary and a change of much of the downtown Williamsburg area into a 301-acre (1.2 km^{2}) Historic Area of restored and replica buildings and surrounds to celebrate the patriots and the early history of America.

By the 1930s, Colonial Williamsburg had become the centerpiece of the Historic Triangle of Colonial Virginia. These were, of course, Jamestown, where the colony started, Williamsburg, and Yorktown, where independence from Great Britain was won. The three points were joined by the U.S. National Park Service's Colonial Parkway, a remarkable accomplishment built over a period of 27 years. The Historic Triangle area of the Hampton Roads region became one of the largest tourist attractions in the entire world.

In Dr. Goodwin's words: "Williamsburg is Jamestown continued, and Yorktown is Williamsburg vindicated."

=== Other notable Hampton Roads "firsts" ===
In 1957, the Hampton Roads Bridge-Tunnel was the first bridge-tunnel complex in the world, to be followed by the area's much longer Chesapeake Bay Bridge-Tunnel in 1963.

In the 1960s, the first astronauts of Project Mercury trained at the NASA facility adjacent to Hampton's Langley Air Force Base. Local features including Mercury Boulevard commemorate this fact.

== Defunct shires, counties, cities, towns ==
As the current communities in the Hampton Roads region were formed and grew from the Colonial period to statehood and modern times, the political structure of many areas in Virginia changed. Between 1952 and 1976, a wave of consolidations of local governments led to almost the entire southeastern portion of Virginia consisting of a group of adjoining independent cities, eventually numbering eight. Joining the seven major cities of Hampton Roads was the comparatively tiny City of Poquoson, which had formerly been an incorporated town in York County).

Many incorporated (formally constituted) localities became legally defunct, though mostly not abandoned by their citizens, with the notable exception of Jamestown. For search of genealogical, land, and other historical records, it may be necessary to find these old names.

The following is a partial listing of defunct political subdivisions in the Hampton Roads area with approximate formation and dissolution dates. Note: Former towns which grew to become cities of the same name are not listed separately, nor are unincorporated towns. More information about dates and dispositions may be found in most individual articles by following the links.

In order of date founded:

- Jamestown, Virginia (1607) largely abandoned as a Town after 1699
- Kecoughtan, Virginia (1610), became part of Town and City of Hampton
- James Cittie (sic) (1619-1624)
- Elizabeth Cittie (sic) (1619-1624)
- Middle Plantation (1632-1699), (changed name to Williamsburg in 1699, chartered as city in 1722)
- Elizabeth River Shire (1634-1643)
- Warwick River Shire (1634-1643)
- Charles River Shire (1634-1643)
- James City Shire (1634-1643)
- Warrosquyoake Shire (1634-1637)
- New Norfolk County (1636-1637)
- Lower Norfolk County (1637-1691)
- Upper Norfolk County (1637-1646)
- Norfolk County, Virginia (1691-1963)
- Princess Anne County (1691-1963)
- Elizabeth City County (1643-1952)
- Nansemond County (1646-1972)
- Warwick County (aka Warwick River County) (1643-1952)
- City of South Norfolk (1922-1963)
- Town of Berkley incorporated town until 1906 when annexed by City of Norfolk
- Town of Phoebus(1900-1952) (earlier known as unincorporated towns of Millwood, Roseland Farms and Chesapeake City)
- City of Warwick (1952-1958)
- City of Nansemond (1972-1974)

== See also ==
- Timeline of Hampton, Virginia
- History of Norfolk, Virginia and Timeline
- History of Virginia Beach and Timeline
- History of Williamsburg, Virginia
