= History of Williamsburg, Virginia =

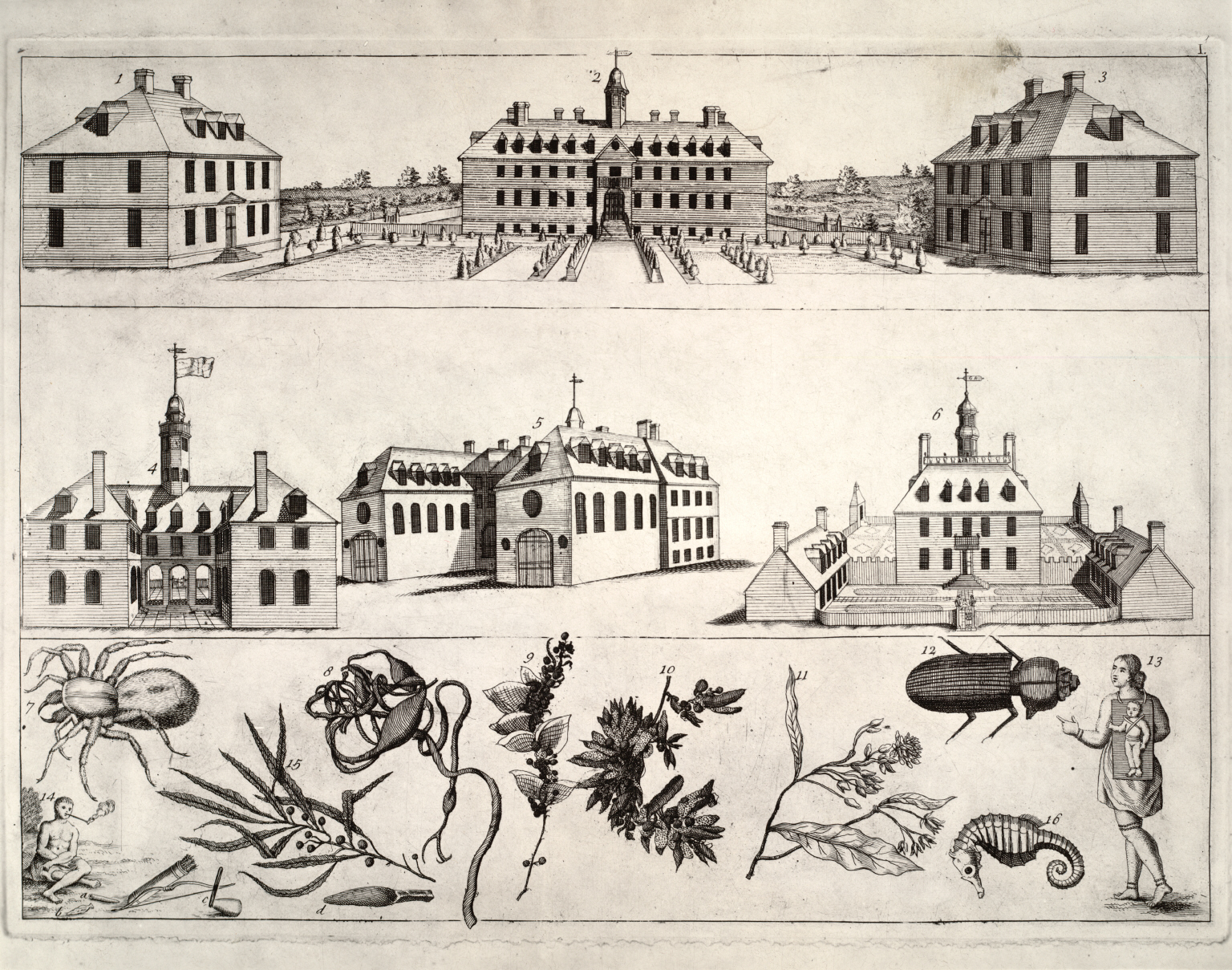
Print made with the Bodleian Plate. Engraved in the mid-18th century, it depicts various prominent structures in Williamsburg during its time as capital of Virginia: the College of William & Mary, the Capitol, and the Governor's Palace. Rediscovered in the 1920s in the Bodleian Library in Oxford, England, it was used in the restorations and reconstructions during the 20th Century.

The history of Williamsburg, Virginia dates to the 17th Century. First named Middle Plantation, it changed its name to Williamsburg in 1699.

== Seventeenth Century ==
Prior to the arrival of the English colonists at Jamestown in the Colony of Virginia in 1607, the area that became Williamsburg was largely wooded, and well within the territory of the Native American group known as the Powhatan Confederacy. In the early colonial period, navigable rivers were the equivalent of modern highways. For ease of travel, and security from conflicts with Native Americans, early colonial settlements were established close to rivers.

By the 1630s, English settlements had grown to dominate the lower (eastern) portion of the Virginia Peninsula. The Natives had abandoned their villages nearby, such as Kiskiack (also spelled "Chiskiack"), and settled in more remote locations, but continued to intermittently attack the colonists. To protect the lower peninsula's farming and fishing communities, the colonists built a stockade across the lake.

Lying along the center-line of the Virginia Peninsula, the area that became Williamsburg was some distance from both the James River and the York River, and the ground's elevation gradually decreased as it approached the shore of each. Near Williamsburg, College Creek and Queen's Creek fed into one of the two rivers. By anchoring each end on one of these two creeks, the land area was only about 6 miles (9.7 km) wide at that point, much less than at other locations.

The area that became Williamsburg was settled in 1638 and called Middle Plantation, for its location on the high ground about halfway across the peninsula. The cross-peninsula defensive palisade completed in 1634 was an integral part of the settlement's creation. Its exact route is unknown, but archaeologists recently discovered remnants of it on the Bruton Heights School property, adjacent to the site of the house of Governor John Page, while working on a Colonial Williamsburg archaeological research project.

Jamestown, originally the capital of Virginia Colony, remained as such until it burned down during the three events of Bacon's Rebellion in 1676. Immediately after Governor William Berkeley regained control, temporary quarters for the functions of the seat of government were established about 12 miles (19 km) away on the high ground at Middle Plantation while the Statehouse at Jamestown was rebuilt. The members of the House of Burgesses found the surroundings safer and more environmentally pleasant than Jamestown, which was muggy and plagued with mosquitoes.

A school of higher education was a long-held aspiration of the colonists. An early attempt at Henricus failed after the Indian massacre of 1622. The location at the outskirts of the developed part of the colony left it more vulnerable to the attack. In the 1690s, the colonists tried again and sent Reverend James Blair to England. After several years of lobbying, he obtained a royal charter for the new school, named the College of William and Mary in honor of the current monarchs. When Blair returned to Virginia, the new school was founded in a safe place, Middle Plantation, in 1693. Classes began in temporary quarters in 1694, and the College Building, a precursor to the Wren Building, was soon under construction.

Four years later, the rebuilt statehouse in Jamestown burned again (in 1698), this time accidentally. The government once again relocated temporarily to Middle Plantation, but now enjoyed use of the college's facilities in addition to the better climate. After the fire, the students of the college made a presentation to the House of Burgesses, and the colonial capital was permanently moved to Middle Plantation in 1699. A village was laid out, and Middle Plantation was renamed Williamsburg in honor of King William III of England, befitting the town's newly elevated status.

== Eighteenth Century ==
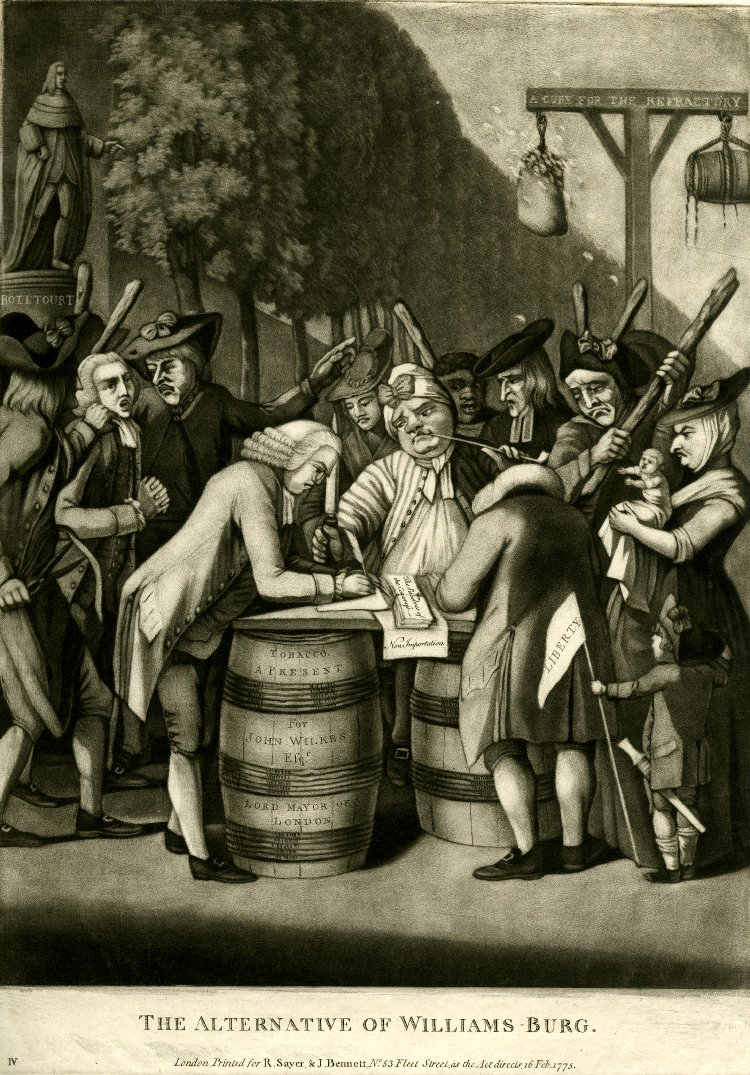
"The Alternative of Williamsburg", 1775

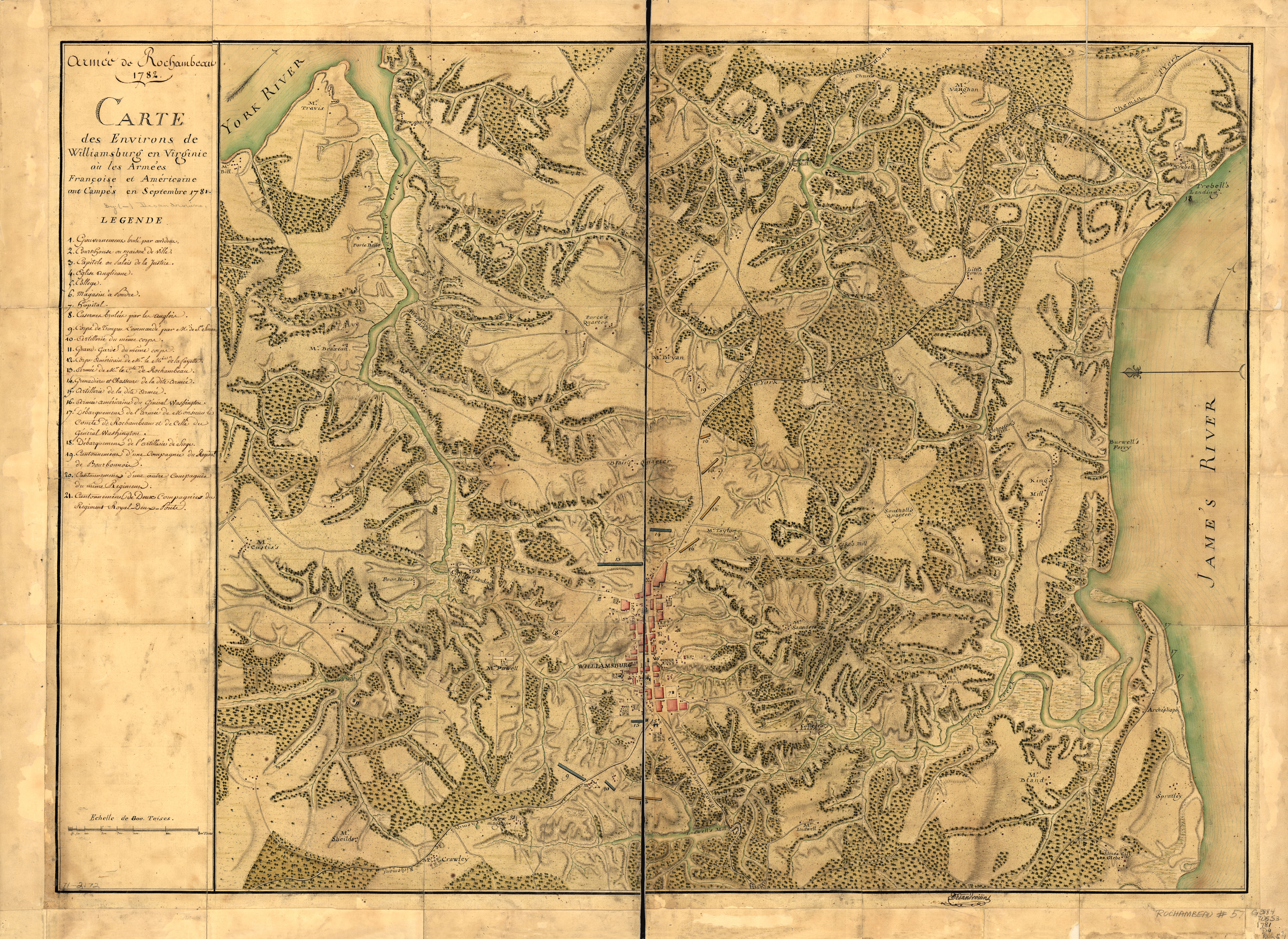
Map of Williamsburg from the American Revolutionary War

Following its designation as the Capital of the Colony, immediate provision was made for construction of a capitol building and for platting the new city according to the survey of Theodorick Bland.

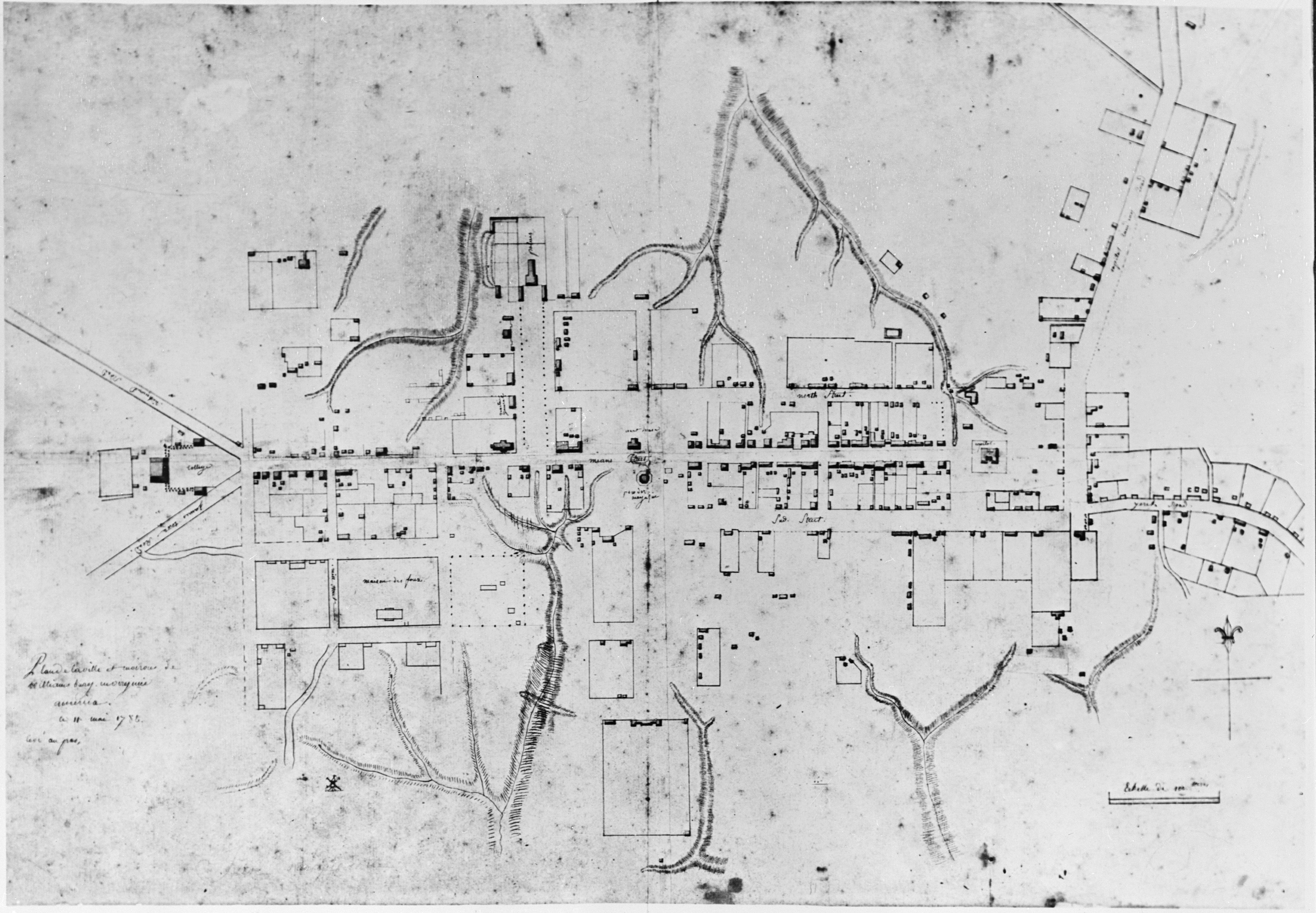
The "Frenchman's Map" showing Williamsburg as it appeared in 1782.

At the time the main street was rechristened after the Duke of Gloucester, it was a simple horse path that veered through a set of swampy ravines and was obstructed at one point by houses and an oven. On April 27, 1704, Francis Nicholson asked the House of Burgesses to allow purchase of four old homes on the site so they could be demolished. On May 5, Henry Cary and his workers tore the homes down, and gave the owner of the property, Col. John Page, £5 and let him have the bricks from the razed homes. The transaction may be the first documented condemnation proceeding in American history.

Alexander Spotswood, who arrived in Virginia as lieutenant governor in 1710, had several ravines filled and the streets leveled, and assisted in erecting additional college buildings, a church, and a magazine for the storage of arms. In 1722, the town of Williamsburg was granted a royal charter as a city, now believed to be the oldest in the United States.

Middle Plantation was included in James City Shire when it was established in 1634, as the Colony reached a total population of approximately 5,000. (James City Shire changed its name and became known as James City County). However, the middle ground ridge line was essentially the dividing line with Charles River Shire, which eventually became York County. As Williamsburg was developed, the boundaries were adjusted slightly, and for most of the colonial period, the border between the two counties ran down the center of Duke of Gloucester Street. During this time, and for almost 100 years after formation of the Commonwealth of Virginia and the United States, despite some practical complications, portions of the town were located in each of the two counties.

Williamsburg was the site of the first canal built in the United States. In 1771, Lord Dunmore, Virginia's Royal Governor, announced plans to connect Archer's Creek, which leads to the James River with Queen's Creek, leading to the York River. It would have been a water bridge across the Virginia Peninsula, but was not completed. Portions of the remains of this canal are visible at the rear of the grounds behind the Governor's Palace in Colonial Williamsburg.

The first psychiatric hospital in the United States was built in the city in the 1770s as the, "Public Hospital for Persons of Insane and Disordered Minds" (known in modern times as Eastern State Hospital), was established by act of the Virginia colonial legislature on June 4, 1770. The act, which intended to, "Make Provision for the Support and Maintenance of Ideots, Lunaticks, and other Persons of unsound Minds," authorized the House of Burgesses to appoint a fifteen-man Court Of Directors to oversee the future hospital's operations and admissions. In 1771, contractor Benjamin Powell constructed a two-story building on Francis Street near the college capable of housing twenty-four patients. The design of the grounds included "yards for patients to walk and take the Air in" as well as provisions for a fence to be built to keep the patients out of the nearby town.

Beginning in April 1775, the Gunpowder Incident, a dispute between Governor Dunmore and Virginia colonists over gunpowder (stored in the Williamsburg Magazine) evolved into an important event in the run-up to the American Revolution. Dunmore, fearing another rebellion, ordered royal marines to seize gunpowder from the magazine. Virginia militia led by Patrick Henry responded to the "theft" and marched on Williamsburg. A standoff ensued, with Dunmore threatening to destroy the city if attacked by the militia. The dispute was resolved when payment for the powder was arranged.

Following the Declaration of Independence, the American Revolutionary War broke out in 1776. During the War, in 1780, the capital of Virginia was moved again, this time to Richmond at the urging of then-Governor Thomas Jefferson, who was afraid that Williamsburg's location made it vulnerable to a British attack. However, during the Revolutionary War many important conventions were held in Williamsburg.

== Nineteenth Century ==
With the capital gone after 1780, Williamsburg also lost prominence, but not to the degree Jamestown had 81 years earlier. 18th and early 19th century transportation in the Colony was largely by canals and navigable rivers. Built deliberately on "high ground," Williamsburg was not located along a major waterway like many early communities in the United States. Early railroads beginning in the 1830s also did not come its way.

It seemed the principal business activities of Williamsburg had been the government and the college, the latter continuing and expanding, as well as the Public Hospital for Persons of Insane and Disordered Minds. Both the college and the Hospital grew, with the latter known in recent years as Eastern State Hospital.

=== American Civil War ===
At the outset of the American Civil War (1861–1865), enlistments in the Confederate Army depleted the student body of the College of William and Mary and on May 10, 1861, the faculty voted to close the college for the duration of the conflict. The College Building was used as a Confederate barracks and later as a hospital, first by Confederate, and later Union forces.

The Williamsburg area saw combat in the spring of 1862 during the Peninsula Campaign, an effort to take Richmond from the east from a base at Fort Monroe. Throughout late 1861 and early 1862, the small contingent of Confederate defenders was known as the Army of the Peninsula, and led by popular General John B. Magruder. He successfully used ruse tactics to bluff the invaders as to the size and strength of his forces, and intimidated them into a slow movement up the Peninsula, gaining valuable time defenses to be constructed for the Confederate capital at Richmond.

In early May, 1862, after holding the Union troops off for over a month, the defenders withdrew quietly from the Warwick Line (stretching across the Peninsula between Yorktown and Mulberry Island). As General George McClellan's Union forces crept up the Peninsula to pursue the retreating Confederate forces, a rear guard force led by General James Longstreet and supported by General J.E.B. Stuart's cavalry blocked their westward progression at the Williamsburg Line. This was a series of 14 redoubts east of town, with earthen Fort Magruder (also known as Redoubt # 6) at the crucial junction of the two major roads leading to Williamsburg from the east. The design and construction had been overseen by the College of William and Mary's President Benjamin S. Ewell, who owned a farm in James City County, and had been commissioned as an officer in the Confederate Army after the college closed in 1861.

At the Battle of Williamsburg on May 5, 1862, the defenders were successful in delaying the Union forces long enough for the retreating Confederates to reach the outer defenses of Richmond safely. A siege of Richmond resulted, culminating in the Seven Days Battles, and McClellan's campaign failed. As a result, the War dragged on almost 3 more years at great cost to lives and finances for both sides before its conclusion in April 1865.

On May 6, 1862, the city fell to the Union. The Brafferton building of the college was used for a time as quarters for the commanding officer of the Union garrison occupying the town. On September 9, 1862, drunken soldiers of the 5th Pennsylvania Cavalry set fire to the College Building, purportedly in an attempt to prevent Confederate snipers from using it for cover. Much damage was done to the community during the Union occupation, which lasted until September 1865.

=== Post Civil War ===
About 20 years later, in 1881, Collis P. Huntington's Chesapeake and Ohio Railway (C&O) built through the area, eventually establishing six stations in Williamsburg and the surrounding area. This aided passenger travel and shipping for local farmers, but the railroad had been built primarily for through-coal traffic destined for the coal pier and export at Newport News. Initially the tracks ran down Duke of Gloucester Street and through the grounds of the former Capitol at the eastern end. They were later relocated.

Of course, there were the ongoing activities of the College of William and Mary. However, school sessions there were temporarily suspended for financial reasons from 1882 until 1886, when the college became a state school.

Beginning in the 1890s, C&O land agent Carl M. Bergh, a Norwegian-American who had earlier farmed in the mid-western states, realized that the gentler climate of eastern Virginia and depressed post-Civil War land prices would be attractive to his fellow Scandinavians who were farming in other northern parts of the country. He began sending out notices, and selling land. Soon there was a substantial concentration of relocated Americans of Norwegian, Swedish, and Danish descent in the area. The location earlier known as Vaiden's Siding on the railroad just west of Williamsburg in James City County, was renamed Norge. These citizens and their descendants found the area conditions favorable as described by Bergh, and many became leading merchants, tradespersons, and farmers in the community. These transplanted Americans brought some new blood and enthusiasm to the old colonial capitol area.

== Restoration and Twenty-first Century ==
Williamsburg was still a sleepy little town in the early 20th century. Some newer structures were interspersed with colonial-era buildings, but the town was much less progressive than other busier communities of similar size in Virginia. Some local lore indicates that the residents were satisfied with it that way, and longtime Virginia Peninsula journalist, author and historian Parke S. Rouse Jr. has pointed this out in his published work. On June 26, 1912, the Richmond Times-Dispatch newspaper ran an editorial which dubbed the town "Lotusburg," for, "Tuesday was election day in Williamsburg but nobody remembered it. The clerk forgot to wake the electoral board, the electoral board could not arouse itself long enough to have the ballots printed, the candidates forgot they were running, the voters forgot they were alive."

However, even if such complacency was common, a dream of one Episcopalian priest was to expand to change Williamsburg's future and provide it a new major purpose, turning much of it into the world's largest living museum. In the early 20th century, one of the largest historic restorations ever undertaken anywhere in the world was championed by the Reverend Dr. W.A.R. Goodwin of Williamsburg's Bruton Parish Church. Initially, Dr. Goodwin had wanted to save his historic church building, and this he accomplished by 1907, in time for the 300th anniversary of the founding of the Episcopal Church in Virginia. However, upon returning to Williamsburg in 1923 after serving a number of years in upstate New York, he began to realize that many of the other colonial-era buildings also remained, but were in deteriorating condition, and their longevity was at risk.

Goodwin dreamed of a much larger restoration along the lines of what he had accomplished with his historic church. A cleric of modest means, he sought support and financing from a number of sources before successfully drawing the interests and major financial support of Standard Oil heir and philanthropist John D. Rockefeller Jr. and his wife Abby Aldrich Rockefeller. The result of their combined efforts was the creation of Colonial Williamsburg, which included a restoration of much of the downtown Williamsburg area with creation of a 301-acre (1.22 km^{2}) Historic Area to celebrate the patriots and the early history of America.

In the 21st century, Colonial Williamsburg has continued to update and refine its attractions, with more features designed to attract modern children and offer better and additional interpretation of the African-American experience in the colonial town. Just a little more after Dr. Goodwin's work began, the effort to maintain and improve this corner piece of Virginia and United States history remains a remarkable work-in-progress.

In addition to the Historic Area of Colonial Williamsburg, the city's railroad station was restored to become an intermodal passenger facility (see Transportation section below). Nearby in James City County, the old ca. 1908 C&O Railway combination passenger and freight station at Norge was preserved and after donation by CSX Transportation, was relocated in 2006 to property at the Croaker Branch of the Williamsburg Regional Library.

Today, Colonial Williamsburg is Virginia's best tourist attraction based upon attendance and forms the centerpiece of the Historic Triangle with Jamestown and Yorktown joined by the Colonial Parkway.

== Modern political involvement ==
Heads of state at the 1983 G7 summit

The third of three debates between Republican President Gerald Ford and Democratic challenger Jimmy Carter was held at Phi Beta Kappa Memorial Hall at the College of William and Mary on October 22, 1976. Perhaps in tribute to the debate's historic venue, as well as to the United States Bicentennial celebration, both candidates spoke of a "new spirit" in America.

The 9th G7 Summit was held in Williamsburg in 1983. The summit participants discussed the growing debt crisis, arms control and greater co-operation between the Soviet Union and the G7 (now the G8). At the end of the meeting, U.S. Secretary of State George P. Shultz read to the press a statement confirming the deployment of American Pershing II-nuclear rockets in West Germany later in 1983.
