= Queen's Creek =

Stream in York County, Virginia

Coordinates: 37°17′44″N 76°40′0.0″W

Queen's Creek is located in York County in the Virginia Peninsula area of the Hampton Roads region of southeastern Virginia in the United States. From a point of origin near the Waller Mill Reservoir in western York County, it flows northeasterly across the northern half of the Peninsula as a tributary of the York River.

== 17th century: anchoring the palisade ==
As Jamestown in the Colony of Virginia was first settled by English colonists beginning in 1607 along the James River, the colonists had frequent and violent confrontations with the Powhatan people who had long lived there. The two cultures had differing ideas of land use and the Powhatan hunting grounds and territory were encroached on by the increasing number of colonists. In addition, after 1612 they began to clear land and cultivate it for tobacco production, exacerbated by their cultivation of land-hungry tobacco as a cash crop to export after 1612.

Queen's Creek became important to the colony and was fortified in the 1630s. Colonists had discussed the idea of a palisade or fortification across the peninsula as early as 1611. But, colonist John Rolfe married Pocahontas, daughter of the chief Powhatan in 1614 and colonists enjoyed a period of relative peace with the Natives.

Following the uprising of the Powhatan and their Indian massacre of 1622, colonists revived the cross-peninsula palisade idea. In 1623, 73 settlers were slain in Martin's Hundred at Wolstenholme Towne, situated on the James about 6 miles (9.7 km) below Jamestown; the survivors temporarily abandoned the settlement. Governor Francis Wyatt and his Council wrote to the Earl of Southampton that they had under consideration a plan of "winning the forest" by running a pale between the James and York rivers.

Dr. John Potts blazed the way by obtaining on July 12, 1632, a patent for 1,200 acres (4.9 km^{2}) at the head of Archer's Hope Creek (later renamed College Creek), midway between the James River at Archer's Hope and the former Native American village of Chiskiack near the York River. On September 4, 1632, the General Assembly expanded the program of granting land to settlers of Chiskiack, and offered headrights land to all persons settling between Queen's Creek and Archer's Hope Creek.

In February 1633, the assembly voted to have men in "the compasse of the forest" east of Archer's Hope and Queen's Creek to Chesapeake Bay (essentially all of the lower peninsula) to go "before the first day of March next" to Dr. John Potts' plantation, "newlie built," to erect houses and secure the land in that quarter. Work on the palisade commenced by March 1, 1633.

With this labor, palisades, six miles (9.7 km) in length, were run from creek to creek. Queen's Creek drained the northern half of the nearby section of the Peninsula, with a watershed leading to the York River. The two creeks and the palisade in between created a barrier from river to river. At the high ridge at the midpoint, a settlement to be called Middle Plantation was made, later to be known as Williamsburg.

By 1634, the palisade (or stockade) was completed, providing some security from attacks by the Powhatan tribes for colonists farming and fishing lower on the Peninsula. The palisade was anchored at its center by Middle Plantation. It was described in the following extract from a letter written in 1634, from Jamestown, by Captain Thomas Yonge:

"a strong palisade ... upon a streight between both rivers and ... a sufficient force of men to defence of the same, whereby all the lower part of Virginia have a range for their cattle, near fortie miles in length and in most places twelve miles (19 km) broade. The pallisades is very neare six miles (9.7 km) long, bounded in by two large Creekes. ... in this manner to take also in all the grounde between those two Rivers, and so utterly excluded the Indians from thence; which work is conceived to be of extraordinary benefit to the country ..."

After 1644, Native Americans of the Powhatan Confederacy had been overcome and were no longer a threat. When the palisade fell into disrepair, it was not restored. Almost all traces eventually disappeared. Middle Plantation began to grow as a settlement, largely due to early efforts of the Ludwell brothers and Colonel John Page and his sons, who built fine brick homes and helped establish the brick Bruton Parish Church. The settlement became more prominent in the 1690s, when Reverend Dr. James Blair, Commissary of the Bishop of London in the colony, returned from a successful trip to London with a royal charter for the new College of William & Mary to be built there. Blair and the trustees of the College of William & Mary bought a parcel of 330 acres (1.3 km^{2}) from Thomas Ballard, the proprietor of Rich Neck Plantation, for the new school. This was on the western outskirts of Middle Plantation, just a short distance from the almost new brick Bruton Parish Church, a focal point of the extant community.

The new college opened in temporary buildings in 1694. Properly called the "College Building," the first version of the Wren Building was built at Middle Plantation beginning on August 8, 1695, and occupied by 1700. (The present-day College still stands upon those grounds, adjacent to and just west of the restored historic area known in modern times as Colonial Williamsburg).

After the statehouse at Jamestown burned in 1698, the legislature moved temporarily to Middle Plantation, as it had in the past. Upon suggestion of students of the college, the capital was permanently relocated there. Middle Plantation was renamed Williamsburg in 1699. Nearby, Archer's Hope Creek was renamed as College Creek.

== 19th century: another defensive line ==
In the mid-19th century, during the American Civil War, Queen's Creek and College Creek again served as parts of another cross-peninsula defensive barrier. The center section erected on land was located further east. Queen's Creek became the northern anchor of the Williamsburg Line. This was a series of 14 redoubts east of town, with earthen Fort Magruder (also known as Redoubt # 6) at the crucial junction of the two major roads leading to Williamsburg from the east. The design and construction had been oversee by the College of William & Mary's President Benjamin S. Ewell, who owned a farm in James City County. He was commissioned as an officer in the Confederate Army after the college closed in June 1861 for the duration of the war.

There was combat in the Williamsburg area in the spring of 1862 during the Peninsula Campaign, a Union effort to take Richmond from the east from a base at Fort Monroe. Throughout late 1861 and early 1862, the small contingent of Confederate defenders was known as the Army of the Peninsula, and led by popular General John B. Magruder. He successfully used ruse tactics to bluff the invaders as to the size and strength of his forces. He intimidated them into a slow movement up the Peninsula, gaining valuable time defenses to be constructed for the Confederate capital at Richmond.

In early May 1862, after holding off the Union troops for more than a month, the defenders withdrew quietly from the Warwick Line (stretching across the Peninsula between Yorktown and Mulberry Island). As General George McClellan's Union forces moved up the Peninsula to pursue the retreating Confederate forces, a rear guard force led by General James Longstreet and supported by General J.E.B. Stuart's cavalry blocked their westward progression at the Williamsburg Line.

At the Battle of Williamsburg on May 5, 1862, and the next day, May 6, the city fell to the Union. But, the retreating defenders behind the Williamsburg Line had succeeded in delaying the Union forces long enough for the retreating Confederates safely to reach the outer defenses of Richmond. McClellan besieged Richmond resulted, culminating in the Seven Days Battles, but he failed to take the city. The war dragged on for nearly three more years at great cost to lives and finances for both sides before its conclusion in April 1865. Much damage was done to the Williamsburg area during the Union occupation, which lasted until September 1865.

== 20th–21st centuries ==
In the 1930s, the Merrimack Trail was improved as State Route 168 from Anderson Corner (near Toano in western James City County) to the eastern tip of the Peninsula to reach ferry services across the harbor of Hampton Roads to Norfolk. Its purpose was to supplement the capacity of parallel U.S. Route 60, especially as traffic volume grew with the development of Colonial Williamsburg. It featured a bridge across College Creek. Nearby, the new State Route 132 was built to provide access to the Colonial Parkway, the Visitor Center of Colonial Williamsburg, and a planned non-commercially featured entrance to the Historic Area and downtown points. The brick colonial-style Chesapeake and Ohio Railway station has been restored and is used as the Williamsburg Transportation Center). Route 132 bridged Queen's Creek, slightly upstream from the Merrimack Trail.

In the 1960s, Interstate 64 was built through the area. The bridges across Queen's Creek, which has grown wide by that point, are among the largest along the highway in York County. Motorists in both directions are given a scenic view of the brackish creek, adjacent wetlands and waterfowl.

North of Interstate 64, Queen's Creek forms the border between the military reservations land of Camp Peary and the Cheatham Annex section of the Naval Weapons Station Yorktown. The former towns of Magruder and Bigler's Mill were located north of Queen's Creek in this area. The former town of Penniman was located south of Queen's Creek and north of King's Creek, near their respective confluences with the York River. With the development of the military reservations, the three towns were condemned and evacuated for the military development, joining other "lost towns" of Virginia. Many displaced residents relocated nearby; some families and their descendants live in Grove in southeastern James City County.

== See also ==
- List of rivers of Virginia

== Sources ==
=== Publications ===
- McCartney, Martha W. (1977) James City County: Keystone of the Commonwealth; James City County, Virginia; Donning and Company; ISBN 0-89865-999-X

=== Websites ===
- Cast Down Your Buckets Where You Are, An Ethnohistorical Study of the African-American Community on the Lands of the Yorktown Naval Weapons Station 1865–1918
