= Dare, Virginia =

Unincorporated community in Virginia, US

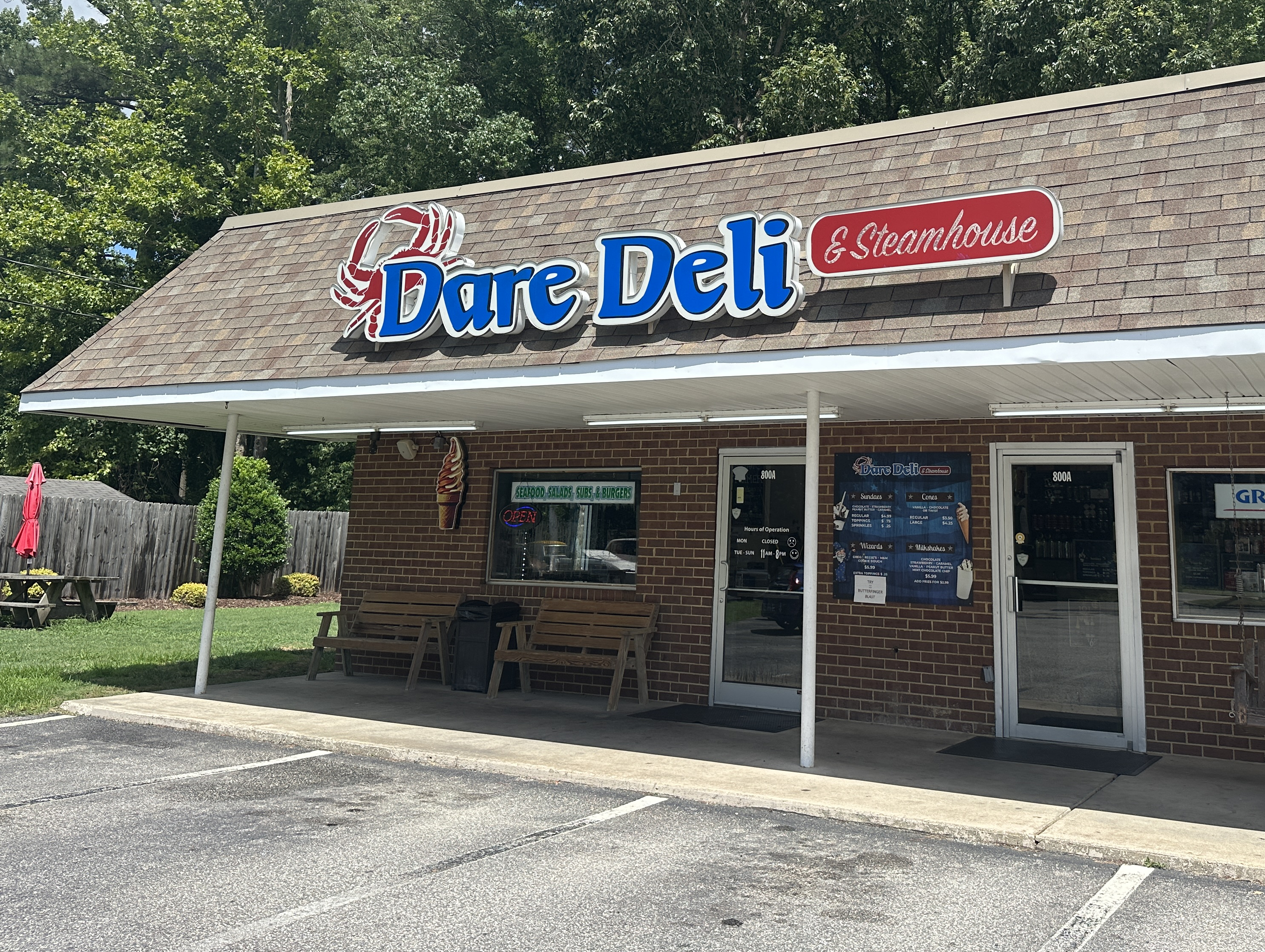
The Dare Deli storefront

Dare is an unincorporated community in York County, Virginia, United States, on the Virginia Peninsula. There is a shop called "Dare Deli".
