= Halstead's Point, Virginia =

Coordinates: 37°12′49.5″N 76°34′59.3″W

Halstead's Point was an unincorporated community in York County, Virginia. In 1918, during World War I, a large tract of land in the area including Halstead's Point was taken by the U.S. Navy to create a military base initially known as a mine depot, where ordnance for military shifts was handled. Today, the lost town of Halstead's Point is unrecognizable, but was located near the Gate 3 of the US Naval Weapons Station Yorktown just off State Route 143 and east of Interstate 64.

== See also ==
- Lackey, Virginia
- Grove, Virginia
- Penniman, Virginia

== Sources ==
=== Publications ===
- McCartney, Martha W. (1977) James City County: Keystone of the Commonwealth; James City County, Virginia; Donning and Company; ISBN 0-89865-999-X

=== Websites ===
- "Cast Down Your Buckets Where You Are" An Ethnohistorical Study of the African-American Community on the Lands of the Yorktown Naval Weapons Station 1865-1918
