= Virginia Peninsula =

Peninsula in southeast Virginia, United States

Coordinates: 37°4′47.4″N 76°24′22.5″W

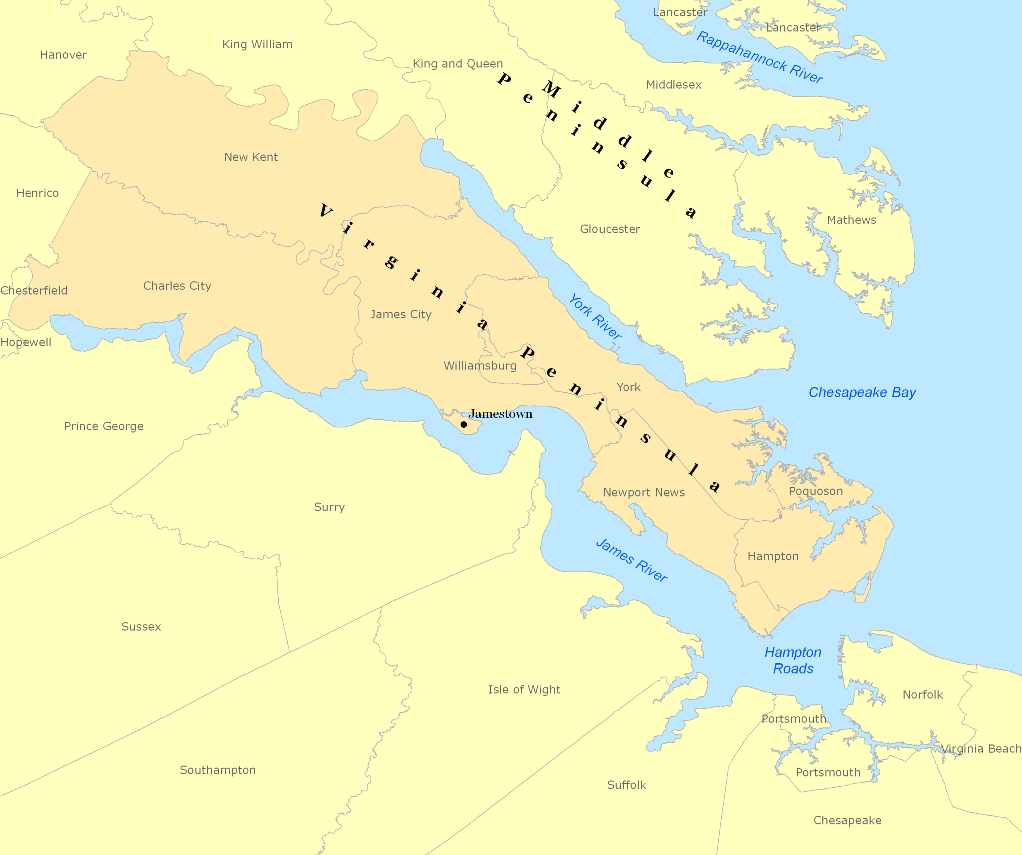
The Virginia Peninsula is highlighted in orange

Virginia Peninsula

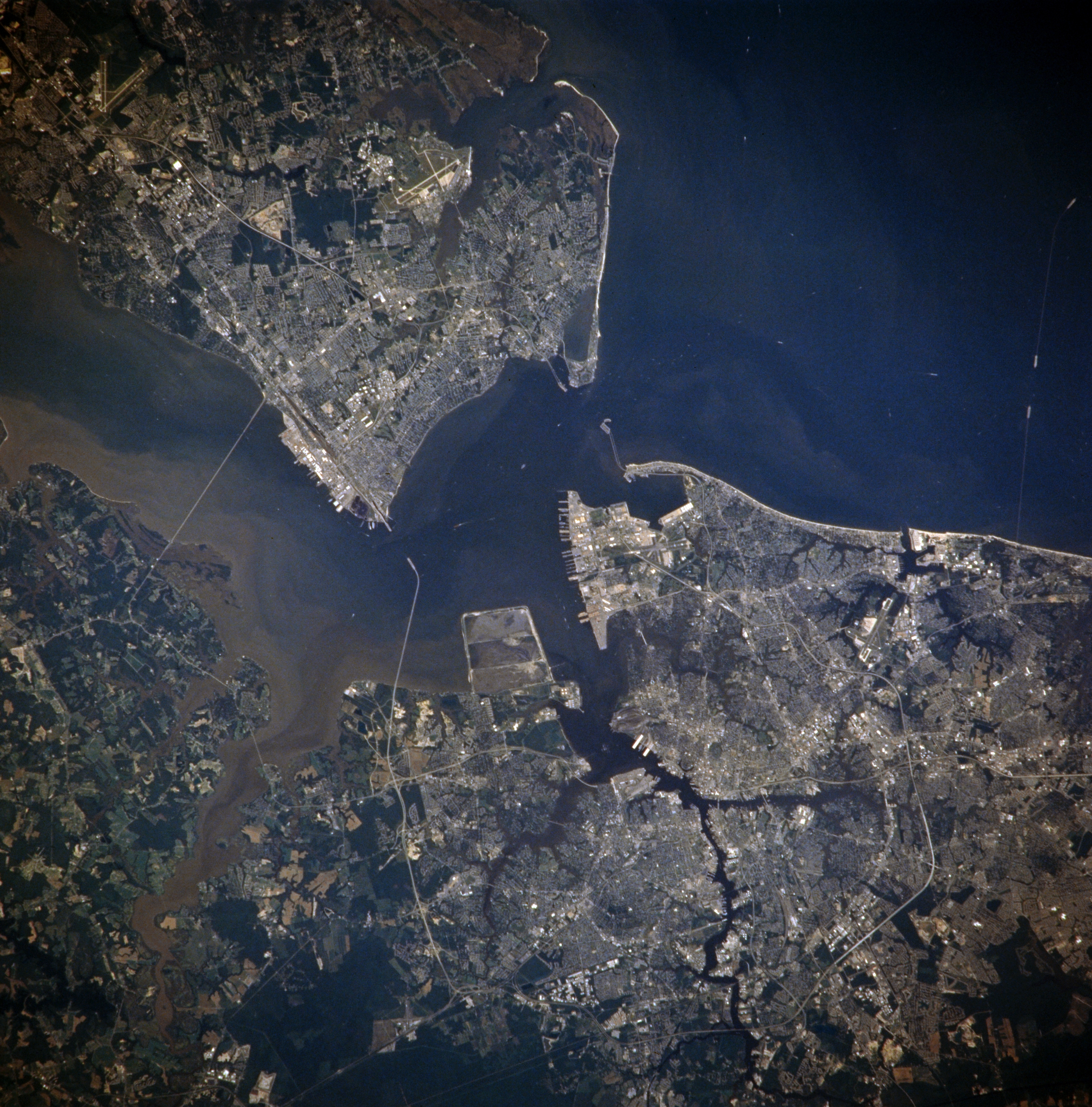
This 1996 satellite photo shows Hampton Roads, with the lower (southeastern) end of Virginia Peninsula filling most of the top half of the image

The Virginia Peninsula is the natural landform located in southeast Virginia outlined by the York River, James River, Hampton Roads and the Chesapeake Bay. It is sometimes known as the Lower Peninsula to distinguish it from two other peninsulas to the north, the Middle Peninsula and the Northern Neck.

It is the site of historic Jamestown, founded in 1607 as the first permanent English settlement in North America. Geographically located at the northwestern reaches, Charles City and New Kent counties are part of the Virginia Peninsula. In the 21st century, they are also considered part of the Richmond–Petersburg region. The rest of the Virginia Peninsula is all part of the Virginia Beach–Norfolk–Newport News, VA–NC MSA (metropolitan statistical area) with a population of about 1.8 million. The Hampton Roads MSA is the common name for the metropolitan area that surrounds the body of water of the same name. It is the seventh-largest metropolitan area in the Southeast and the 32nd largest in the United States.

The land portion of Hampton Roads has been historically divided into two regions, the Virginia Peninsula or Peninsula on the north side, and South Hampton Roads on the south side. More recently, the boundaries of the Hampton Roads metropolitan area have expanded to include the two southernmost counties of the Middle Peninsula (Gloucester and Mathews), across the York River from the Virginia Peninsula.

== History ==
=== Spanish exploration ===
Early in the 16th century, Spanish explorers were the first Europeans to see the Chesapeake Bay, which they called Bahía de Madre de Dios or Bahía de Santa Maria. They were searching for the Northwest Passage to India and the Orient. They named the land now known as Virginia, as Ajacán.

The Spanish succeeded in founding a colonial settlement in the New World in 1565 at St. Augustine, Florida. It was the first founded by Europeans in what is now the United States. They established small Spanish outposts along the eastern coast into present-day Georgia and the Carolinas. The northernmost post was Santa Elena (today Port Royal, South Carolina). From there Juan Pardo was commissioned to lead expeditions into the interior, founding Fort San Juan in 1567–1568 at the regional Mississippian culture chiefdom of Joara. Located in present-day western North Carolina, this was the first European settlement in the interior of North America.

=== English settlement ===
The first permanent English settlement in North America was established in 1607 at Jamestown. The first continuously occupied settlement was at Kecoughtan in Elizabeth City County what is now the City of Hampton. Nearby, Fort Monroe, formerly the country's oldest military base still in use, is located at Old Point Comfort. Old Point Comfort is also the site of the first landing of Africans in America, in 1619. After declaring independence from Great Britain, Virginia's first state capital was Williamsburg. Also, the decisive battle of the American Revolution, the siege of Yorktown in 1781, took place on the Virginia Peninsula.

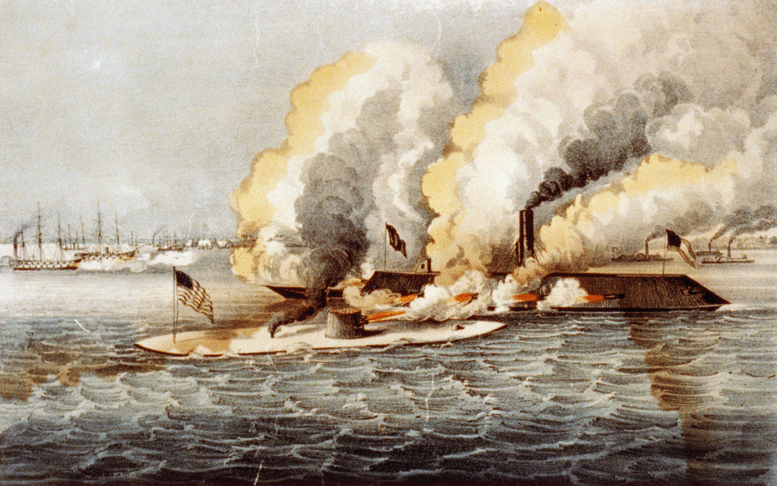
The Battle of Hampton Roads, as depicted by Currier and Ives

=== American Civil War ===
During the American Civil War (1861–1865), the Union Army invaded the Virginia Peninsula as part of the Peninsula Campaign in 1862 to capture Richmond, beginning from Fort Monroe at the entrance to Hampton Roads, which had remained in Union control after Virginia seceded in 1861. At the outset of the Peninsula Campaign, the Battle of Hampton Roads between the first ironclad warships took place near the mouth of the James River off the eastern tip of Warwick County. The 1862 Siege of Yorktown took place along the York River. Finally, after a lengthy standoff, the largest Union Army of the war under General George B. McClellan chased the retreating Confederates through the Williamsburg Line and westward literally to the "Gates of Richmond", where the swampy upper reaches of the Chickahominy River created a natural barrier behind which the defenders successfully held the Confederate capital, essentially prolonging the war for three more devastating years.

=== Post-war ===
As the region and Virginia rebuilt during Reconstruction, the Chesapeake and Ohio Railway (C&O) under the leadership of Collis P. Huntington was completed from Richmond to the Ohio River by 1871. Long a dream of Virginians, and later sponsored by both Virginia and West Virginia, the new railroad opened paths to ship products west, as well as offering an economically viable method of shipping the rich bituminous coal of the region to fuel the Industrial Revolution. However, the tidal portion of the James River, while navigable from Hampton Roads to the Fall Line at Richmond, couldn't accommodate the deep drafts of collier ships.

The Peninsula had been long without a railroad, which had been newly developing technology beginning in the 1830s. In 1881, the Peninsula Extension of the C&O was built from Richmond through Williamsburg to Newport News Point. There, Collis Huntington, his associates, and his Old Dominion Land Company developed his vision for the area. Within only 15 years, a rural farm community in Warwick County turned into the new independent city of Newport News, Virginia, by 1896 as new coal piers brought ships to what would become the world's largest shipyard, Newport News Shipbuilding and Drydock Company. Hotels, houses, schools and businesses sprung up there, and at many points along the new rail line in Warwick, York and James City counties. Oyster Point became a shipping place for the watermen and the new town of Lee Hall, Virginia, emerged, and became an important point due to its proximity to Yorktown and later to the new military base which became the U.S. Army's Fort Eustis. In Elizabeth City County, tracks were extended from Newport News to reach Old Point Comfort, where resort hotels and Buckroe Beach were developed. There, a new town was incorporated. Phoebus was named after one of its early leading citizens, Harrison Phoebus.

=== 20th century ===
In James City County, Toano became a major shipping point for the area's truck farming and an entire new development planned by a C&O land agent to attract farmers of Scandinavian descent from the colder regions of the American Mid-West emerged at Norge shortly after the start of the 20th century. Later in the first half of the 20th century, especially during the two world wars, massive military facilities were established on large reservations which today contain Langley Air Force Base, Fort Eustis, Naval Weapons Station Yorktown, and Camp Peary. To make way, all of Mulberry Island and entire communities including Lackey, Halstead's Point, Penniman, Bigler's Mill, and Magruder disappeared in the process. However, many of the displaced Virginians chose to relocate to Grove in James City County and other areas close by on the Peninsula.

After the capital of Virginia moved to Richmond in 1780 for greater security during the American Revolutionary War, Williamsburg became much less busy. By the early 20th century, it was described as a "sleepy little hamlet", known best for the College of William and Mary and Eastern State Hospital, which was the successor to the country's first mental hospital, as well as its fading memories and deteriorating colonial sites. All that changed dramatically beginning in 1926. The restoration and recreation of Colonial Williamsburg, one of the largest historic restorations ever undertaken, was championed by the Reverend Dr. W.A.R. Goodwin and the patriarch of the Rockefeller family, John D. Rockefeller Jr., along with the active participation of his wife, Abby Aldrich Rockefeller, who wanted to celebrate the patriots and the early history of the United States. The restoration of the colonial capital, construction of the Colonial Parkway by the U.S. National Park Service, several major enhancements at Jamestown and Yorktown, and development of several theme parks such as Busch Gardens Williamsburg beginning in the 1970s, all combined to help make the Historic Triangle area of Colonial Virginia become one of the most popular tourist destinations in the United States by the end of the 20th century.

== Local government ==
In Colonial times, and even in the first 150 years of the United States, much like Virginia as a whole, the Virginia Peninsula was in an almost constant state of change in terms of local government, largely due to growth, as counties were divided and towns were formed as the population grew. Some towns grew to become cities. Under the state constitutional changes in 1871, extant and future cities in Virginia became independent cities of the counties they had formerly been located within.

However, in the second half of the 20th century, an unprecedented wave of city-county-town local government consolidations took place in South Hampton Roads and on the Virginia Peninsula. Nowhere else in Virginia have rural areas and more dense cities been combined in such a manner as these two areas. The changes resulted in the two areas having Virginia's cities with the largest land areas and the most farming, even over 30 years after the consolidations in some instances.

=== Newport News–Hampton Metropolitan Area (1960–1983) ===
In 1960, the "Newport News–Hampton Metropolitan Statistical Area" was designated a metropolitan area by the U.S. Census Bureau. It comprised the cities of Newport News, Hampton and York County.

In 1983, the MSA, comprising the cities of Newport News, Hampton, Poquoson and Williamsburg, and the counties of Gloucester, James City and York, was combined with the Norfolk–Virginia Beach–Portsmouth MSA and renamed the "Norfolk–Virginia Beach–Newport News MSA".

Virginia Peninsula Metropolitan Population History 1960–1980
#	City/County	1960	1970	1980
1	Newport News	113,662	138,177	144,903
2	Hampton	89,258	120,779	122,617
3	Williamsburg	-	-	9,870
4	Poquoson	-	-	8,726
5	York County, VA	21,583	33,203	35,463
6	James City County, VA	-	-	22,763
7	Gloucester County, VA	-	-	20,107
Metropolitan Area total		224,503	292,159	364,449

=== Current political subdivisions ===
The Virginia Peninsula subregion includes four independent cities (Hampton, Newport News, Poquoson and Williamsburg) and two counties (James City County and York County). There are currently no incorporated towns. There were also a number of political subdivisions which are now extinct, primarily due to both growth of communities and consolidation of local government (see section below).

Name	County Seat	Area (km^{2})	Population 1990 Census	Population 2000 Census	Population 2010 Census	Population 2020 Census
Hampton	none	352.83	133,811	146,437	137,436	137,148
Newport News	none	308.34	170,045	180,150	180,719	186,247
Poquoson	Yorktown (Courts shared)	203.13	11,005	11,566	12,150	12,460
Williamsburg	Williamsburg	22.46	11,530	11,998	14,068	15,425
James City County	Williamsburg	465.45	34,859	48,102	67,009	78,254
York County	Yorktown	558.19	42,422	56,297	65,464	70,045
Totals		1,910.40	403,672	454,550	476,846	499,579

=== Defunct political subdivisions ===
Many incorporated (formally constituted) localities have become legally void, though most have not been abandoned by their citizens, with the notable exception of Jamestown. Exclusive of towns which became cities and still have the same name, no less than 4 shires, 2 counties, 4 towns, and 1 city no longer exist in the Virginia Peninsula area under their earlier names.

The following is a listing of these 11 extinct shire, counties, towns, and cities, with the approximate dates they existed:

- Jamestown, Virginia (1607) largely abandoned as a Town after 1699
- Kecoughtan, Virginia (1610), became part of Town and City of Hampton
- Middle Plantation (1632), became Williamsburg after 1699
- Elizabeth River Shire (1634–1643)
- Warwick River Shire (1634–1643)
- Charles River Shire (1634–1643)
- James City Shire (1634–1643)
- Elizabeth City County (1643–1952), now part of the city of Hampton.
- Warwick County (aka Warwick River County) (1643–1952), now part of the city of Newport News
- Town of Phoebus (1900–1952) (earlier known as unincorporated towns of Millwood, Roseland Farms, Chesapeake City), became part of city of Hampton
- City of Warwick (1952–1958), became part of city of Newport News

=== Major bridges, bridge tunnels, ferry system ===
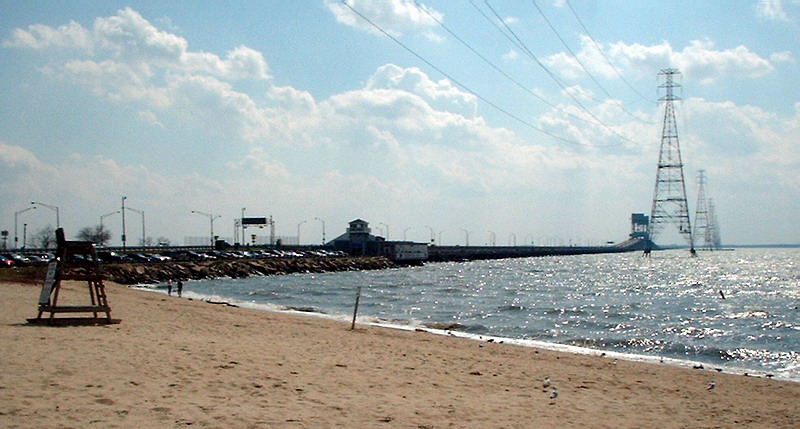
James River Bridge, viewed from Huntington Park Beach

Generally surrounded by water, the Virginia Peninsula is linked to other areas across the surrounding water barriers of the James and York Rivers, and the harbor of Hampton Roads by 2 bridge–tunnels, 2 large drawbridges, and a state-operated ferry system. These are:

- Hampton Roads Bridge–Tunnel
- Monitor–Merrimac Memorial Bridge–Tunnel
- James River Bridge
- George P. Coleman Memorial Bridge
- Jamestown Ferry

=== Interstate Highways ===
- Interstate 64
- Interstate 664
- Hampton Roads Beltway

=== U.S. and State Routes ===
- U.S. Route 17
- U.S. Route 60
- U.S. Route 258
- State Route 5
- State Route 31
- State Route 32
- State Route 134
- State Route 143
- State Route 199 (Humelsine Parkway)

== Scenic parkways and trails ==
- Colonial Parkway
- Virginia Capital Trail

== U.S. military installations ==
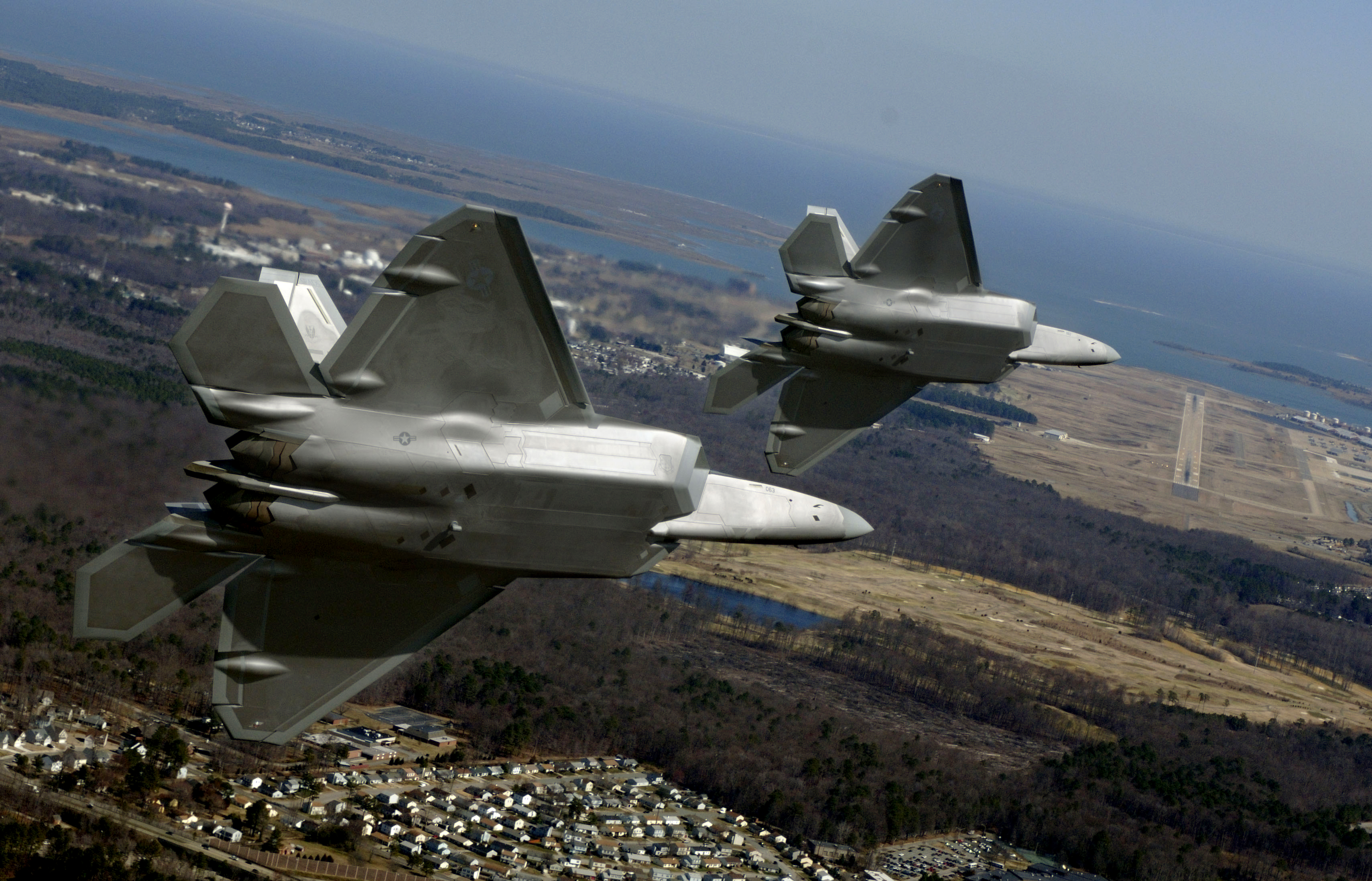
Two F-22A turn in on final approach to Langley Air Force Base

The Virginia Peninsula is home to several military bases.

=== City of Hampton ===
Langley Air Force Base is located in Hampton. Fort Monroe had been the oldest installation in the region but closed in September 2011. The now decommissioned Fort Wool, located on a manmade island called Rip Raps across the mouth of Hampton Roads from Fort Monroe, is also in Hampton.

=== City of Newport News ===
Fort Eustis, home of the U.S. Army Training and Doctrine Command (TRADOC) is in Newport News. A major military contractor, Newport News Shipbuilding, is also in the city.

=== York County ===
York County is home to the U.S. Navy's Yorktown Naval Weapons Station and a supply depot at nearby Cheatham Annex. Camp Peary and Coast Guard Training Center Yorktown are also located in York County.

=== James City County ===
Although each is primarily located in other jurisdictions, portions of Fort Eustis, Naval Weapons Station Yorktown, Cheatham Annex, and Camp Peary extend into James City County.

== See also ==
- Historic Triangle
- Colonial Williamsburg
- Jamestown Festival Park (1957–present)
- Battle of Hampton Roads
- Jamestown Exposition (1907)
- Mariners' Museum
- Chesapeake and Ohio Railway (C&O)
- Peninsula Extension (of the C&O to Newport News)
- College of William & Mary

== Sources ==
- Quarstein, John V. (1997), The Civil War on the Virginia Peninsula, Arcadia Publishing, ISBN 978-0-7385-4438-0
- Quarstein, John V. (1999), World War I on the Virginia Peninsula, Arcadia Publishing, ISBN 0-7385-6886-4
- Fox Hill Historical Society (2004), Fox Hill on the Virginia Peninsula, Arcadia Publishing, ISBN 0-7385-1602-3
