= Camp Peary =

American military base

AFETA CAMP PEARY
- York County and James City County, Virginia

Site information
- Owner: U.S. Department of Defense
- Open to the public: No
- Condition: Fully operational

Location
- Location within Virginia Location within the United States
- Coordinates: 37.33°N 76.67°W

Site history
- Built: 1942
- In use: 1942–1946; 1951–present

Garrison information
- Occupants: Central Intelligence Agency; Defense Intelligence Agency; United States Navy

Airfield information
- Identifiers: FAA LID: W94
- Elevation: 41 feet (12 m) AMSL
Runways
Direction	Length and surface
05/23	5,018 feet (1,529 m) Asphalt

Camp Peary is a U.S. military reservation in York County near Williamsburg, Virginia, which hosts a covert CIA training facility known as "The Farm". Officially referred to as an Armed Forces Experimental Training Activity (AFETA) under the authority of the Department of Defense, Camp Peary is approximately 9,000 acres. The Farm is used to train officers of the CIA's Directorate of Operations, as well as those of the DIA's Defense Clandestine Service, among other intelligence bodies. Its facilities are available to the members of the intelligence community for "off-site" activities such as conferences and working groups. Camp Peary has a sister facility, "The Point", located in Hertford, North Carolina.

Camp Peary is named for Arctic explorer Rear Admiral Robert E. Peary. Porto Bello, the historic hunting lodge of Lord Dunmore, last royal governor of Virginia, is listed on the National Register of Historic Places and is located on the grounds of Camp Peary.

== Location ==
Comprising 9,275 acres (37.53 km^{2}) of land, of which about 8,000 acres (32 km^{2}) are unimproved or only partially improved. The 100 acres (40 hm^{2}) Biglers Millpond occupies the site adjacent to the York River.

The majority of Camp Peary falls within York County, though a small portion of the reservation near Skimino Creek at the western edge is located in James City County.

== World War II, relocations of residents ==
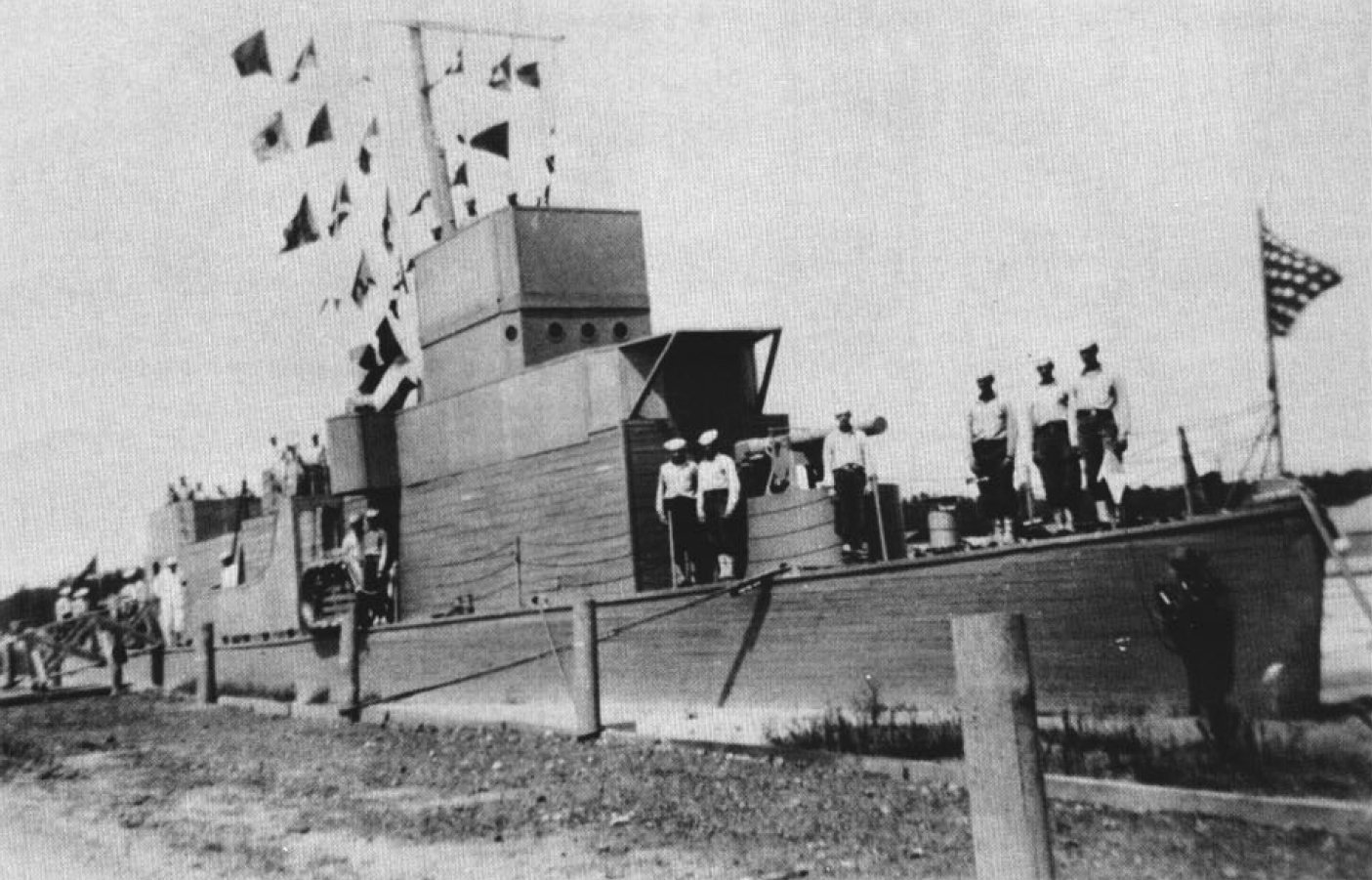
"Miss Never Sail": a wooden mock-up of a destroyer escort at Camp Peary used for training in 1945

During World War II, beginning in 1942, the United States Navy took over a large area on the north side of the Virginia Peninsula in York County, Virginia which became known as Camp Peary, initially for use as a Seabee training base. The Chesapeake and Ohio Railway (C&O) extended a spur track from its Richmond-Newport News main line tracks to the site from nearby Williamsburg, and established Magruder Station near the former unincorporated town of Magruder. As part of the process of converting the property to a military reservation, all residents of the entire towns of Magruder and Bigler's Mill had to vacate. The town of Magruder was a traditionally African-American community, established for freedmen after the American Civil War. It had been named for Confederate General John B. Magruder. A Civil War field hospital had occupied the site of Bigler's Mill near the York River. Although the graves in the church cemetery were not moved, many of the residents and the local Mount Gilead Baptist Church were relocated to the Grove community, located on U.S. Route 60 in adjacent James City County a few miles away, where a number of displaced residents from an area near Lackey known simply as "the Reservation" had earlier relocated under similar circumstances during World War I when what is now the Naval Weapons Station Yorktown was created.

=== Seabee training ===
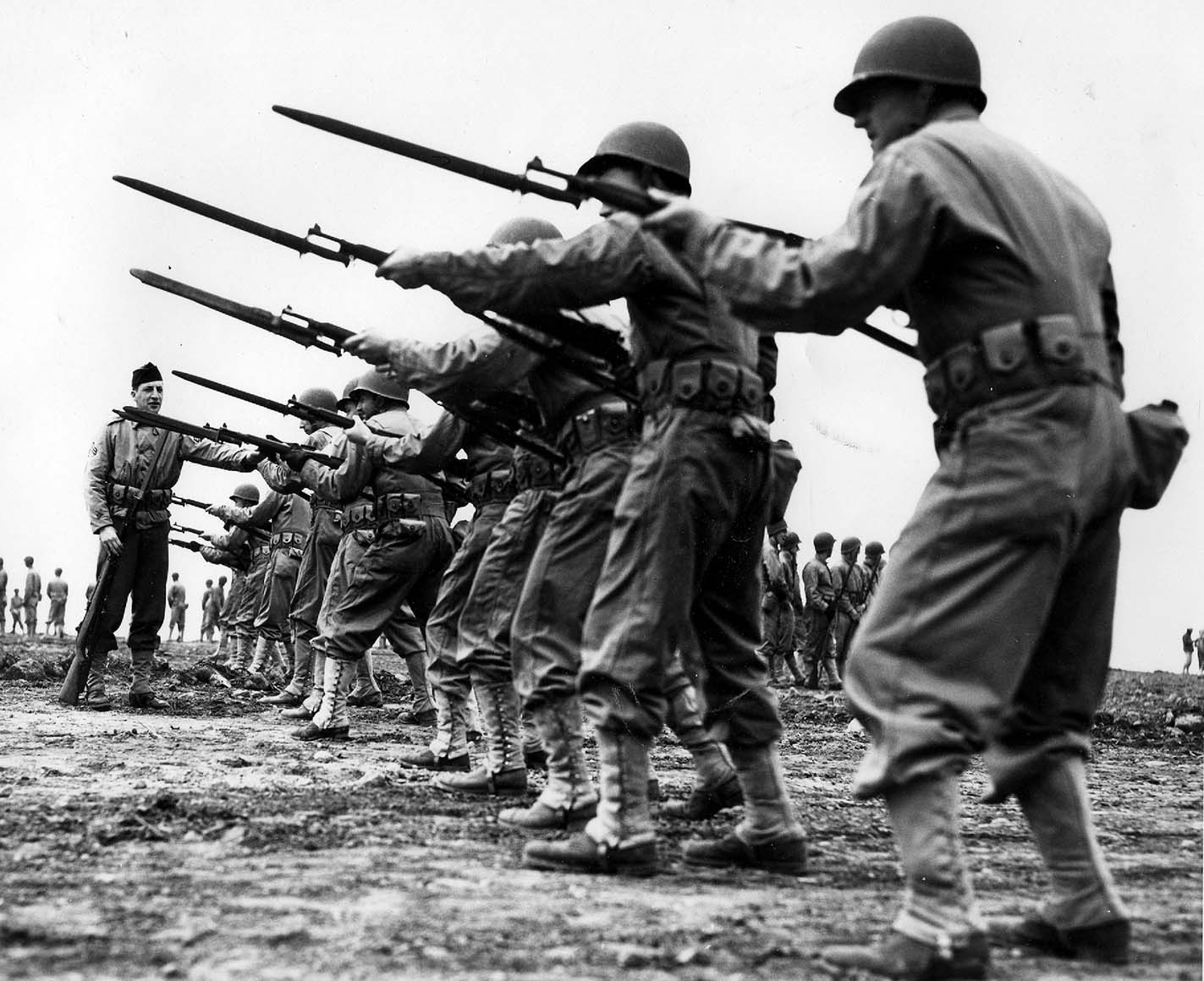
USMC directed fixed bayonet drill at Camp Peary NTC, VA in 1943.

At the outset of the War, the preliminary training of the Seabees had been carried out at Naval Training Stations across the country. That lasted a short period until boot training was consolidated at Camp Allen Virginia. Camp Allen was replaced by Camp Bradford which in turn was replaced by Camp Peary. The initial Seabee recruits of WWII were men who built Boulder Dam, America's highways and New York City skyscrapers. At Naval Construction Training Center Peary, Seabees were taught basic military order, discipline, weaponry, stevedoring, and construction trades. The Camp opened in November 3rd of 1942 with the 36th CB the first to train there while the first organized there was the 61st CB. Another 100,000 men would go through the camp before training there ceased in June of 1944. During that period the Seabees established over 60 trade schools on the base. In June of 1943 the dynamite and demolition school opened. Some of its first graduates included the first six classes of Seabee volunteers for the Naval Combat Demolition Units. After June 1944 Seabee boot camp was moved to Camp Endicott, Quonset Point, Rhode Island.

Base commander Capt. J.G. Ware had the idea to raise hogs on base, so the recruits called the place "Capt. Ware's hog farm". Originally, the hog yard was in the center of the camp, but the enlisted complained that the pigs were on high ground while they were in the mud. This led to the hogs being moved to a more obscure location, but still within the limits of the military reservation. A bulldozer was used for clearing the feed troughs and transporting slop from the galley to the hog yard. Eventually, the farming enterprise made the news and it is from this history that the base derives its "The Farm" moniker used today.

=== German prisoners-of-war ===
Camp Peary's mission changed when a new need presented itself to the Navy. A portion of the land became a detention center for German prisoners of war in the United States (POWs). Many of them were Kriegsmarine crewmen from captured German U-boats and from ships the Germans thought lost at sea with crews presumed dead. It was important to keep the German authorities unaware of their capture, since knowledge that they had survived would mean that secret code books and Enigma machines thought lost at sea could also have been compromised. Learning that these men were being held as POWs, would almost certainly have caused the Germans to change the secret codes that had been broken by Allied codebreakers, thus, extra secrecy was necessary. There is information about life at the Camp and the German PoWs in the Herman Recht papers held by the College of William and Mary, a set of letters written by a clerk at the Camp.

Many of the former POWs stayed in Virginia and the United States after the war, and became naturalized as U.S. citizens.

== Post-World War II use ==
Vacated by the Navy in 1946, Camp Peary became a Virginia state forestry and game reserve for five years. A reservoir that had been built on the upper reaches of Queen's Creek to supply the substantial fresh water needs of Camp Peary when it was a Seabee base was divested to the City of Williamsburg. The Waller Mill Reservoir formed the basis for the city's Waller Mill Park, although the park is located north of the city limits in York County. A portion of the abandoned Chesapeake and Ohio Railway spur from the Peninsula Extension main line just east of near Ewell Station to the base (also built during World War II) is now a recreational rail trail.

Then, in 1951, the U.S. Navy returned to the property, securing the portion north of the highway, which was State Route 168 at the time, and announced it closed to the public; it has been that way ever since. In June 1961, two months after the Bay of Pigs Invasion, the Navy announced it was officially opening a new facility at Harvey Point base, in Hertford, North Carolina. A spokesman said that all four branches of the military would conduct "testing and evaluation of various classified materials and equipment" at the new site. He added that some of the training "now being done at Camp Peary, Va., will be transferred to Harvey Point."

=== The Farm ===
Camp Peary is known as "The Farm", a training facility run by the Central Intelligence Agency for the purpose of training CIA's clandestine officers, as well as officers of other organizations specializing in clandestine activities, such as the Defense Intelligence Agency. The existence of this facility is widely known but has never been formally acknowledged by the U.S. government. Access to Camp Peary is strictly controlled, and visitors to the installation are escorted at all times. The portion of the original World War II Seabee base north of Interstate 64 has been closed to the public since 1951. However, the roads and many structures of Magruder and Bigler's Mill are still there and many are occupied. An airport with a 5,000-foot (1,500 m) runway was added to the facility near the site of Bigler's Mill. Flight records show that at least 11 aircraft that appear to be owned by CIA front companies, and are believed to have been used as rendition aircraft by the CIA under the guise of charter flights, have landed on this runway.

Former CIA officer Bill Wagner attended a three-week interrogation course at The Farm in 1970. He claims it was the agency's "premier course", and that volunteers played the role of interrogation subjects in order to be guaranteed seats in future classes. Interrogators-in-training practiced techniques such as sleep deprivation, deliberately tainted food, and mock executions. According to Wagner, the course was dropped from the CIA training curriculum after the Watergate scandal, due to increased attention being paid to CIA practices.

== See also ==
- Agent handling
- CIA University
- Harvey Point
- Sherman Kent School for Intelligence Analysis
- Special Activities Center
- United States Army Intelligence Center
- Warrenton Training Center
- Camp Dawson

== Bibliography ==
- Baldacci, David (2007). Simple Genius. Warner Books. ISBN 9780446581738.
- Moran, Lindsay (2005). Blowing My Cover: My Life as a CIA Spy. G. P. Putnam's Sons. ISBN 9780399152399.
- Waters, T. J (2007). Class 11: My Story Inside the CIA's First Post-9/11 Spy Class. Penguin Publishing Group. ISBN 9780452288713.
