= Magruder, Virginia =

Ghost town in Virginia, USA

Coordinates: 37°19′20″N 76°40′31″W

Magruder was a small unincorporated town in Virginia near Williamsburg in York County. Settled mostly by African-American freedmen after the American Civil War, it once had its own church, post office, cemetery, lodge, and homes. After this land was acquired for the development of the US military reservation known as Camp Peary, all the residents and businesses were displaced. Magruder is considered extinct and one of the lost towns of Virginia.

== History ==
Magruder was located in York County. The site was north of the colonial-era capital of Williamsburg and just west of Queen's Creek, which flows into the York River on the north side of the Virginia Peninsula.

The small settlement which became Magruder was named for American Civil War Confederate General John B. "Prince John" Magruder. During the Peninsula Campaign of the American Civil War in 1862, a large federal force under General George B. McClellan began at Fort Monroe at the entrance to Hampton Roads and moved west to try to capture the Confederate capital city of Richmond.

General Magruder headed a small force known as the Army of the Peninsula. His mission was to delay the federal advance, and he became well known for his deceptive and successful tactics in doing so. The federal campaign of General McClellan culminated in failure after the series of battles known as the Seven Days Battles just east of Richmond.

After the Civil War and Emancipation, the area in which Magruder was located became settled by African American families, who were mostly former slaves (freedmen). Decades later, the Chesapeake and Ohio Railway (C&O) built through the area in 1881 to reach the coal piers and the new city of Newport News on the ice-free harbor of Hampton Roads. The C&O later built a spur line which extended to Magruder Station.

During World War II, in 1942–43, the U.S. Navy took over a large area in the north western portion of York County to train Seabees and hold special German prisoners-of-war which became known as Camp Peary. All residents of the entire towns of Magruder and Bigler's Mill were removed. Many of the black residents of Magruder and the Baptist church relocated to the majority-black community of Grove in nearby James City County. The Presbyterian church, which, with its cemetery, is close to the entrance, remains. Grove had been sparsely populated until the years after 1918, when a large influx of displaced black families moved there after their land was taken to create a military reservation which became the Naval Weapons Station Yorktown.

After World War II, the Camp Peary area was transferred to the Commonwealth of Virginia and was used as a state game preserve. Then, in 1951, the Navy reclaimed the land and closed the base to the public. Despite efforts at secrecy, Camp Peary eventually became well known as "The Farm," a training facility for the U.S. Central Intelligence Agency (CIA). Although access to the base is still restricted the roads and many structures of Magruder and Bigler's Mill are still there and many are occupied.

== See also ==
- Bigler's Mill, Virginia
- Penniman, Virginia
- Former counties, cities, and towns of Virginia
