= York County, Virginia =

County in Virginia, United States

- County
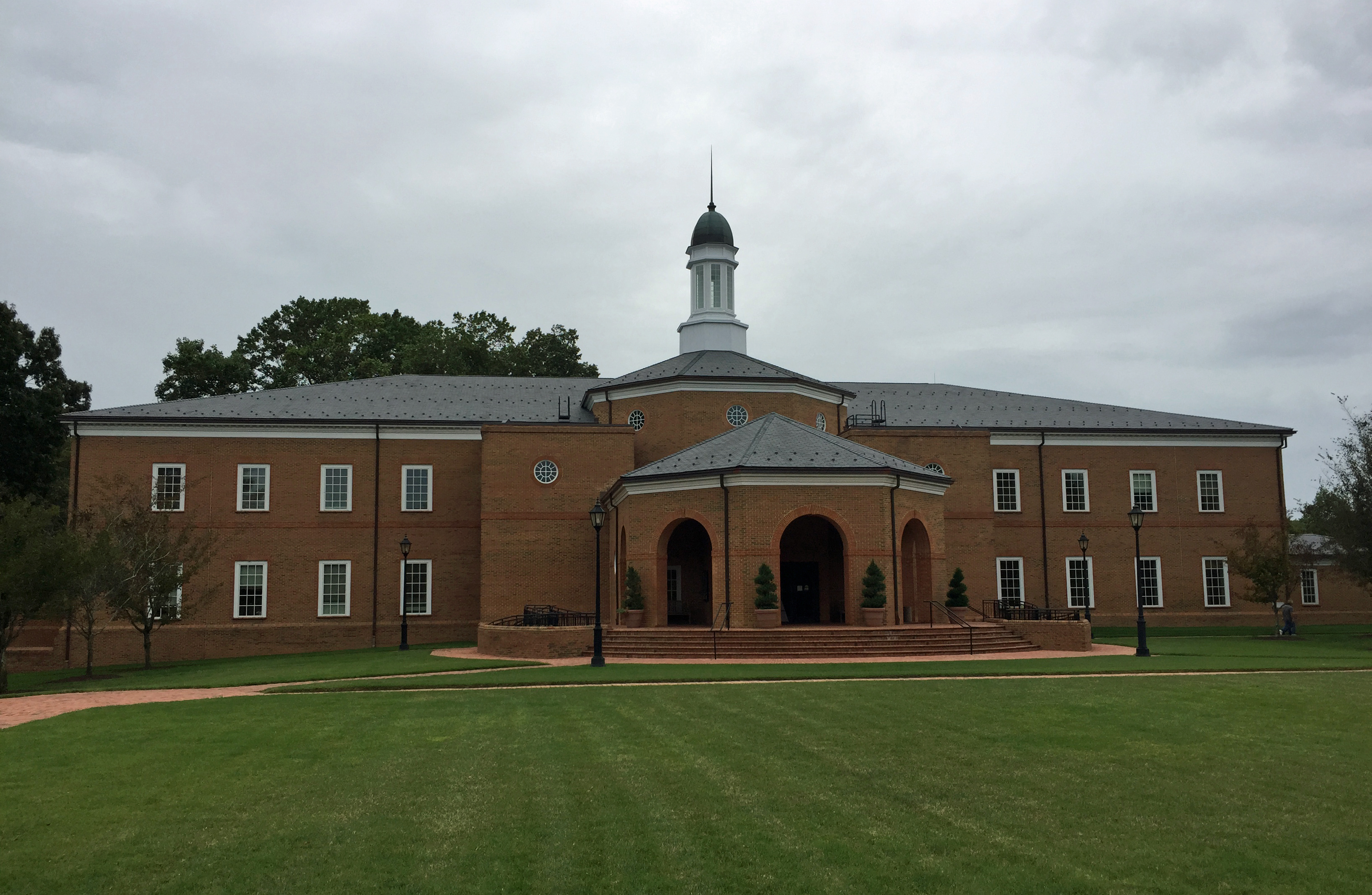
- York County Courthouse

- Seal

- Location within the U.S. state of Virginia
- Coordinates: 37°13′N 76°26′W
- Country: United States
- State: Virginia
- Founded: 1643
- Named for: York
- Seat: Yorktown
- Largest community: Grafton

Area
  - Total: 215 sq mi (560 km^{2})
  - Land: 105 sq mi (270 km^{2})
  - Water: 110 sq mi (280 km^{2}) 51.3%

Population (2020)
  - Total: 70,045
  - Estimate (2025): 71,374 ▲
  - Density: 667/sq mi (258/km^{2})
- Time zone: UTC−5 (Eastern)
  - Summer (DST): UTC−4 (EDT)
- Congressional district: 1st
- Website: www.yorkcounty.gov

York County (formerly Charles River County) is a county in the eastern part of the Commonwealth of Virginia, located in the Tidewater. As of the 2020 United States census, the population was 70,045. The county seat is the unincorporated town of Yorktown.

Located on the north side of the Virginia Peninsula, with the York River as its northern border, York County is included in the Virginia Beach–Norfolk–Newport News, VA–NC Metropolitan Statistical Area.

York County contains many tributaries of the York River. It shares land borders with the independent cities of Williamsburg, Newport News, Hampton, and Poquoson, as well as James City County, and shares a border along the York River with Gloucester County.

Formed in 1634 as Charles River Shire, one of the eight original shires (counties) of the Virginia Colony, and renamed York County in 1643, York County is one of the oldest counties in the United States. Yorktown is one of the three points of the Historic Triangle of Colonial Virginia. It is the site of the last battle and surrender of British forces in 1781 at the conclusion of the American Revolutionary War, when the patriots gained independence from Great Britain.

In modern times, several important U.S. military installations have been developed in the county. It also has miles of waterfront residential and recreational areas. York County adjoins the Busch Gardens Williamsburg theme park and includes within its borders the affiliated Water Country USA water park, the Yorktown Riverfront area, Yorktown Battlefield and Visitor Center and American Revolution Museum at Yorktown. Yorktown is linked by the National Park Service's bucolic Colonial Parkway with Colonial Williamsburg and historic attractions at Jamestown, Virginia. Heritage tourism to the Historic Triangle draws international visitors and is a major economic activity for the county.

== History ==
=== Native American Indians ===
The area that is now York County was long inhabited by many cultures of Native Americans. These were hunter-gatherer groups during the late Woodland Period (1000 BCE to 1000 CE) and earlier.

By the late 16th century, much of the coastal plain draining to the Chesapeake Bay of the current Commonwealth of Virginia was called Tenakomakah in Algonquian, meaning "densely inhabited land". The tribes of the Tidewater area likely spoke related Algonquian languages. Other Algonquian-speaking peoples occupied coastal areas north and south along the coasts.

In the Virginia region, a weroance (leader) named Wahunsunacock (1547–1618) of the Powhatan created a powerful confederacy known as the Powhatan Confederacy; he conquered or allied by agreement with approximately 30 tribes. He was called Chief Powhatan and he was from a village also known as "Powhatan", near the fall line of the James River. (The Powhatan Hill neighborhood of the current city of Richmond was developed near this former site.) Chief Powhatan later established a second capital village, known as Werowocomoco, in a centrally located position in Tenakomakah. Rediscovered in the early 21st century by archeological work, it was located along the north bank of the York River in present-day Gloucester County.

The Chiskiack tribe of the Powhatan Confederacy lived in York County along the York River until the 1630s. Escalating conflicts with the expanding English colony based at Jamestown caused them to move to the west. The English developed a village settlement near the village of Chiskiack and adopted its name. (It is sometimes spelled "Kiskiack"). This became part of the developments included within the present-day Naval Weapons Station Yorktown near Yorktown and are included in the military base. Cheesecake Road and Cheesecake Cemetery are also within the base; their names are thought to derive from the early Chiskiack people.

After the Powhatan moved his capital from this area in 1609, the site believed to have been Werowocomoco near Purtan Bay was lost to history. It was rediscovered in the early 21st century and has been under continuing archaeological study projects. The discoveries and ongoing research led by the College of William and Mary hold great promise in expanding understanding of the lives of the Native Americans in the area during that era of York County's history.

=== Ajacán Mission ===
In 1570, Spanish Jesuit priests founded the Ajacán Mission in this area. They were guided by interpreter Don Luis, a Native American from this area who had been taken captive by an earlier expedition. He was taken to Spain and later to Mexico, where he was baptized as Don Luis and educated in the Jesuit system. Ten years later after returning to Virginia, he soon abandoned the Spanish group. In February 1571 he led an attack on the Jesuits; all of the party except a young boy were killed. The following year, a Spanish force returned to the region for punishment and reclaimed the youth Alonso. The Spanish did not attempt another mission in this part of North America.

=== Virginia Colony ===
About 30 years later, English colonists arrived and established Jamestown in 1607 on the southern shore of the Virginia Peninsula in the Colony of Virginia. In 1619, the area which is now York County was included in two of the four incorporations (or "citties") of the proprietary Virginia Company of London which were known as Elizabeth Cittie and James Cittie.

In 1634, what is now York County was formed as Charles River Shire, one of the eight original shires of Virginia and named for King Charles I. Charles River Shire took its name from the younger son of King James I. In the 21st century, it was one of the five original shires considered extant in essentially its same political form, making it one of the oldest counties in the United States.

In 1643 Charles River County and the Charles River (also named for the king) were changed to York County and York River, respectively. The river, county, and town of Yorktown are believed by some to have been named for York, a city in Yorkshire, but Charles was formerly Duke of York and his own son James II followed him as Duke of York.

=== Yorktown ===
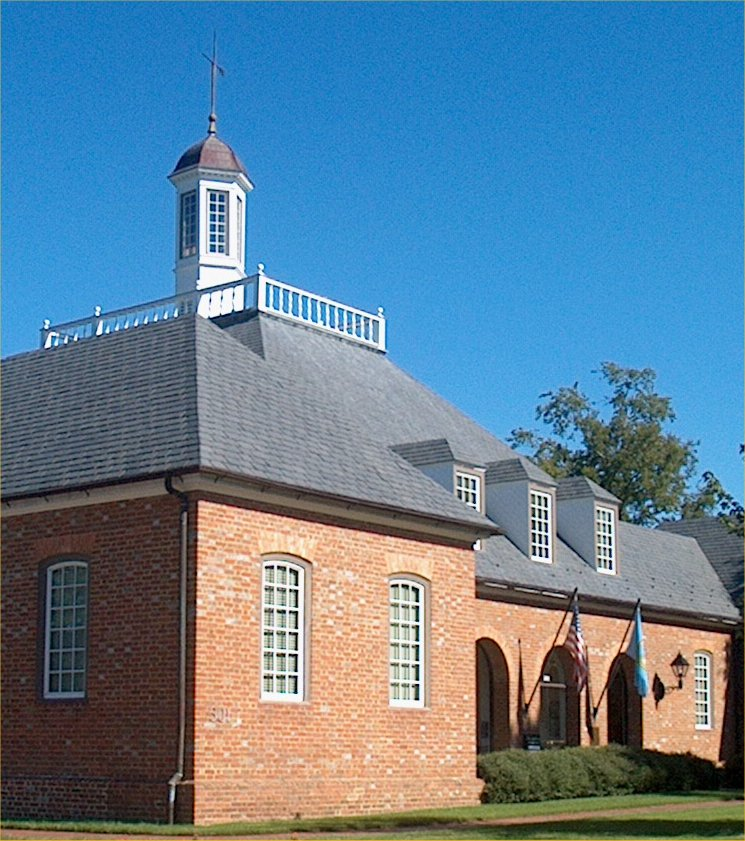
York Hall

The first courthouse and jail were located near what is now Yorktown although the community, founded as a port for shipping tobacco to Europe, as variously called Port of York, Borough of York, York, Town of York, until Yorktown was established in 1691, when the House of Burgesses required each county to designate a port of entry and build warehousing. Although never formally incorporated as a town, Yorktown is the county seat of York County. The only town ever incorporated within the county's boundaries was Poquoson, which was incorporated in 1952 and became an independent city in 1975.

Porto Bello, the hunting lodge of Lord Dunmore, last royal governor of Virginia, still stands on the grounds of Camp Peary. It is listed on the National Register of Historic Places.

It is most famous as the site of the surrender of General Cornwallis to General George Washington in 1781, ending the American Revolutionary War. Yorktown also figured prominently in the American Civil War during the Peninsula Campaign in 1862.

=== Other communities, boundary changes ===
The small unincorporated town of Lackey and a nearby area known as "the Reservation" were taken over by the U.S. Navy during World War I. This is now part of the Naval Weapons Station Yorktown. Many of the displaced African American landowners were eventually relocated to Grove, along the border between York and James counties.

During World War II, the sites of three other small York County towns were absorbed into U.S. government reservations. Penniman was the site of a World War I munitions facility operated by the DuPont company and was made a part of Cheatham Annex) in 1943. To the west of Penniman, which is reported to have had a peak population of 15,000, on land which is now part of Camp Peary, the smaller towns of Magruder and Bigler's Mill were located. Much of Magruder's population and at least one church was relocated to Grove, increasing its population.

In 1949, the county grew by 4 square miles (10 km^{2}), as land in that amount was ceded to York County by neighboring Warwick County. At the time, the move was part of a successful attempt by Warwick County to block an annexation suit brought by the City of Newport News. Warwick eventually consolidated with the city in 1958 by mutual agreement. (The reduction in size allowed Warwick County to claim an exemption from the proposed annexation at the time).

In 1975, the county lost 15.5 square miles (40.1 km^{2}) of land as the incorporated town of Poquoson, which had been within York County, became an independent city, although ties between the county and the new city remained close. Over 40 years later, they continue to share courts, sheriff's office, a jail, and some constitutional services.

York County also adjoins another small independent city, Williamsburg, which was long located within James City County. In the 20th century, some areas of York County adjacent to Williamsburg were lost to the growing small city through annexation.

=== York County in the late 20th and early 21st centuries ===
From the 1980s to modern times, York County experienced a rapid transition from a rural county to a bedroom community for the neighboring core cities of Hampton and Newport News.

In modern times, York County and Yorktown in particular are part of an important historical area of attractions known as the Historic Triangle of Colonial Virginia, which includes Yorktown, Jamestown and Williamsburg. Yorktown is the northern terminus of the scenic Colonial Parkway operated by the U.S. National Park Service which links the three. In 2005, the county completed Riverwalk Landing, a successful pseudo-colonial waterfront development at Yorktown to revitalize the previously deteriorating beach and town district and complement the 2007 celebration of Jamestown.

== Geography ==
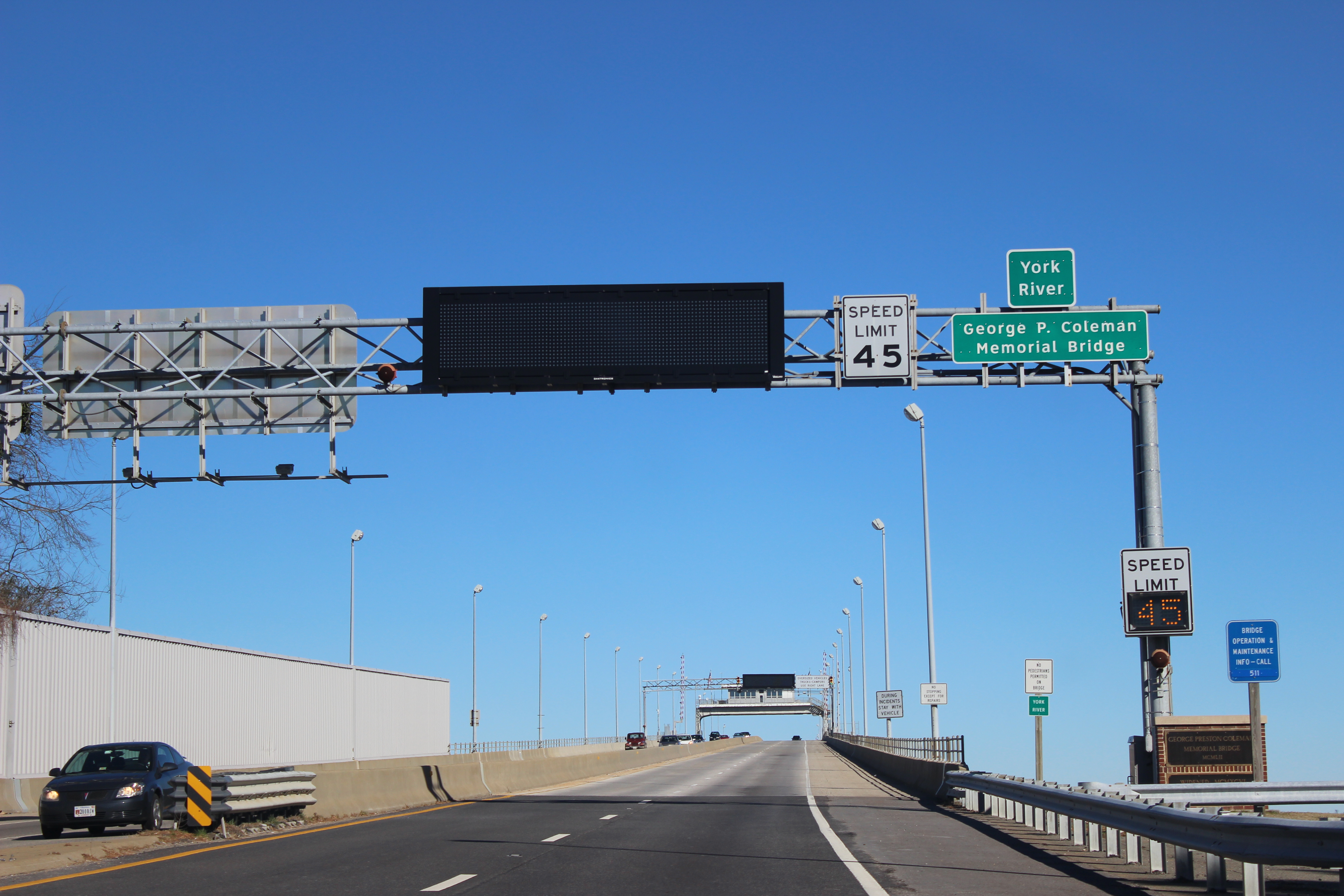
The Coleman Bridge connects York County and neighboring Gloucester County

According to the U.S. Census Bureau, the county has a total area of 215 square miles (560 km^{2}), of which 105 square miles (270 km^{2}) is land and 110 square miles (280 km^{2}) (51.3%) is water. It is the third-smallest county in Virginia by land area. It is near the mouth of the Chesapeake Bay.

Also, in terms of population clusters, the county is divided by a vast expanse of federal land in the midsection of the county, much of which is densely wooded park land, and military training areas. The southern portion of the county is dense with suburban developments and contains the majority of the county's population. There is little room for additional growth in the southern portion of York County because it is a relatively small area and was essentially fully developed by the early 2000s. A small industrial area along the York River just east of Yorktown contains a power plant owned by Dominion Virginia Power, and a petroleum terminal on the former site of an oil refinery that ceased operation in 2010.

The northern portion is more connected with the Williamsburg community than Yorktown and, although less populous than the south, is also fairly dense. Having not seen a significant amount of growth until recently, the northern portion is now seeing the development of new residential communities and shopping areas.

=== Adjacent counties and cities ===
- Gloucester County (north)
- Mathews County (northeast)
- Northampton County (east)
- Poquoson (southeast)
- Hampton (south)
- Newport News (southwest)
- James City County (west)
- Williamsburg (west)

=== National protected area ===
- Colonial National Historical Park (part)

=== Climate ===
Yorktown, VA

Climate chart (precipitation, max. and min. temperature)
J	F	M	A	M	J	J	A	S	O	N	D
3.6 48 28	3.2 52 31	4.3 60 37	3.3 70 45	3.9 77 55	3.5 85 64	4.6 89 68	4.7 87 66	4.2 81 60	3.4 71 48	3.3 62 40	3.4 52 32
- █ Average max. and min. temperatures in °F
- █ Precipitation totals in inches
Metric conversion
J	F	M	A	M	J	J	A	S	O	N	D
91 9 −2	81 11 −1	109 16 3	84 21 7	99 25 13	89 30 18	117 32 20	119 30 19	107 27 15	86 22 9	84 16 4	86 11 0
- █ Average max. and min. temperatures in °C
- █ Precipitation totals in mm

== Demographics ==
Historical population
Census	Pop.	Note	%±
1790	5,233		—
1800	3,231		−38.3%
1810	5,187		60.5%
1820	4,384		−15.5%
1830	5,354		22.1%
1840	4,720		−11.8%
1850	4,460		−5.5%
1860	4,949		11.0%
1870	7,198		45.4%
1880	7,349		2.1%
1890	7,596		3.4%
1900	7,482		−1.5%
1910	7,757		3.7%
1920	8,046		3.7%
1930	7,615		−5.4%
1940	8,857		16.3%
1950	11,750		32.7%
1960	21,583		83.7%
1970	33,203		53.8%
1980	35,463		6.8%
1990	42,422		19.6%
2000	56,297		32.7%
2010	65,464		16.3%
2020	70,045		7.0%
2025 (est.)	71,374	▲	1.9%
U.S. Decennial Census; 1790–1960 1900–1990; 1990–2000 2010–2020

=== Racial and ethnic composition ===
York County, Virginia – Racial and ethnic composition Note: the US Census treats Hispanic/Latino as an ethnic category. This table excludes Latinos from the racial categories and assigns them to a separate category. Hispanics/Latinos may be of any race.
Race / Ethnicity (NH = Non-Hispanic)	Pop 1980	Pop 1990	Pop 2000	Pop 2010	Pop 2020	% 1980	% 1990	% 2000	% 2010	% 2020
White alone (NH)	28,345	34,061	44,218	48,470	46,932	79.93%	80.29%	78.54%	74.04%	67.00%
Black or African American alone (NH)	6,017	6,560	7,445	8,599	8,633	16.97%	15.46%	13.22%	13.14%	12.32%
Native American or Alaska Native alone (NH)	49	100	180	225	168	0.14%	0.24%	0.32%	0.34%	0.24%
Asian alone (NH)	310	951	1,810	3,169	4,251	0.87%	2.24%	3.22%	4.84%	6.07%
Native Hawaiian or Pacific Islander alone (NH)	x	x	61	92	127	x	x	0.11%	0.14%	0.18%
Other race alone (NH)	170	27	102	136	416	0.48%	0.06%	0.18%	0.21%	0.59%
Mixed race or Multiracial (NH)	x	x	972	1,881	4,382	x	x	1.73%	2.87%	6.26%
Hispanic or Latino (any race)	572	723	1,509	2,892	5,136	1.61%	1.70%	2.68%	4.42%	7.33%
Total	35,463	42,422	56,297	65,464	70,045	100.00%	100.00%	100.00%	100.00%	100.00%

=== 2020 census ===
As of the 2020 census, the county had a population of 70,045. The median age was 39.6 years. 24.4% of residents were under the age of 18 and 17.0% of residents were 65 years of age or older. For every 100 females there were 95.3 males, and for every 100 females age 18 and over there were 93.1 males age 18 and over.

The racial makeup of the county was 68.9% White, 12.7% Black or African American, 0.4% American Indian and Alaska Native, 6.1% Asian, 0.2% Native Hawaiian and Pacific Islander, 2.1% from some other race, and 9.5% from two or more races. Hispanic or Latino residents of any race comprised 7.3% of the population.

92.9% of residents lived in urban areas, while 7.1% lived in rural areas.

There were 25,873 households in the county, of which 36.1% had children under the age of 18 living with them and 22.2% had a female householder with no spouse or partner present. About 20.5% of all households were made up of individuals and 9.7% had someone living alone who was 65 years of age or older.

There were 27,827 housing units, of which 7.0% were vacant. Among occupied housing units, 71.1% were owner-occupied and 28.9% were renter-occupied. The homeowner vacancy rate was 1.5% and the rental vacancy rate was 9.1%.

=== 2010 Census ===
As of the census of 2000, there were 56,297 people, 20,000 households, and 15,880 families residing in the county. The population density was 533 inhabitants per square mile (206/km^{2}). There were 20,701 housing units at an average density of 196 units per square mile (76 units/km^{2}). The racial makeup of the county was 76.4% White, 13.4% Black or African American, 0.4% Native American, 4.9% Asian, 0.2% Pacific Islander, 1.4% from other races, and 3.4% from two or more races. 4.4% of the population were Hispanic or Latino of any race.

There were 20,000 households, out of which 42.20% had children under the age of 18 living with them, 67.30% were married couples living together, 9.40% had a female householder with no husband present, and 20.60% were non-families. 16.70% of all households were made up of individuals, and 5.40% had someone living alone who was 65 years of age or older. The average household size was 2.78 and the average family size was 3.15.

In the county, the population was spread out, with 29.10% under the age of 18, 6.60% from 18 to 24, 30.70% from 25 to 44, 24.40% from 45 to 64, and 9.10% who were 65 years of age or older. The median age was 36 years. For every 100 females there were 96.50 males. For every 100 females aged 18 and over, there were 93.50 males.

As of the 2010 Census, the population had grown to 65,464 and the median household income was $84,167, the highest in the Hampton Roads region. Males had a median income of $42,948 versus $28,713 for females. The per capita income for the county was $36,755. About 2.70% of families and 3.50% of the population were below the poverty line, including 3.90% of those under age 18 and 3.80% of those age 65 or over.

== Transportation ==
=== Public transportation ===
York County is served by Williamsburg Area Transit Authority (WATA) as well as Hampton Roads Transit (HRT). WATA's buses stop at different communities in the northwestern part of the county adjacent to Williamsburg, while HRT operates several routes that run close to the county's populated southeast (but not entering the county). In addition, Yorktown offers a complimentary sightseeing trolley bus around the town on a daily basis.

There is no train station in York County. The closest Amtrak stations are in Williamsburg and Newport News, respectively. Greyhound also has services in these two cities.

A section of Newport News/Williamsburg International Airport, the only regional airport on the southern tip of the peninsula, is located in York County. Other major airports in the region are Norfolk International Airport and Richmond International Airport.

=== Highways ===
The only interstate highway in the county is Interstate 64. U.S. Route 17 crosses the York River from Gloucester Point via the Coleman Memorial Bridge. State Route 199, which circumvents Williamsburg, joins Interstate 64 close to the Water Country USA in the county. Two sections of U.S. Routes 60 passes York County to the north of Williamsburg and west of Water Country USA. Virginia State Route 134 connects York County to Langley Air Force Base and Hampton, Virginia, bypassing the more developed portion of US-17 between Tabb and I-64. Victory Boulevard connects Newport News and York County to Poquoson.

== Communities ==
=== Census-designated places ===
- Bethel Manor
- Yorktown

=== Other unincorporated communities ===
- Dare
- Grafton
- Lackey
- Lightfoot
- Seaford
- Tabb

== Government ==
The county is traditionally organized per Virginia Law. It is governed by a Board of Supervisors, who are elected for four-year terms by voters from each of the county's five districts. The Board appoints a County Administrator to act as the administrative head of the county. The current county administrator is Neil Morgan.

=== York County Board of Supervisors ===
- District 1: Douglas R. Holroyd (Vice Chairman)
- District 2: Sheila S. Noll (Chairwoman)
- District 3: Wayne Drewry
- District 4: G. Stephen Roane Jr.
- District 5: Thomas G. Shepperd Jr.

=== York County School Board ===
- District 1: Mark J. Shafer
- District 2: Zoran Pajevic
- District 3: Kimberly S. Goodwin (Chairwoman)
- District 4: James E. Richardson (Vice Chairman)
- District 5: Lynda J. Fairman

=== Other elected officials ===
- Sheriff: Ron Montgomery
- Commonwealth's Attorney: Krystyn Reid
- Circuit Court Clerk: Kristen N. Nelson
- Commissioner of the Revenue: Sarah K. Webb
- Treasurer: Candice D. Kelley

=== Politics ===
York County generally votes for Republican candidates in statewide elections, though the county has recently become less strongly Republican. The county voted for Republican Herbert Hoover in 1928 in a landslide. This indicates that York County is almost entirely Protestant, and reacted poorly to Catholic Democrat Al Smith's candidacy in 1928.

Since 1968, only three Democratic candidates have won more than 45% of the vote: Jimmy Carter in 1976, Joe Biden in 2020, and Kamala Harris in 2024. Harris won 46% of the vote in the county, the highest percentage since 1964.

Mark Warner carried York County in his 2008 election to the U.S. Senate and his 2026 reelection. In 2025, Abigail Spanberger won a majority of the vote in the county, although Republican candidates carried it in the lieutenant gubernatorial and attorney general elections.

United States presidential election results for York County, Virginia
Year	Republican		Democratic		Third party(ies)	
Year	No.	%	No.	%	No.	%
1912	34	12.27%	211	76.17%	32	11.55%
1916	51	17.11%	247	82.89%	0	0.00%
1920	92	24.40%	281	74.54%	4	1.06%
1924	75	18.99%	305	77.22%	15	3.80%
1928	642	76.79%	194	23.21%	0	0.00%
1932	309	38.43%	457	56.84%	38	4.73%
1936	228	23.08%	729	73.79%	31	3.14%
1940	177	18.06%	787	80.31%	16	1.63%
1944	318	29.01%	760	69.34%	18	1.64%
1948	418	30.38%	826	60.03%	132	9.59%
1952	1,335	50.53%	1,287	48.71%	20	0.76%
1956	1,759	60.10%	1,064	36.35%	104	3.55%
1960	2,085	54.94%	1,691	44.56%	19	0.50%
1964	2,992	46.83%	3,385	52.98%	12	0.19%
1968	3,356	36.93%	2,370	26.08%	3,362	36.99%
1972	7,745	74.90%	2,302	22.26%	294	2.84%
1976	5,603	53.61%	4,736	45.32%	112	1.07%
1980	6,744	55.58%	4,532	37.35%	857	7.06%
1984	10,214	71.24%	4,063	28.34%	60	0.42%
1988	11,103	69.96%	4,639	29.23%	129	0.81%
1992	10,197	51.07%	6,218	31.14%	3,551	17.79%
1996	11,396	54.95%	7,731	37.28%	1,611	7.77%
2000	15,312	62.29%	8,622	35.07%	649	2.64%
2004	19,396	64.91%	10,276	34.39%	208	0.70%
2008	19,833	58.51%	13,700	40.42%	364	1.07%
2012	20,204	59.51%	13,183	38.83%	566	1.67%
2016	18,837	55.21%	12,999	38.10%	2,282	6.69%
2020	20,241	52.19%	17,683	45.59%	863	2.22%
2024	20,722	52.13%	18,296	46.03%	731	1.84%

== Education ==
York County School Division is the sole school district in the county.

=== Elementary schools ===
- Bethel Manor ES
- Coventry ES
- Dare ES
- Grafton Bethel ES
- Magruder ES
- Mt. Vernon ES
- Seaford ES
- Tabb ES
- Waller Mill ES
- Yorktown ES
- Extend Center (Dare Elementary)

=== Middle schools ===
- Grafton MS (connected to Grafton High School)
- Queens Lake MS
- Tabb MS
- Yorktown MS

=== High schools ===
- Bruton HS
- Grafton HS (connected to Grafton Middle School)
- Tabb HS
- York HS
- York River Academy
- Virtual High School

== Military bases ==
York County is home to several large and important military facilities of the United States. Located along the York River, small portions of each base extend into adjacent James City County as well.

The Coast Guard Training Center Yorktown is there.

The Naval Weapons Station Yorktown was originally established during World War I by order of President Woodrow Wilson, and now includes the formerly separate Cheatham Annex Supply Complex. Camp Peary was established during World War II as a Seabee Training Base. As the war progressed, it became valuable to the Allied Forces to house sensitive prisoners-of-war from captured German naval vessels; it was important for Nazi authorities to be unaware of their capture, since that also meant secret code books thought lost-at sea may also have been compromised. Many of these POWs made Virginia and the United States their new homeland after the War. Separating these two large military reservations is Queen's Creek, which originates in the western reaches of the county and drains to the York River.

York County contains some former towns including Yorke, and a large number when the military reservations were created in the first half of the 20th century. These include the original Lackey (known locally as "the Reservation"), Halstead's Point, Penniman, Bigler's Mill, and Magruder. Many relocated residents and their descendants, many of whom were farmers and watermen, now live in such places as Yorktown, Gloucester, Lee Hall, Grove, and Lightfoot.

== See also ==
- National Register of Historic Places listings in York County, Virginia
- Moore House (Yorktown, Virginia)
- Kiskiack (Lee House)
- William Gooch Tomb and York Village Archeological Site

== Sources ==
=== Publications ===
- McCartney, Martha W. (1977) James City County: Keystone of the Commonwealth; James City County, Virginia; Donning and Company; ISBN 0-89865-999-X
