= Penniman, Virginia =

Unincorporated town in Virginia, US

Coordinates: 37°17′24″N 76°37′17″W

Penniman was an unincorporated town in northwestern York County, Virginia, on the south bank of the York River six miles (9.7 km) northeast of Williamsburg. This was on the Virginia Peninsula and near the Hampton Roads region of southeastern Virginia in the United States.

A plant and company town were developed by E.I. DuPont Nemours Company originally to manufacture TNT. It was named for Russell Sylvanus Penniman, an American chemist who in 1885, invented ammonia dynamite.

As part of the World War I war efforts, Penniman was converted to other use in support of the U.S. Navy, which acquired property for Mine Depot, Yorktown. The Penniman plant was built to employ 10,000 persons. Housing for 15,000 was built in the new development. The Navy installation was largely abandoned after 1919, and the few residents in the area farmed after World War I.

With tensions rising during World War II, the property was returned to military use less than 25 years later. The area including Penniman was taken over by the military and developed as a Navy facility known as Cheatham Annex. It later became part of the adjacent Naval Weapons Station Yorktown, access to which is restricted.

== History ==
Prior to World War I, the area was lightly populated and used primarily as farmland. Freedmen and their descendants had farmed in this area since after the Civil War.

=== World War I ===
In 1916, the E.I. DuPont Nemours company announced that it would develop a large black powder and shell-loading plant facility six miles northeast of Williamsburg in York County. The publicity department of the DuPont Powder Company, Wilmington, Delaware estimated that there would possibly be about 200 men employed at the new powder plant. The plant as built was large enough to have 10,000 employees.

The new plant and the new town for the workers and families were named Penniman, in honor of Russell Sylvanus Penniman, an American chemist who is credited with the invention of ammonia dynamite in 1885, a safer form than the nitroglycerin used with Alfred Nobel's original formulation. At its peak, Penniman had housing for 15,000, and included dormitories, a store, a post office, bank, police station, church, YWCA, YMCA, Mess Halls canteen, and a hospital. The York County Chapter of the American Red Cross began its initial activities in support of the Dupont Factory and residents of Penniman.

In the fall of 1916, the first unit of the plant at Penniman was completed. Commonly known as the Penniman Plant or as Plant No.37, the high wages paid at the plant attracted workers from the surrounding area. Farmers were greatly handicapped in putting in their crops owing to the exodus of farm labor to the munition plants. Rents and food prices rose in the area with the influx of population.

Penniman's factories offered high salaries, which attracted people from all over the country to work there. The town's population grew to 20,000 people, with 10,000 of them working in the factories. Because of the shortage of men due to their presence overseas, many women began to take up the role of factory workers. In Penniman, and many ammunition factories, the typical job was loading TNT into artillery shells. Canary Girls was the title given to the women who began to show symptoms of talcum poisoning from inhaling the powders of TNT.

The Chesapeake and Ohio Railway (C&O) built a spur track on the Peninsula Subdivision from a point about 2 miles (3.2 km) east of Williamsburg (mp 33) to the York River site. The C&O depot was to be used for the DuPont station, which opened on June 1, 1916. In July 1916, the Williamsburg Chamber of Commerce requested the C&O establish passenger train service between the city and Penniman. By the fall of 1918, Penniman was a town of about 15,000 inhabitants; three passenger trains a day passed each way between Williamsburg and Penniman.

=== Between the wars ===
In November 1918, the armistice which ended World War I was signed, which meant the end of need for the ammunitions plant. The village eventually deteriorated and closed. For a while after World War I, Penniman was used for demilitarization activities. The workers of Penniman left when the jobs ended after what everyone called "the Great War." By June 1919, population of Penniman was estimated at fewer than 100. DuPont dismantled most of its equipment and facilities.

During the approximately 20 years between 1923 and 1943, the land was in private ownership and was used for farming or left idle.

=== World War II: Cheatham Annex ===
During World War II, in 1942, the U.S. Navy condemned more than 3,000 acres (12 km^{2}) along the York River to establish Cheatham Annex. Much of the condemned property was part of Penniman. The land was placed into war use again, this time as government-owned storage and shipping facility for the U.S. Navy. Cheatham Annex was commissioned in June 1943 as a satellite unit of the Naval Supply Depot in Norfolk, Virginia to provide bulk storage facilities in the Hampton Roads area. The supplies handled there included bulk storage of gasoline, diesel and other fuels. The rural location was also used to dispose of toxic waste such as medical materials from Navy ships.

=== After World War II ===
Cheatham Annex continued as a Navy supply depot after World War II. A portion of the bulk fuel storage facilities was transferred by the federal government to the Commonwealth of Virginia for use during the domestic fuel crisis periods of the 1970s. Due to extensive pollution, this turned out to be a bad deal for the state. A portion of the former Penniman site was transferred to the National Park Service in 1979 and was added to the Colonial National Historical Park. The bucolic and historic Colonial Parkway is a prominent feature of this park.

In 1998, oversight of the remaining Cheatham Annex facility was shifted to the adjacent Naval Weapons Station Yorktown. In 2000, a portion of the Cheatham Annex complex was designated by the U.S. Environmental Protection Agency as a Superfund cleanup site.

== Legacy ==
As of 2007, the remaining portion of the site of the lost town of Penniman on the Cheatham Annex property is bordered to the northwest by Camp Peary, which is reportedly a Central Intelligence Agency (CIA) training facility often referred as "The Farm." In circumstances similar to the acquisition of Penniman, the government takeover of the land into a military facility consumed two other towns, Magruder, and Bigler's Mill. Their populations were relocated and parts of the villages were redeveloped. Access to all these areas is restricted.

To the south of the military reservations, extending from State Route 199 just north of Interstate 64 toward Williamsburg, Penniman Road still largely follows the northern portion of the Old Williamsburg Road which led from Yorktown to the old colonial capital city. It passes through the Naval Weapons Station and Cheatham Annex property. Near Fort Magruder, the centerpiece of the Williamsburg Line of defensive works during the American Civil War, Penniman Road forms a border of James City and York counties, crossing the much newer Merrimack Trail as it winds its way into the city limits of Williamsburg, ending near Second Street and Page Street.

== Sources ==
=== Sources ===
- McCartney, Martha W. (1977) James City County: Keystone of the Commonwealth; James City County, Virginia; Donning and Company; ISBN 0-89865-999-X
- Bradley M. McDonald, Kenneth E. Stuck, and Kathleen J. Bragdon, "Cast Down Your Bucket Where You Are": An Ethnohistorical Study of the African-American Community on the Lands of the Yorktown Naval Weapons Station, 1865–1918, 1992. William and Mary College Occasional Papers in Archaeology, full text online at HathiTrust.

In 2017, a definitive history of Penniman, carefully researched and fully illustrated, was published by Rosemary Thornton: Penniman: Virginia's Own Ghost City, (Portsmouth, VA: Gentle Beam Publications).
