= Charles River Shire =

Shire of Virginia in the Virginia Colony

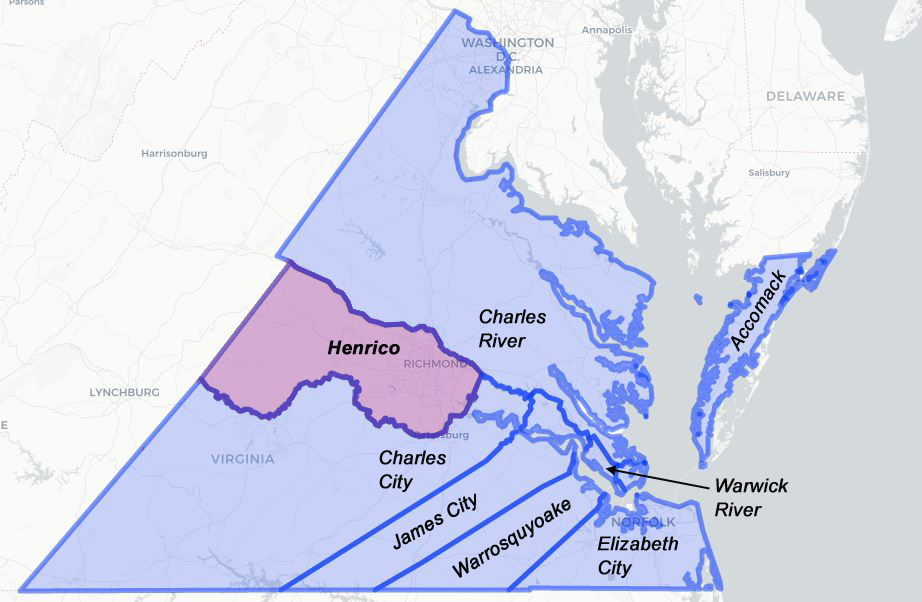
Map of the shires of Virginia, 1634

Charles River Shire was one of eight shires of Virginia created in the Virginia Colony in 1634.

During the 17th century, shortly after establishment of Jamestown, Virginia in 1607, English settlers explored and began settling the areas adjacent to Hampton Roads. By 1634, the English colony of Virginia consisted of eight shires or counties with a total population of approximately 5,000 inhabitants.

Charles River Shire took its name from King Charles I of England. It was located on the Virginia Peninsula on the Charles River (also named for the younger son of King James I. During the English Civil War, Charles River County and the Charles River were changed to York County and York River, respectively. The river, county, and town of Yorktown are believed to have been named for York, a city in Northern England.

Charles River Shire became York County in 1643. The first courthouse and jail were located near what is now Yorktown although the community, founded as a port for shipping tobacco to Europe, as variously called Port of York, Borough of York, York, Town of York, until Yorktown was established in 1691. Never incorporated as a town, Yorktown is the county seat of York County.

The Chiskiack Tribe of Native Americans lived on the south side of the York River on the grounds of the present-day Naval Weapons Station Yorktown near Yorktown until the 1630s, when conflicts with the English colonists caused them to move.

Charles River Shire (and York County) were the antecedents of dozens of counties and cities in Virginia and West Virginia due to the way the original boundaries were defined.

It is one of the five original shires of Virginia considered extant in the original form almost 400 years later, making it one of the oldest counties in the United States.

== See also ==
- List of former United States counties
