= James City Shire =

17th century Virginia Company shire

Coordinates: 37°12′N 76°47′W

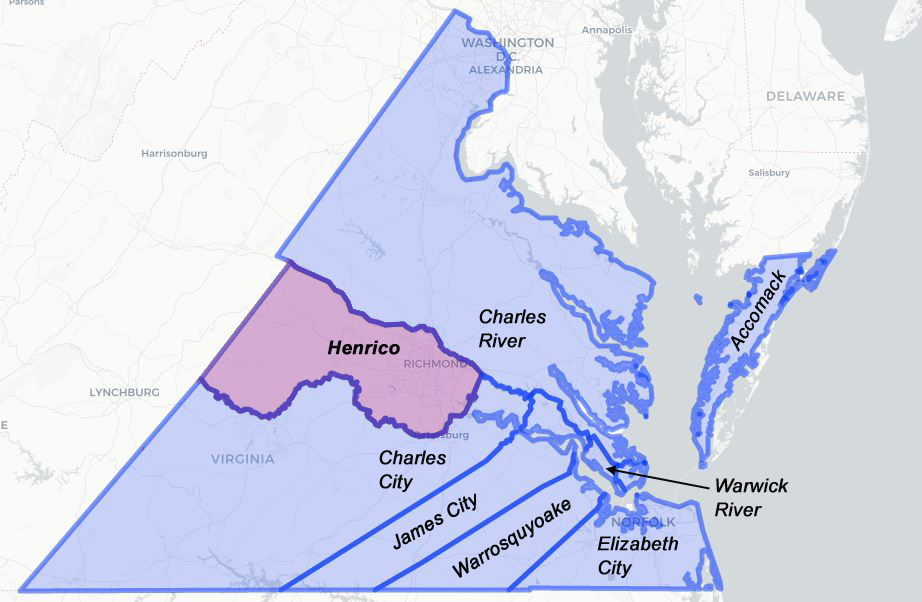
Map of the shires of Virginia, 1634

James City Shire was formed in the British colony of Virginia in 1634.

During the 17th century, shortly after establishment of Jamestown in 1607, English settlers explored and began settling the areas adjacent to Hampton Roads.

On, November 18, 1618, the Virginia Company of London, proprietor of the colony, gave instructions on the formation of a laudable government for the Colony to Sir George Yeardley when he departed from London to become full governor of Virginia. As directed, in 1619, Governor Yeardly established four large corporations, termed citties (sic), which were designated to encompass the developed portion of the colony. These were Kecoughtan (later renamed Elizabeth Cittie), James Cittie, Charles Cittie, and Henrico Cittie.

In 1634, by order of Charles I, King of England, eight shires or counties with a total population of approximately 5,000 inhabitants were established in the colony of Virginia. The area included what is now Surry County (across the James River), part of Charles City County and some of New Kent County.

James City Shire, as well as the James River and Jamestown took their name from King James I, the late father of the king. About 1642-43, the name of the James City Shire was changed to James City County. It is considered one of the 5 original shires of the Virginia colony to be extant essentially in the same political form (county) in 2005.

Williamsburg became an independent city from James City County in 1884. However they share a school system, courts, and some constitutional officers.
