= Bigler's Mill, Virginia =

Human settlement in Virginia, United States of America

Coordinates: 37°20′11″N 76°38′44″W

Bigler's Mill was a small town in Virginia near Williamsburg in York County which is now extinct. It is considered one of the many lost towns of Virginia. The original community on this site was founded by James Bigler in the spring of 1852, who purchased 2400 acres of timberland, part of the tract known as Rippon Hall. He built a sawmill and gristmill with a long pier extending into the York River. A series of homes, a store and church were also constructed. During the Peninsula Campaign of the Civil War, the property was occupied by Confederate forces; in May 1862, Federal gunboats shelled the mill and set fire to the buildings and the pier, for which Bigler was later compensated.

After the war, a new community grew up along the river based on oyster planting and harvesting. In this practice, seed oysters were gathered from rocky river bottoms, mostly in the James River, and planted in the muddier York River. The right to plant and harvest sections of the riverbed was leased from the state, and leaseholds were transferable, a system that provided some measure of protection from overfishing, and prosperity for the lease owners.

During World War II, the U.S. Navy took over a large area in the north-western portion of York County, which was developed as Camp Peary. All residents of the entire towns of Bigler's Mill and nearby Magruder were removed, and many of the areas were redeveloped.

Camp Peary later became well known as "The Farm," a training facility for the U.S. Central Intelligence Agency (CIA). Access to the base is restricted. The 100-acre (400,000 m^{2}) Biglers Millpond occupies the site adjacent to the York River.

== See also ==
- Penniman, Virginia
- Former counties, cities, and towns of Virginia
- List of ghost towns in Virginia
