= Lackey, Virginia =

Former unincorporated community in York County, Virginia, US

Coordinates: 37°13′52″N 76°33′10″W

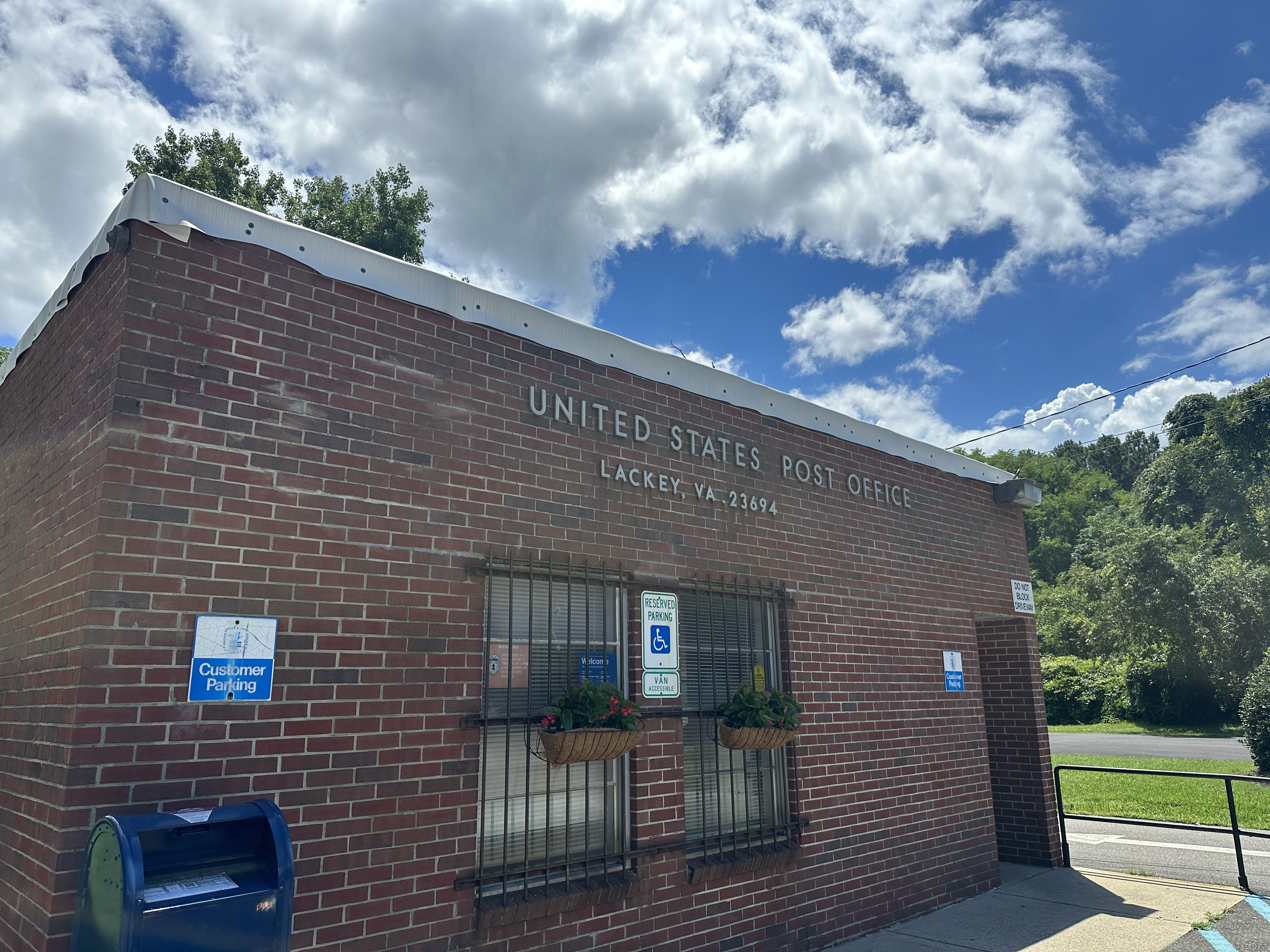
Lackey Post Office

Lackey (also known locally in its heyday as "the Reservation") was a small unincorporated community near Yorktown in York County, Virginia, United States, established primarily after the Civil War. Lackey is now extinct as the properties were bought by the federal government in 1918 for use as a naval military installation.

== History ==
Evidence from an oral history study suggests there was a small free people of color community in this area before the Civil War. Free African American families were established primarily by unions between white slave owners and African or African-American women during the colonial period, when the working class lived and worked together.

From 1860 to 1870, the black population in York County doubled, due to slaves escaping to Union lines. The total population in the county was majority black, with a portion having gained freedom before the war. After the war, a number of freedmen remained, settling in and near what became called "the reservation" and then Lackey, along the Yorktown-Williamsburg Road. Several hundred African-American families lived here by the turn of the 20th century. They worked in farming and/or (and sometimes both) as fishermen and oystermen in the local waters.

During World War I, the properties of many primarily African-American landowners along the former Yorktown-Williamsburg Road were taken to create a military reservation now known as Naval Weapons Station Yorktown. Oral histories indicate that as many as 60 African-American families were displaced by the Navy, and many of these were said to own their land. Three churches also had to vacate the desired land. Assisted by self-educated farmer John Tack Roberts (born approximately 1860), who studied law and became a magistrate, many of the displaced residents of Lackey were able to obtain financial compensation from the government for their property. A number relocated to the community of Grove in nearby James City County. Others moved to Williamsburg, or Lee Hall. Many were unable to buy comparable areas with their compensation, and turned from farming to other trades.

Another small community, also named Lackey, was later developed along the Yorktown Road a few miles away. However, the original Lackey is now considered extinct and one of the many lost towns of Virginia.

== See also ==
- List of ghost towns in Virginia
