= Camp Wallace =

United States Army facility in Virginia

Coordinates: 37°13′30.2″N 76°37′56.7″W

Camp Wallace was a facility of the United States Army located near the unincorporated town of Grove in southeastern James City County in the Virginia Peninsula portion of the Hampton Roads region of Virginia in the United States.

Camp Wallace served from 1918 to 1971 as a satellite facility of the army base which became Fort Eustis. It was the first station of the Army's aerial tramway before it was moved to Fort Eustis in 1956.

== Camp Abraham Eustis ==
During World War I, Camp Abraham Eustis was established by the United States Army in Warwick County, Virginia, in 1918. It encompassed historic Mulberry Island. In 1923, the Camp became Fort Eustis. The former Warwick County consolidated to become a part of the independent city of Newport News in 1958. Fort Eustis, near the southwestern edge of the city just east of the Lee Hall community, which remains as an important U.S. Army base in the 21st century.

== An outpost upriver ==
A few miles upstream along the James River from the Warwick River and Mulberry Island, a satellite facility, Camp Wallace, was established in 1918 as the Upper Firing Range for artillery training. Camp Wallace had 30 66-man barracks, six storehouses, and eight mess halls, along with sewage, electricity, and a water system. it was located on 160 acres (0.6 km^{2}) on the edge of Grove, west of Carter's Grove Plantation, south of U.S. Route 60, and east of the old Kingsmill Plantation in nearby James City County.

Camp Wallace included some rugged terrain and bluffs overlooking the river. It was the site of anti-aircraft training during World War II. Many years later, the Army's aerial tramway was first erected at Camp Wallace and later moved to Fort Eustis near the Reserve Fleet for further testing. The purpose of the tramway was to provide cargo movement from ship-to-shore, shore-to-ship, and overland. The tramway supplemented beach and pier operations, used unloading points deemed unusable due to inadequate or non-navigable waters, or to traverse land that was otherwise impassable.

== Conversions: a land swap ==
In 1971, the U.S. Army agreed to a land swap with Anheuser-Busch in return for a larger parcel which is located directly across Skiffe's Creek from Fort Eustis. Along with land previously owned by Colonial Williamsburg, the former Camp Wallace land became part of a massive development. Nearby, the Busch Gardens Williamsburg theme park opened in 1975, as well as a large brewery, and the Kingsmill Resort. Busch Gardens Williamsburg also named a railroad crossing after Camp Wallace on the Busch Gardens Railway.

== Remnants of military use ==
In October 2009, the Virginia Gazette reported that the U.S. Army Corps of Engineers study of possible remaining problems with ordnance ground pollution was posted in the Williamsburg Regional Library and two public hearings were scheduled. According to the news reports, "The Corps has deemed the hazards 'critical' and assigned a high rating of probable danger.

Past and ongoing current development of housing in Kingmill has included areas where problems may exist, although there is not a consensus on either the degree of problems or appropriate remediation.
