= Grove, Virginia =

Unincorporated community in Virginia, US

Coordinates: 37.23°N 76.63°W

Grove and Grove Station on the C&O Railway located in southeastern James City County, Virginia as shown on 1895 map

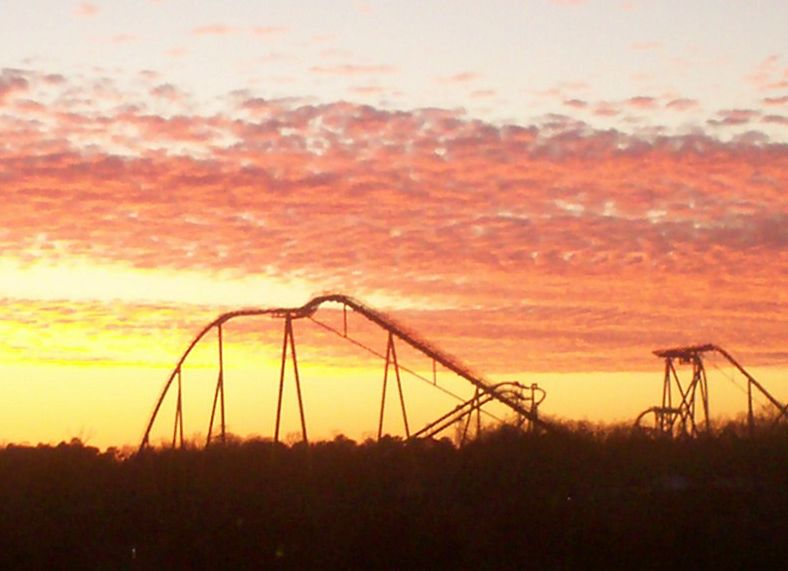
On the western edge of Grove, a winter sunset silhouettes several of the roller coasters at the Busch Gardens Williamsburg theme park.

Grove is an unincorporated community in the southeastern portion of James City County in the Virginia Peninsula subregion of Virginia, United States. It is located in the center of the Historic Triangle of Colonial Virginia, communities linked by the Colonial Parkway. This area is one of the busiest tourist destinations in the world.

Grove is located approximately 7 miles (11 km) east of Williamsburg along U.S. Route 60. Grove is bordered by the James River and separated from the Newport News city limits near Lee Hall by Skiffe's Creek.

Historic places in Grove related to Virginia colonial past include the archaeological site of Wolstenholme Towne, the administrative center of Martin's Hundred. It was rediscovered in 1976 on the grounds of Carter's Grove Plantation, built in 1755. The plantation was occupied by private owners through the 1960s. It was owned and operated by the Colonial Williamsburg Foundation and open to the public from the 1970s until 2003. In 2007 the property was sold back into private ownership.

Grove's contemporary development began with African-American settlement by freedmen from Carter's Grove and other plantations following the Civil War. Its population was fewer than 100 people until after the turn of the twentieth century. During the two World Wars, Grove increased markedly in population; in part, this was due to attracting hundreds of displaced people, mostly African American, who were uprooted by federal land acquisition for major waterfront military installations in nearby James City and York counties. Navy bases established were the Naval Weapons Station Yorktown, the Cheatham Annex supply complex, and Camp Peary.

As of early 2008, many new homes were under construction in Grove. Along the southeastern edge, available sites and frontage on the James River and Skiffe's Creek are zoned for industrial purposes. These have been attractive to developers of new and expanded businesses.

== Geography ==
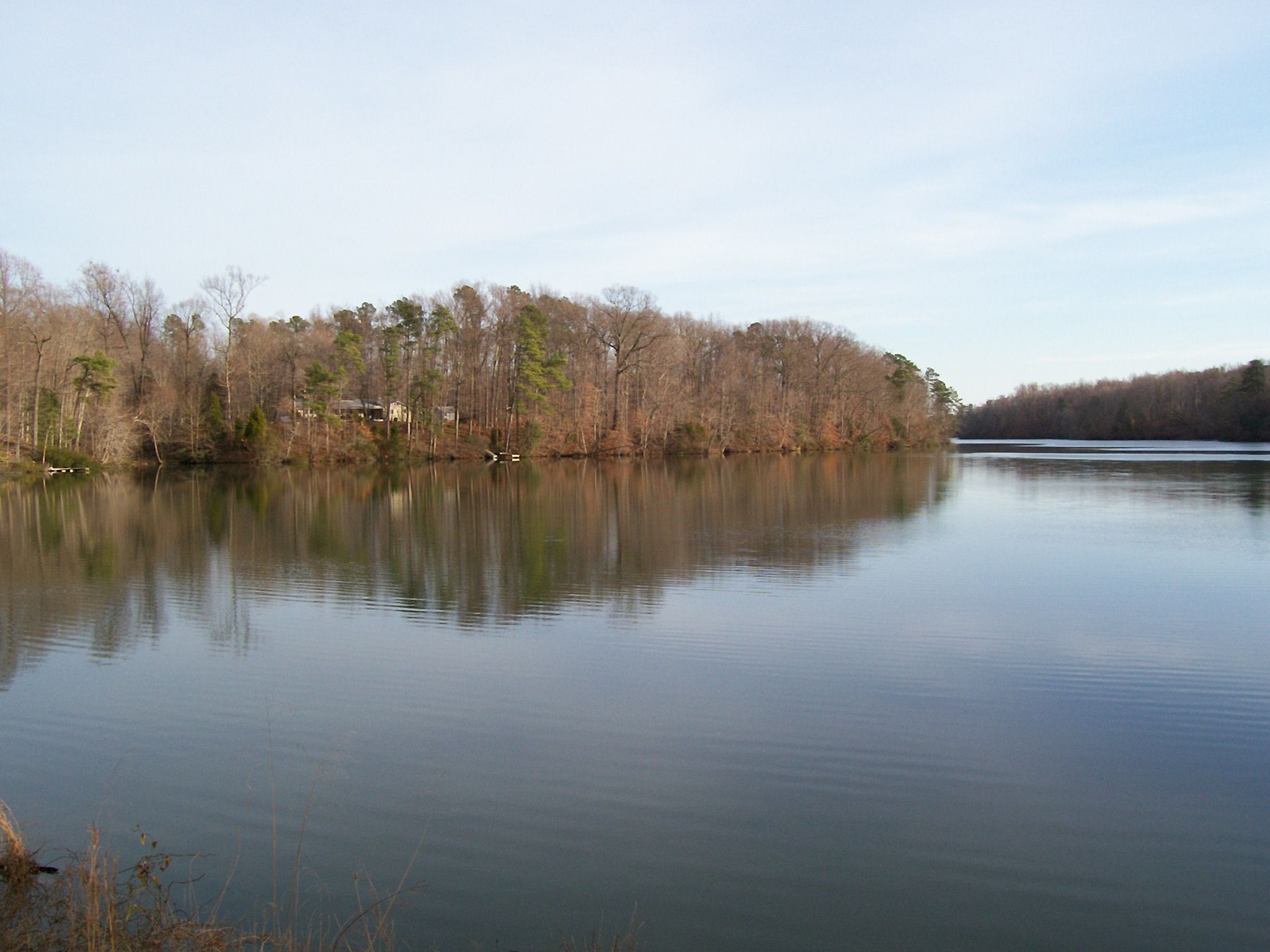
Skiffe's Creek Reservoir of the Newport News Waterworks, located at the historic 1634 border of James City County and the former Warwick County

Grove occupies part of the narrowest portion of James City County, bordering the James River to the south and York County to the north. With the exception of lowlands near the river, most of Grove was originally heavily wooded and remains so today.

Grove Creek and Skiffe's Creek, each tributaries of the James River, provide local drainage. The latter also constitutes the eastern border of Grove (and the county), which adjoins the Lee Hall area of the independent city of Newport News.

The former Chesapeake and Ohio Railway (C&O) runs along the northern edge of Grove. It is now part of the Peninsula Subdivision of CSX Transportation.

== Early history: 17th through 19th centuries ==
=== Native Americans ===
For thousands of years, various cultures of indigenous peoples occupied areas along the waterways. Prior to the arrival of Spanish and English settlers in the 16th and 17th centuries, they were semi-nomadic hunter-gatherers, although more complex civilizations arose among the Mississippian culture. Scholars believe a major historic American Indian village is located somewhere nearby, although the site has not been identified. The site of the historic Kiskiack Indian village, Chiskiack, was a few miles to the north. The Kiskiack were one of a number of Algonquian-speaking historic tribes at the time of encounter with the English.

When the English settlers established Jamestown in 1607, the Powhatan Confederacy included most Native tribes in the area. There were a few that were unaffiliated. Their leader, titled the Mamanatowick, Powhatan, had created a powerful Confederacy in the late 16th and early 17th centuries. He conquered or affiliated by agreement with approximately 30 tribes whose territory covered much of southeastern Virginia. This was called Tenakomakah. A capital of this confederacy, Werowocomoco, was located near the north bank of the York River in present-day Gloucester County, about 15 miles (24 km) as the crow flies from Grove.

By the mid-17th century, the English had forced Native Americans remaining in the area on to reservations north of the York River. By working and living together, some had assimilated into the general population of European colonists and freed slaves of African heritage. Over the decades, white indentured servant women, African men, and few Indians married and created free mixed-race populations before the American Revolution.

=== Martin's Hundred, Wolstenholme Towne ===
Initially, the English of the Virginia Company of London chose Jamestown for their first settlement of the Virginia Colony. They arrived in 1607 in a fleet of three ships commanded by Christopher Newport. (See main article Jamestown, Virginia) After five difficult years, the new colony gradually began expanding. Settlers established plantations along the James River, largely to grow non-native strains of tobacco. This was introduced and successfully exported in 1612 by colonist John Rolfe, who later married Pocahontas, daughter of the Powhatan.

About 7 miles (11 km) downstream from Jamestown on the north bank of the river, just east of Grove Creek, the Grove area was originally settled by English colonists in 1618 as part of Martin's Hundred. The proprietary plantation of over 20,000 acres (80 km^{2}) was an enterprise of the Martin's Hundred Society, a London-based investment group operating under the auspices of the Virginia Company of London. Not far from the riverfront, the new Wolstenholme Towne, the Martin's Hundred administrative center, was established.

Most of the population of Wolstenholme Towne was killed in the Indian massacre of 1622, one of the largest incidents of loss of life by Virginia settlers during the colonial years. Colonists rebuilt the settlement a few years later, and protected it by a cross-peninsula palisade to the west completed in 1634. They abandoned Wolstenholme Towne around 1643 after Williamsburg was made the capital. The structures fell into ruin and the site became taken over by vegetation; it was lost until 1976 (see below).

Martin's Hundred Parish Church was established by the Church of England, and served the area including Wolstenholme Towne. It was later combined with Yorkhampton Parish in adjacent York County.

=== Royal colony, creation of shires (counties) ===
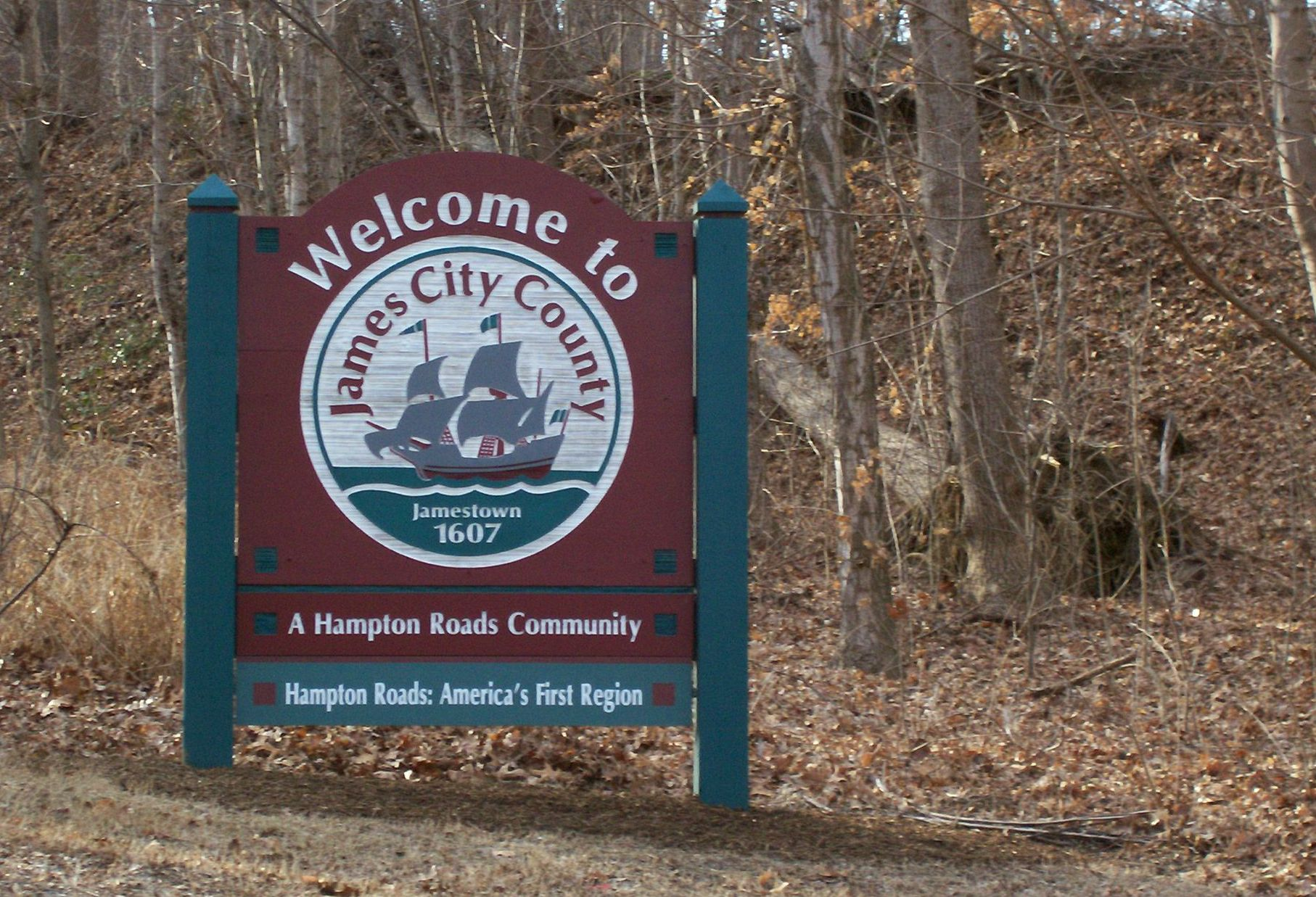
James City County welcoming sign on U.S. Route 60 entering Grove from east at Skiffe's Creek. This border with the former Warwick County was established in 1634 by order of King Charles I of England. Warwick County became part of the City of Newport News in 1958.

When the privately owned Virginia Company lost its charter in 1624, Virginia became a royal colony. In 1634, the English Crown created eight shires (i.e., counties) in the colony of Virginia, which then had a total population of approximately 5,000 inhabitants. James City Shire, as well as the James River and Jamestown, took its name from King James I, the father of the then-king, Charles I. About 1642–43, the name of the James City Shire was changed to James City County.

=== Slavery, freedom ===
James City County received the first slaves whom the English imported to Virginia. Beginning in 1619, the English brought Africans to the colony as indentured servants. Increasingly toward the end of the 17th century, they hardened the labor system to create a racial caste of slavery for African workers and their families. Dutch and British ships transported large numbers of slaves from Africa to the Virginia Colony. On the labor-intensives tobacco plantations, planters replaced indentured laborers with slaves, who also served as household and skilled workers. In the later 17th and 18th centuries, economic conditions improved in England, so the supply of indentured laborers decreased.

Early Africans became free after serving their period of indenture. Some individual slaves were freed as early as the mid-17th century by manumission. Some earned their freedom by separate labor, and others escaped. By far the greatest number of free African-American families in Virginia during colonial times were formed by marriage and unions between white working-class women and African men, whether indentured servant, slave or free. The children and their descendants were free because they had the status of the white mother, under the principle of partus sequitur ventrem, which Virginia had adopted into law in 1662.

Known as free Negroes or free people of color, some of the people stayed in the area. Others migrated to urban or frontier areas away from the plantation areas where racial strictures were more severe. Richmond, which was an economic center, and Petersburg, which had industrial jobs, became early centers of free blacks in Virginia.

There was mass emancipation of slaves during the years of the American Civil War (1861–1865). Despite Virginia's secession from the Union in 1861, the US Army retained control of Fort Monroe at the eastern end of the Virginia Peninsula. It became a destination for slaves seeking freedom behind Union lines. By 1863, many heard President Lincoln's Emancipation Proclamation read under the Emancipation Oak. This tree is now within the grounds of Hampton University, a historically black college established soon after the war.

After the War, many freedmen settled in inland areas of the Peninsula, either as landowners, tenant farmers, or renters who worked as watermen. While the southern side of the peninsula along the James River had long been occupied by large plantations, the northern side along the York River, west of Yorktown, had not been as heavily developed. Many freedmen moved into this area, establishing close-knit communities in mixed towns, as well as majority-black towns such as Lackey and Magruder.

=== Carter's Grove ===
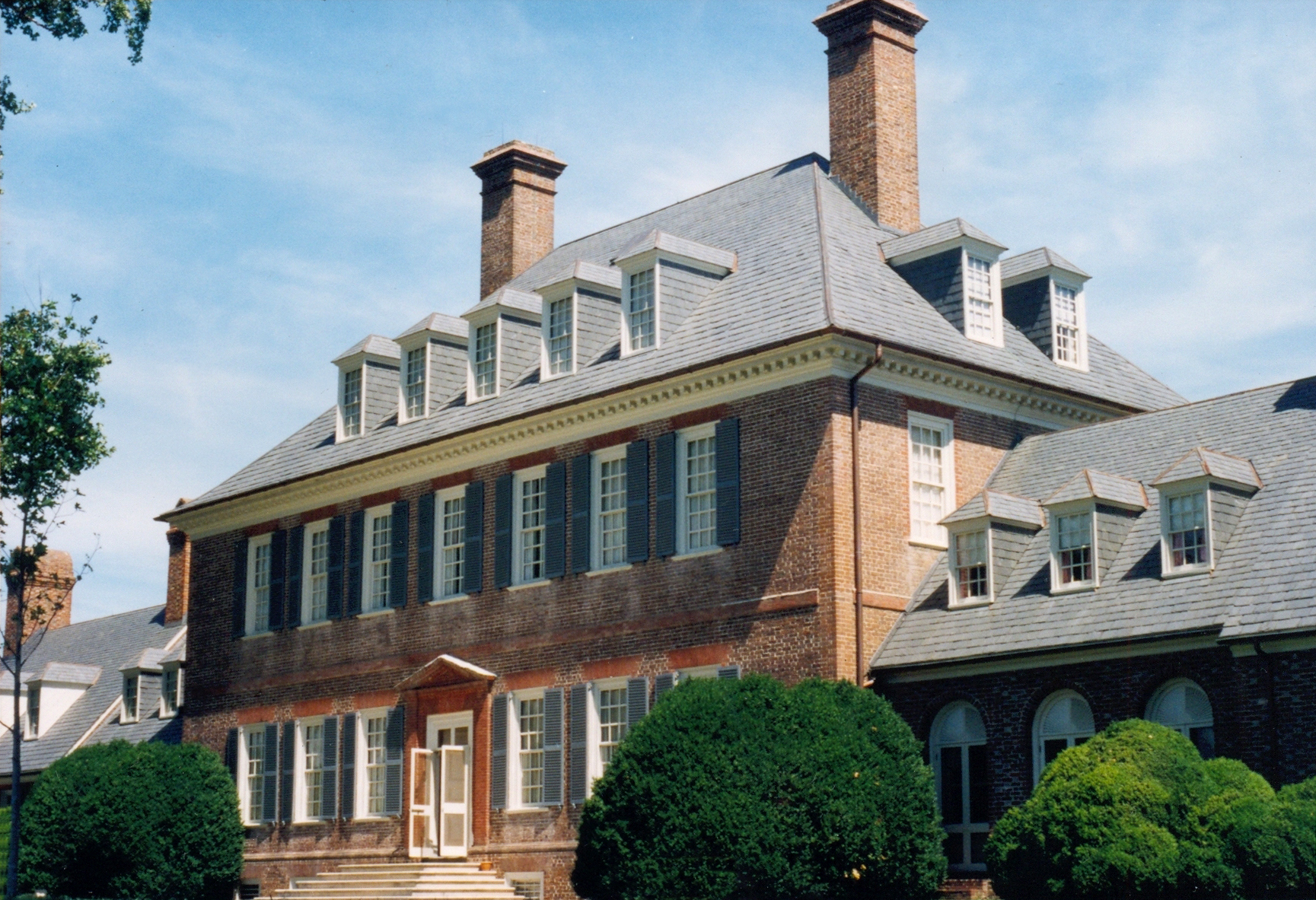
Carter's Grove Mansion

More than 100 years after Wolstenholme Towne was abandoned, Carter's Grove Plantation was built on part of the Martin's Hundred land for Carter Burwell. He was the son of Elizabeth Carter Burwell and her husband Nathaniel Burwell. Carter Burwell was the grandson of the wealthy planter Robert "King" Carter (of Lancaster County). He bequeathed the land before his death, requiring that it be called Carter's Grove.

The new plantation house was completed in 1755. In its long occupancy since then, the Carter's Grove mansion was renovated by a series of owners, the last major changes being of the late 1920s era. The last private owner died around 1964. The plantation moved into philanthropic ownership.

The Colonial Williamsburg Foundation (CW) owned the plantation from 1969 until 2007. It furnished the mansion in many period pieces, primarily of the 19th and early 20th centuries. Some of these were antiques acquired in the 1920s from an auction at Westover Plantation, long the home of descendants of William Byrd III. A landmark in the Grove Community, Carter's Grove Plantation was opened to the public by the CW Foundation for tours and interpretation of the mansion and reconstructed slave quarters. Public access was ended in 2003.

In 1976 the Foundation conducted an archeological survey of the grounds. Near the river, the survey team rediscovered the long-lost site of Wolstenholme Towne. Noted archaeologist Ivor Noel Hume documented the archaeological dig that explored the site. The Foundation reconstructed part of Wolstenholme Towne and added it to the public tours and interpretation of the large plantation.

In 2003, CW Foundation decided to concentrate on attractions closer to its Historic Area near downtown Williamsburg. It closed public access to Carter's Grove Plantation, which reduced tourist interest and revenue for the Grove community. Closer to the Historic Area, the CW Foundation developed another interpretive site for the African-American colonial experience in Virginia.

CW sold Carter's Grove to private owners in 2007, with certain protective covenants to help preserve the nature of the site. Carter's Grove Country Road formerly offered a one-way, narrow, paved link to the Historic Area of Colonial Williamsburg. After it was damaged during Hurricane Isabel in late 2003, it was closed permanently to traffic. The primary access to the plantation on U.S. Route 60 was reopened shortly after the storm. The property has been closed to the public since 2003.

=== Location, early nature of Grove community ===
The Grove Community is located about a mile inland and parallel to the riverfront adjacent to the large Carter's Grove plantation. It was formed by freedmen after the Civil War and named after nearby Grove Creek, which drains into the James River about 6 miles (9.7 km) east (downstream) of Jamestown. Grove Wharf at the confluence of Grove Creek and the river is shown on some early maps of Virginia. Many freedman likely continued at the plantation as tenant farmers and workers after the war. Until 1918, the Grove Community was lightly populated. Its residents worked mostly as farmers and fishermen. According to a state atlas in 1895, Grove had a population of 37 persons and its own post office. Today it reaches approximately 4 miles (6.4 km) along U.S. Route 60, known locally as the Pocahontas Trail.

=== Grove Station on the new C&O Railroad ===
Nearby Grove Station was established by the Chesapeake and Ohio Railway (C&O) under the leadership of Collis P. Huntington. In 1881 the C&O's Peninsula Extension was built through the area from its previous eastern terminus in Richmond to reach the coal piers and the new city of Newport News at the southeastern tip of Warwick County. Although a number of local railroad stations were established along the route, the primary purpose of the railroad was to transport through-coal traffic. This traffic pattern has continued into the 21st century under C&O successor CSX Transportation.

Local stations were established in James City County along the new railroad at Diascund, Toano, Vaiden's Siding (Norge), Kelton (Lightfoot) Ewell, Williamsburg, and Grove. While by 2009, Grove Station was long gone, other former C&O railroad stations to the east at Lee Hall and to the west at Williamsburg were extant. The latter serves intercity passenger rail service of Amtrak. The former C&O station from Ewell also survives in an adaptive reuse. Further west, a historic C&O station built in 1908 for Norge has been preserved. It was relocated in 2006 to the site of the Croaker Branch of the Williamsburg Regional Library. Following historical research, the Norge Station was repainted in its original livery, featuring a bright orange as the primary color.

== 20th century to present ==
In the first half of the 20th century, Grove had two rapid periods of growth associated with military expansion during the World Wars. It received African-American residents displaced by government land acquisition for two large military reservations established by the U.S. Navy in adjacent York County. With their compensation, the new residents built new homes in the community, with contemporary amenities including electricity, running water and sidewalks.

Grove includes residential areas, churches, neighborhood retail businesses, a nursing home, day care facilities, a modern community center and a magnet school of the Williamsburg-James City County Public Schools (WJC).

=== Relocations from "the Reservation"/Lackey ===
Prior to World War I, many African Americans lived just west of the current unincorporated town of Lackey in York County, where they (and their ancestors) had purchased land as freedmen or rented under sharecropping arrangements and established homesteads, particularly after the American Civil War. This close-knit community, along the old Yorktown-Williamsburg Road, was sometimes informally called "the Reservation," was called Lackey. It had been rapidly settled by freedmen after the Civil War, as they wanted to establish homes and institutions free of white supervision.

As the United States became involved in World War I in 1917, the U.S. Navy determined to establish a supply and munitions base near Yorktown adjacent to the York River. Under Executive Order of President Woodrow Wilson, the US Navy took a sizable piece of land to create the needed military base, initially known as a mine depot. Many homes were taken, and three churches were displaced. Some 600 residents, mostly African Americans who worked as farmers and fishermen, were displace and moved to other portions of York County and nearby Williamsburg. A few crossed the York River and settled in Gloucester County. The largest portion chose nearby James City County, where a substantial number relocated to Grove, which was south of the Navy land.

Notable among the area's black population was John Tack Roberts. Born into slavery in approximately 1860, he was a farmer and self-taught man. He "read the law" with an established firm (a common practice for whites as well in that era) and became a magistrate. He was often called "Judge Roberts". Historians credit him with being instrumental in the growth of the Grove Community. He helped some of the families displaced from "the Reservation" to obtain financial compensation from the federal government. The Grove area is now part of what is called the Roberts Magisterial District of James City County, perhaps in honor of Judge Roberts or other members of his family.

=== Camp Wallace ===
As the United States became a participant in World War I, Camp Abraham Eustis was established in 1918 in neighboring Warwick County. It encompassed Mulberry Island and some adjacent mainland. A few miles upstream, also along the James River, a satellite facility, Camp Wallace, was established in 1918 as the Upper Firing Range for artillery training. Camp Wallace was the first site of the Army's aerial tramway. In 1923 the Camp became Fort Eustis. During World War II, when Virginia still had racial segregation laws, many black and other minority U.S. Army personnel stationed at Fort Eustis were restricted to living in separate housing in the Grove Community.

In 1971, the U.S. Army agreed to a land swap with Anheuser-Busch in return for a larger parcel located directly across Skiffe's Creek from Fort Eustis (adjacent to the southeastern edge of the Greenmount Industrial Park). Along with land sold by Colonial Williamsburg, the former Camp Wallace land became part of a massive private development. Nearby, the Busch Gardens Williamsburg theme park opened in 1975, as well as a large brewery, and the Kingsmill Resort.

=== Highways ===
With the coming of the automobile as a common form of travel in the early 20th century, state and national attention was directed to improving roads. Because Grove was unincorporated and had a relatively small minority population at a time when blacks had been disenfranchised by the turn of the century Virginia constitution and discriminatory practices in voter registration, they had no say over routing of new highways. In the 1920s the new U.S. Route 60 was routed through the community from Williamsburg, displacing some homeowners and businesses. The construction was part of the Good Roads Movement. It bridged Skiffe's Creek into Warwick County to Lee Hall. The state chose this routing rather than a competing route via Halstead's Point in York County (now within the US Naval Weapons Station Yorktown).

Earlier, the east-west road which became U.S. 60 was State Route 9. SR 9 was renumbered as State Route 39 in 1923. It became U.S. 60 in the mid-1920s when the highway was routed through Grove. Warwick County treasurer and civic leader Simon Curtis held a ceremony at the Lee Hall Depot in 1924 to celebrate the completion of first hard-surfaced roadway (concrete) between Newport News and Williamsburg.

Two-lane U.S. 60 continues to form the main thoroughfare through the largely residential and neighborhood business section of Grove. It parallels the four-lane State Route 143 and Interstate 64.

=== Relocations from Magruder ===
During World War II, the US Navy acquired the property of another small town Magruder, located about 3 miles (4.8 km) north of Williamsburg in York County, and hundreds of acres of surrounding land to establish a U.S. Navy base for Seabee training. The base was initially called Camp Allen, and was later named Camp Peary. Like Grove, Lackey, and other small post-Civil War communities in northern York County, Magruder's residents were mostly African American. There were a mix of landowners and tenants. The property acquisition meant that the government also purchased land from businesses and a church.

Residents migrated from Magruder mostly to Grove. One congregation relocated Mt. Gilead Baptist Church from Magruder to Grove, where they built a new structure along U.S. 60 in 1943. The church maintains cemeteries at its new and former locations. Although access to the base at Camp Peary is highly restricted, families and others from the church may gain permission to enter to visit and tend to the old cemetery.

Magruder Avenue in Grove was likely named after the many new residents from the former town of Magruder during World War II.

A small but historic section of the northwestern edge of Grove is physically located in York County. It is listed on that county's Historical Resources Survey (as are the former sites of the "lost towns" of Lackey and Magruder).

== Modern times ==
The Grove community consists of about 1,100 families, who support a scattering of schools, churches, and retail businesses. It is located on a rural postal delivery route and carries the mailing address of Williamsburg, Virginia 23185. That historic city is located about 5 miles (8 km) to the west.

Between Williamsburg and Grove are Anheuser-Busch industries and developments, including the company's Williamsburg brewery, Busch Gardens Williamsburg theme park, an office park, and the Kingsmill resort and planned community. Grove has attracted industrial development related to regional businesses.

=== Residential ===
Grove is largely a bedroom community. Housing in Grove is generally considered more affordable than in many other areas of the fast-growing James City County. Many families have lived there for generations. Housing consists of older detached single-family homes situated on lots, with many dating to the two world war periods of rapid growth, and a number of newer houses. The latter are both interspersed in older neighborhoods and concentrated in newer subdivisions. Several large condominium projects and mobile home parks provide other choices. Two larger mobile home developments feature modern amenities, such as underground wiring, curbs and gutters, paved driveways, street lighting, and community playgrounds.

As of 2007, residential development continued with a new townhouse project, and many new detached single family homes. While the mobile home parks are not expanding, in some instances owners are replacing units with new or much newer mobile homes on the existing lots. Throughout Grove, there are few vacant lots for additional mobile homes.

=== Community facilities ===
James River Elementary School and Abram Frink Community Center are co-located in a modern complex.

There are five churches, two nursing homes, two day-care centers, and a fire station. The Grove Christian Outreach Center (GCOC) was founded by Grove Community Church in 2004, and is now an independent 501c3 organization. Staffed by volunteers, GCOC assists with family needs and coordination of community resources, such as the local food bank.

=== Industrial ===
Near Grove's eastern edge, on the south side of U.S. Route 60, the county's James River Enterprise Zone, an Urban Enterprise Zone is located. The 5.6 square mile (15 km^{2}) area contains 2,400 acres (9.7 km^{2}) planned and zoned for industrial uses. James City County is seeking additional industrial business in this prime area of the county. The sites within a designated "enterprise zone" offer state and local incentives to businesses that locate in those zones, invest and create jobs.

Since the James River Enterprise Zone's inception in 1996, James River Commerce Center and Greenmount industrial parks have added tenants such as a Ball Manufacturing plant, an aluminum can plant which supplies Anheuser-Busch's Williamsburg brewery. A distribution center for Wal-Mart and a Haynes furniture warehouse are also located there.

=== U.S. Route 60 relocation project ===
For several years in the early 21st century, James City County has worked to improve US Route 60 between Grove and Newport News. Officials wanted to provide better access to Interstate 64 from the industrial sites in Grove, which generate a considerable volume of truck traffic, and reduce the same on the existing roadway.

Access for the industrial traffic to I-64 requires a drive of about 4 miles (6.4 km) in either direction on two-lane sections of U.S. 60 at non-highway speeds through residential areas. They must share the road with local traffic and school buses serving either the James River Elementary School's county-wide magnet program or alternatively, the large elementary school in the Lee Hall community in neighboring Newport News.

In June 2007, Virginia's Commonwealth Transportation Board approved a major portion of the funding needed for the U.S. Route 60 relocation project. The relocated divided highway will begin on its western end near the current intersection of Blow Flats Road. The new alignment will take it through the Greenmount Industrial Park to reach the Newport News city limits. There, a new crossing of Skiffe's Creek will be built. The remainder of the roadway will continue on a new alignment and effectively bypass the two-lane portion of U.S. Route 60 through the historic Lee Hall community. It will rejoin the current highway near the cloverleaf intersection of Fort Eustis Boulevard, where there is four-lane access close by to exit 250 of Interstate 64, as well as an extant four-lane section of U.S. Route 60. In separate projects, portions of Warwick Boulevard east of Fort Eustis in Newport News are being widened to six lanes. Fort Eustis Boulevard has also been widened to four lanes between Jefferson Avenue and U.S. Route 17 in Newport News and York County.

A similar roads issue was earlier visited in the 1930s, when the current parallel State Route 143 (Merrimack Trail) was built as part of a four-laned through-route alternative to U.S. 60 for increasing volumes of east-west through traffic in the area. Once again, plans have been made to preserve the two-lane, bucolic nature of Route 60 through the Grove and Lee Hall communities, and to avoid the major impact which would have resulted by widening the road through these historic communities.

=== Public transportation ===
There is little retail or tourist employment in Grove, especially since Carter's Grove Plantation closed in 2003. Many residents use the Williamsburg Area Transit Authority (WATA) public bus system or its complementary paratransit service to reach employment, shopping, and other business at adjacent Busch Gardens Williamsburg, in downtown Williamsburg, and at businesses along the way, or to transfer to other routes in the WATA network through the system's hub at the Williamsburg Transportation Center. Amtrak, Greyhound Lines, and Trailways services, as well as taxicabs and rental cars, are also located in Williamsburg.

The WATA bus route serving Grove leaves the Williamsburg Transportation Center on the hour (and half hour during peak weekday hours) and runs along U.S. Route 60 through the entire length of Grove. It continues east to serve the Wal-Mart distribution center, a Haynes furniture warehouse in the growing Green Mount industrial park, and provides an hourly connection seven days a week to the massive Hampton Roads Transit (HRT) system at the western edge of Newport News at Lee Hall. The WATA bus stops on a side street adjacent to an industrial park, returning to Williamsburg via Grove with departures on the half-hour (and hour during peak weekday hours).

The HRT system covers most of the other cities of Hampton Roads, with extensive networks in highly urbanized areas of Newport News, Hampton, and Norfolk. Some heavily patronized HRT routes trace their heritage to street railway lines started in the late 19th and early 20th centuries.

== Notable residents and sites ==
- Dr. J. Blaine "Jim" Blayton (1905–2002) was a prominent African American physician who practiced in the Williamsburg area.
- Ron Springs, ex-Dallas Cowboys player.
- In the mid-1970s, the Busch Gardens Williamsburg theme park, a large brewery, and the Kingsmill planned community and resort were developed by Anheuser-Busch Corporation.

== See also ==
- Former counties, cities, and towns of Virginia
- Locust Grove, Virginia
- Sugar Grove, Virginia
