= Wolstenholme Towne =

- Townsite
- Location within Virginia Location within the United States
- Present Country: United States of America
- State: Virginia
- County: James City County
- Community: Grove
- Established: 1618
- Abandoned: 1622
- Founder: Virginia Company of London
- Named for: Sir John Wolstenholme

Wolstenholme Towne was an English settlement in the Colony of Virginia, 7 miles (11 km) east of the colonial capital, Jamestown. One of the earliest English settlements in the New World, the town existed for roughly four years until its destruction in the Indian massacre of 1622. The Wolstenholme Towne site was later built upon by the Carter's Grove plantation in 1750 and is located within the present-day community of Grove, Virginia, United States.

== Establishment ==
Wolstenholme Towne was established around 1618 in Martin's Hundred, a plantation organized into a hundred, beginning with a population of about 40 settlers of the Virginia Company of London. The settlement was named for Sir John Wolstenholme (1562-1639), one of its investors, and housing consisted of rough cabins of wattle and daub woven on wooden posts thrust into the clay subsoil. William Harwood was governor of Wolstenholme Towne.

== Destruction ==
On March 22 1622 [O.S. 01 April 1622], the Native American Powhatans launched what became known as the Indian massacre of 1622. Modern scholarship has questioned this framing and suggested that the campaign was in retaliation for previous violent acts committed by the English. The Powhatan attacked settlements from the fall line of the James River to Hampton Roads, surprising the colonists in their homes and fields, burning and looting the settlements. This resulted in the killing of 347 of an estimated total of 1,200 colonists, a quarter of the population of Virginia. Martin's Hundred was the plantation hardest hit with more than 50 residents recorded as dead, with perhaps as many as 70 dying within the hundred. Wolstenholme Towne's death toll was not separated in the death rolls. Surviving settlers in Virginia were largely evacuated by governor's order to Jamestown, which had been spared due to a last-minute warning. Wolstenholme Towne, like almost all English settlements in the region, was permanently abandoned.

== Modern status ==
In the 20th century, separate groups of archaeologists uncovered the sites of both Wolstenholme Towne and Henricus, another settlement founded by Sir Thomas Dale in 1611 also destroyed in the Indian massacre. Wolstenholme Towne is located on the grounds of the Carter's Grove plantation in the Grove community of southeastern James City County, and the findings were chronicled by author and historian Ivor Noel Hume.

In December 2007, Carter's Grove was acquired from the Colonial Williamsburg Foundation by CNET founder Halsey Minor for $15.3 million. Minor planned to use the mansion as a private residence and use the site as a center for a thoroughbred horse breeding program. However, Minor who never lived in the mansion and made no changes or repairs to Carter's Grove, stopped making payments in 2010 announcing that he owed $12 million in debts. His Carter's Grove LLC went into bankruptcy resulting in a federal judge turning the property over to a trustee to run. The property was assessed by trustees in October 2011 to determine the actual extent of damage present. Repairs have been made to the HVAC system, which has stabilized the temperature within the building and eliminated the damaging mold previously noted. Repairs to the structure are ongoing with the goal of returning Carter's Grove to the condition when it had been sold to Minor.

== See also ==
- List of former counties, cities, and towns of Virginia
