= Blayton =

Blayton is a surname. Notable people with the surname include:

- Betty Blayton (1937–2016), American activist, advocate, artist, arts administrator, educator, lecturer
- J. Blaine Blayton (1905–2002), African-American physician in the Williamsburg, Virginia, area
- Jesse B. Blayton (1897–1977), radio entrepreneur, civil rights activist, professor, accountant, businessman

== See also ==
- J. Blaine Blayton Elementary School, southeastern Virginia
- Blaton
- Blaydon
- Blyton
