= James City County, Virginia =

County in Virginia, United States

- County
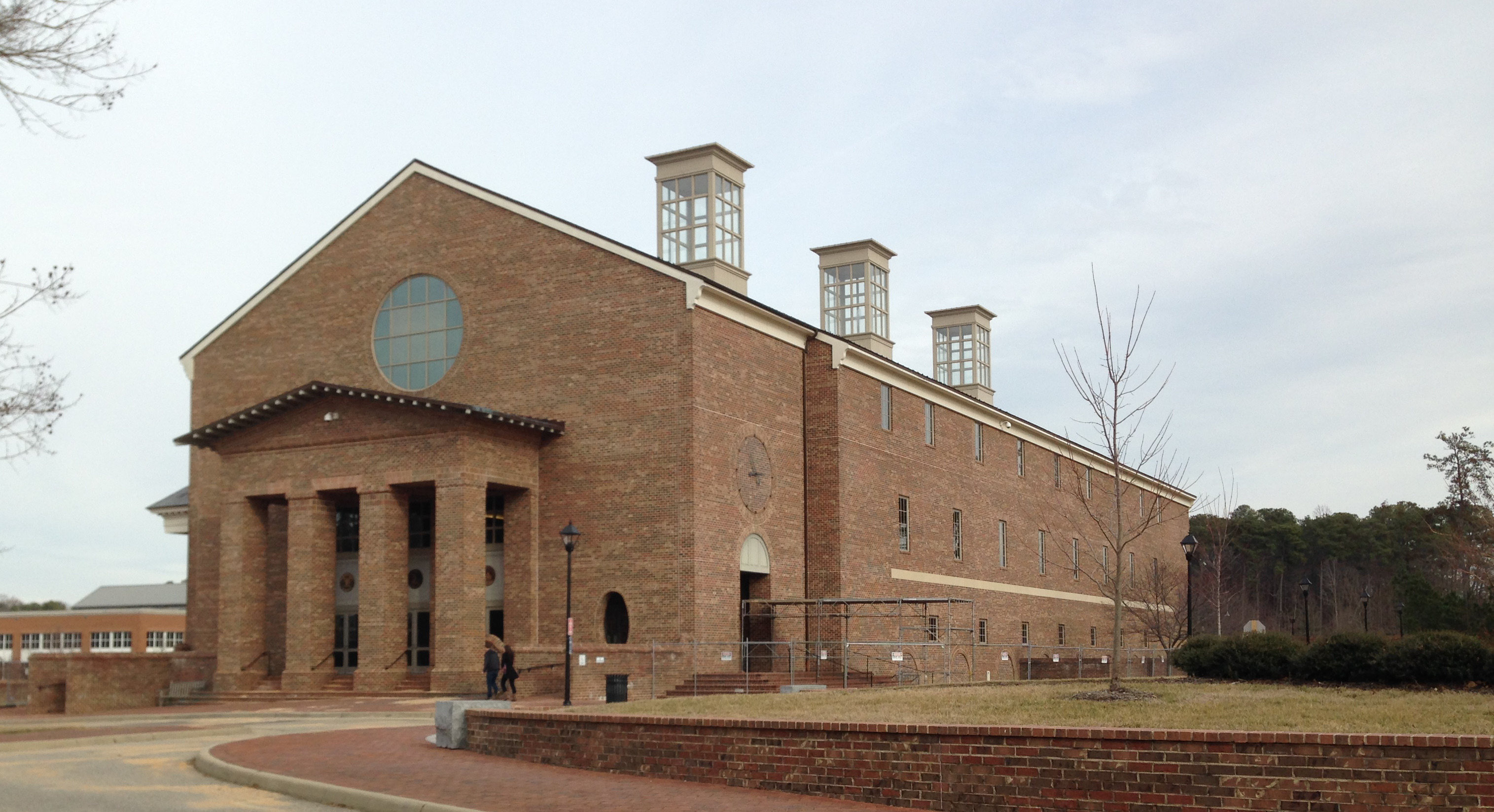
- James City County-Williamsburg Combined Courthouse

- Flag Seal Logo

- Location within the U.S. state of Virginia
- Coordinates: 37°19′N 76°46′W
- Country: United States
- State: Virginia
- Founded: 1619 (as James Cittie)
- Named for: James I of England
- Seat: Williamsburg

Area
  - Total: 179 sq mi (460 km^{2})
  - Land: 142 sq mi (370 km^{2})
  - Water: 37 sq mi (96 km^{2}) 20.5%

Population (2020)
  - Total: 78,254
  - Estimate (2025): 83,326 ▲
  - Density: 551/sq mi (213/km^{2})
- Time zone: UTC−5 (Eastern)
  - Summer (DST): UTC−4 (EDT)
- Congressional district: 1st
- Website: www.jamescitycountyva.gov

James City County is a county located in the Commonwealth of Virginia. As of the 2020 census, the population was 78,254. Although politically separate from the county, the county seat is the adjacent independent city of Williamsburg. Located on the Virginia Peninsula, James City County is included in the Virginia Beach-Norfolk-Newport News, VA-NC Metropolitan Statistical Area. It is often associated with Williamsburg, an independent city, and Jamestown which is within the county.

First settled by the English colonists in 1607 at Jamestown in the Virginia Colony, the county was formally created in 1634 as James City Shire by order of King Charles I. James City County is considered one of only five original shires of Virginia to still be extant today in essentially the same political form. The Jamestown 2007 celebration marked the 400th anniversary of the founding of Jamestown.

Tourism is a major part of the region's economy, as is high technology. The College of William and Mary is nearby, as well as NASA, Jefferson Laboratory, and numerous defense contractors, giving the region the highest concentration of scientists and engineers per capita in the nation. James City County is home to the Busch Gardens Williamsburg theme park, the Kingsmill Resort, and the Williamsburg Pottery Factory. The Historic Jamestowne and Jamestown Settlement attractions combine with Colonial Williamsburg, and are linked to Yorktown by the National Park Service's Colonial Parkway.

== History ==
James City County on an 1895 map

This section incorporates text from the 1911 edition of the Encyclopædia Britannica, which is in the public domain.

=== 17th and 18th centuries ===
==== Proprietary colony ====
The Virginia Company of London was granted a proprietorship (charter) by King James I of England to attempt to establish a colony in the area we now know as Virginia. England had been at war with Spain and was seeking both capital funds and income in the form of royalties. In December 1606, three ships set sail from England, led by Captain Christopher Newport. Upon reaching the New World at Cape Henry, they selected a site to settle about 40 miles (64 km) inland from the coast along a river to be better protected from attacks by sea from other Europeans. Soon after the establishment of Jamestown in 1607 in the new Colony of Virginia, English settlers first explored and then began settling more of the areas adjacent to Hampton Roads and along the James River.

The first five years were very difficult, and the majority of the colonists perished. In 1612, imported strains of tobacco cultivated in Virginia by colonist John Rolfe were successfully exported and a cash crop had been identified.

In 1619, the Virginia Company of London under a new leader, Sir Edwin Sandys, instituted a number of changes, to help stimulate more investment and attract settlers from England. In the long view, foremost among these was the establishment of what became the House of Burgesses, the first representative legislative body in the European settlement of North America, predecessor of today's Virginia General Assembly, first convened by a Royal Governor, Sir George Yeardley, of Flowerdew Hundred Plantation. Also in 1619, the plantations and developed portions of the Colony were divided into four "incorporations" or "citties," as they were then called. These were (east to west) Elizabeth Cittie (initially known as Kecoughtan), James Cittie, Charles Cittie, and Henrico Cittie. Each cittie covered a very large area. Elizabeth Cittie not only included land on both side of the James River, but most of what we now know as South Hampton Roads and also included Virginia's Eastern Shore.

The Virginia Company's "James Cittie" stretched across the Peninsula to the York River, and included the seat of government for the entire colony at Jamestown Island. Each of the four citties extended across the James River, the major thoroughfare of commerce for the settlers, and included land on both the north and south shores. With the incentives of 1619, many new developments, known as "hundreds" were established.

==== Wolstenholme Towne, Carter's Grove Plantation ====
About this same time, downriver from Jamestown, in the southeastern end of what is now James City County near present-day Grove, a fortified settlement known as Wolstenholme Towne was established near the river and just east of the confluence of Grove Creek on a land grant known as Martin's Hundred. However, the population of the town, named for Sir John Wolstenholme, a principal of the Martin's Hundred Society investors back in England, was severely decimated during the Indian massacre of 1622, and many men, women and children were killed or abducted. While it was rebuilt, Wolstenholme Towne was eventually abandoned about 1643, and soon even the location was forgotten as it became one of the lost towns of Virginia.

Over 100 years later, the property had become part of Carter's Grove Plantation, itself built around 1753 by the grandson of Robert "King" Carter of Corotoman, who had become one of the wealthiest planters and served for a period as Virginia's acting governor. Another 200 years later, the long-lost site of Wolstenholme Towne was rediscovered in 1976 during an archaeological dig overseen by Ivor Noel Hume after the Carter's Grove Plantation property came under the ownership of Colonial Williamsburg Foundation.

==== Royal colony, creation of shires (counties) ====
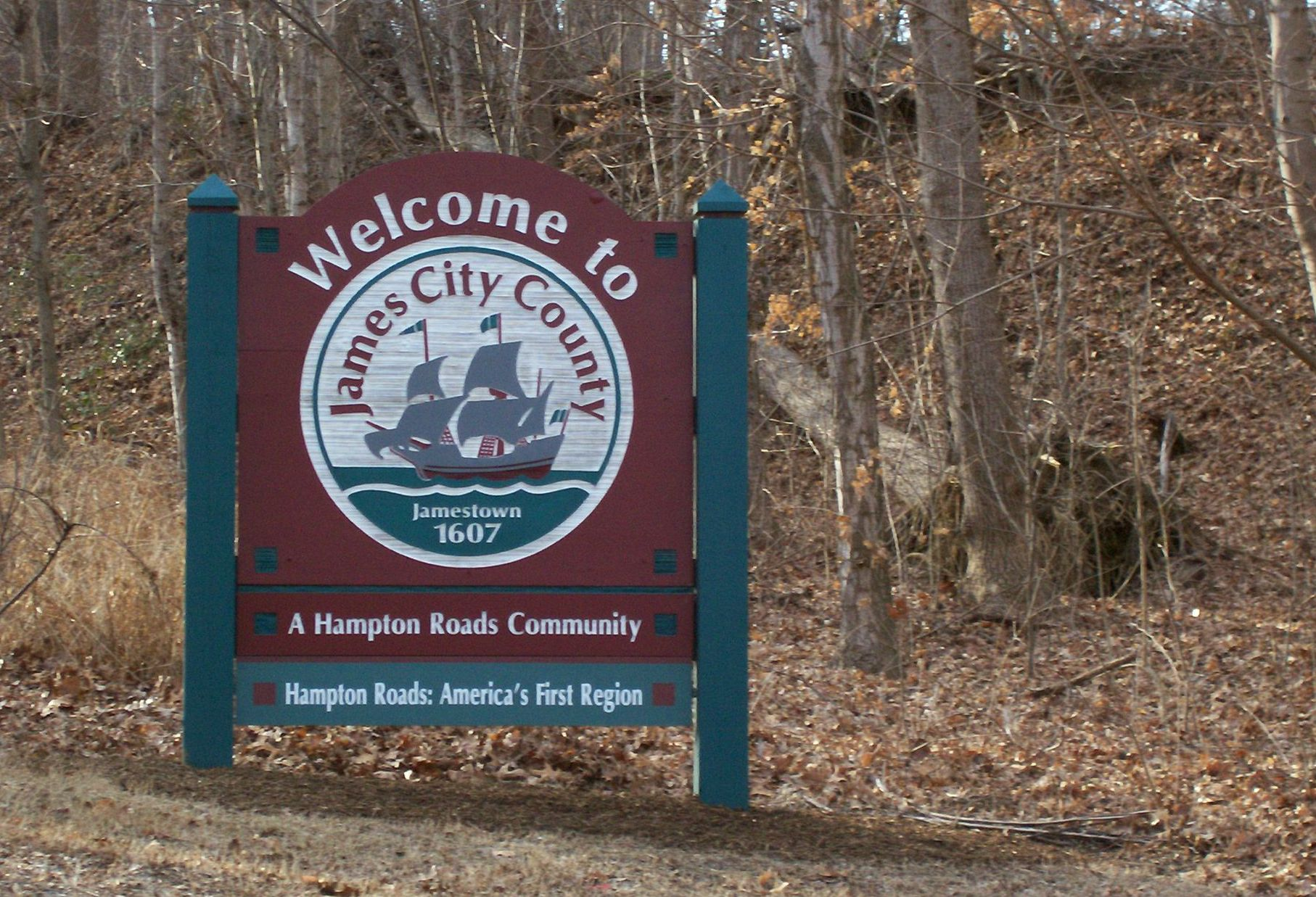
James City County sign on U.S. Route 60 entering Grove from east at Skiffe's Creek. This border with the former Warwick County was established in 1634 by order of King Charles I of England (Warwick County became part of the City of Newport News in 1958).

The privately owned Virginia Company lost its charter in 1624, and Virginia became a royal colony. In 1634, the English Crown created eight shires (i.e., counties) in the colony of Virginia, with a total population of approximately 5,000 inhabitants. James City Shire, as well as the James River and Jamestown which had been named earlier, took its name from King James I, the father of the then-king, Charles I. About 1642–43, the name of the James City Shire was changed to James City County.

==== Middle Plantation, Williamsburg, Green Spring ====
On high ground midway across the Virginia Peninsula, Middle Plantation was established in 1632 as a fortress in the ongoing conflicts with Native Americans. By 1634, a palisade or fortification had been completed across the peninsula with Middle Plantation at the center. This protected the lower peninsula to the east.

Middle Plantation and James City County were selected for the site of the College of William and Mary in 1693 and became the location of the capital in 1699 after Jamestown was burned (again) in 1698. Shortly thereafter, Middle Plantation was renamed Williamsburg in honor of King William III of England. The capital was moved to Richmond in 1780 at the outset of the American Revolution. The Battle of Green Spring was fought in the county just a short time before the British surrender at Yorktown. (Green Spring Plantation was the former home of Royal Governor William Berkeley.)

=== 19th and 20th centuries ===
During the American Civil War, the Battle of Williamsburg was waged in York and James City County during the Peninsula Campaign in 1862. Some earthworks remain at the site of the Confederate Fort Magruder. After the War, Collis P. Huntington extended the new Chesapeake and Ohio Railway through the county to reach new coal piers he had built at Newport News on Hampton Roads. Railroad stations were established (listed west to east) at Diascund, Toano, Vaiden's Crossing, Kelton, Ewell, Williamsburg, and Grove. In Williamsburg, the temporary tracks initially laid ran down the middle of Duke of Gloucester Street.

After a change in the Virginia constitution in 1871, Williamsburg became an independent city from James City County in 1884. Williamsburg and James City County share a combined school system, courts, and some constitutional officers.

Beginning in the early 20th century, preservation and restoration efforts resulted in a major increase in tourism to the county and surrounding area. Attractions developed included Colonial Williamsburg, Jamestown Settlement, the Colonial Parkway, Carter's Grove Plantation, and Busch Gardens Williamsburg.

==== Colonial Williamsburg ====
Perhaps the best-known of the 20th century changes of a local nature which affected James City County was the Restoration and development of Colonial Williamsburg. Driven by the vision of an Episcopal priest and initially funded by the heir to the Standard Oil fortune, John D. Rockefeller Jr. and his wife Abby Aldrich Rockefeller, Colonial Williamsburg (or "CW" as it is informally known locally) became a world-class attraction like no other.

While the Historic Area of Colonial Williamsburg is within the city limits of Williamsburg and not located within James City County, in the earliest periods, CW acquired vast acreage in the entire area, notably to the north and east of the Historic District. Foremost was a desire to preserve views and facilitate the effort to allow a visitor to experience as much of the late 18th century experience as possibly with regard to the surrounding environment.

The entrance roadways to the Historic Area were planned with great care. Even in modern times, pathways from the Colonial Parkway and from the relocated U.S. Route 60 at Bypass Road and North Henry Street are without commercial development. The protected vista was extended along U.S. Route 132 in York County to the new road when Route 143 was built as the Merrimack Trail (originally State Route 168) in the 1930s. When Interstate 64 was planned and built in the 1960s and early 1970s, the additional land along Route 143 from the designated "Colonial Williamsburg" exit was similarly protected from development. Even in modern times, no commercial properties are encountered to reach the Visitor Center, although the land is very valuable and the distance is several miles.

The area to the immediate east of the Historic Area in James City County included a vast tract known as the Kingsmill Plantation property. It was bisected by the historic Quarterpath Road, dating to the 17th century, which led from Williamsburg to the James River at Burwell's Landing. The manor house, built in the 1730s, had burned in 1843, but several brick dependencies survived (and still do into the 21st century). Immediately to the east of the Kingsmill tract was Carter's Grove Plantation. It was begun by a grandson of Royal Governor Robert "King" Carter. For over 200 years, it had gone through a succession of owners and modifications. Then, in the 1960s, after the death of its last resident, Ms. Molly McRae, Carter's Grove Plantation came the control of the Rockefeller Foundation, and was given to Colonial Williamsburg as a gift. At that point in time, the mid-1960s, CW owned land extended all the way from the Historic District to Skiffe's Creek, at the edge of Newport News near Lee Hall.

(Carter's Grove, at a distance of 8 miles (13 km), was operated as a satellite facility of Colonial Williamsburg, with several important programs there, until 2003. Eventually, most of the programs were relocated to be closer to the Historic Area, and the property was sold in 2007, with restrictive and conservation covenants to protect it. See separate article Carter's Grove for more details).

==== Anheuser-Busch ====
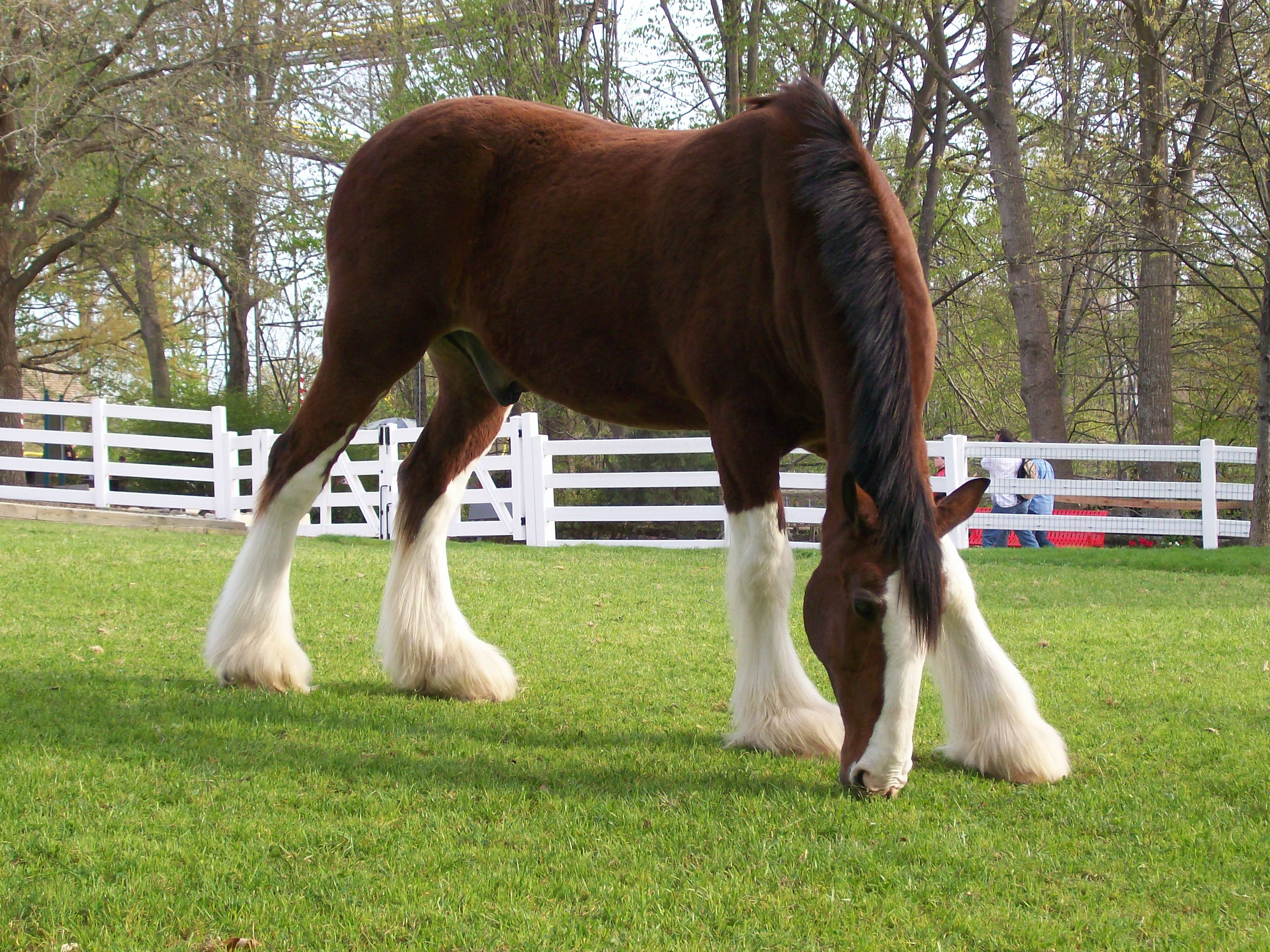
One of the famous Clydesdale horses is seen at the Busch Gardens Williamsburg theme park, part of a massive Anheuser-Busch development in James City County which also includes a brewery, office park, and the Kingsmill Resort located east of Williamsburg just west of Grove.

In the second half of the 20th century, distant from the Historic Area and not along the carefully protected sight paths, the vacant land east of town which was owned by Colonial Williamsburg and locally known as the Kingsmill tract had been long unproductive for either CW or the community. That changed in the early 1970s, under the leadership of CW Chairman Winthrop Rockefeller.

Rockefeller, a son of Abby and John D. Rockefeller Jr., was a frequent visitor and particularly fond of Carter's Grove in the late 1960s. He also served as Governor of the State of Arkansas. He became aware of some expansion plans elsewhere on the Peninsula of his St. Louis-based neighbor, August Anheuser Busch Jr., head of Anheuser-Busch (AB). A businessman and promoter, he had originated the use of the now famous Clydesdale team as a company logo in the 1930s. In 1959, the company had opened what today is known as a theme park in Tampa, Florida which was known as simply "Busch Gardens". It was visionary, and predated the massive Walt Disney World development nearby by several years; today it is known as Busch Gardens Tampa Bay.

While details have never been widely publicized, by the time "Win" Rockefeller and "Gussie" Busch completed their discussions and negotiations, the biggest changes in the Williamsburg area since the Restoration began 40 years earlier were underway. Among the goals were to complement Colonial Williamsburg attractions and enhance the local economy.

The large tract consisting primarily of the Kingsmill land was sold by the Colonial Williamsburg Foundation to Anheuser-Busch (AB) for planned development. The AB investment included building a large brewery, the Busch Gardens Williamsburg theme park, the Kingsmill planned resort community, and McLaws Circle, an office park. A 60-acre (240,000 m^{2}) portion was donated by Anheuser-Busch in the late 1960s to develop the James City County office complex.

AB and related entities from that development plan now are the source of the area's largest employment base, surpassing both Colonial Williamsburg and the local military bases. In 2008, Anheuser-Busch ranked as the world's second largest brewer.

=== 21st century ===
At the turn of the 21st century, new archaeological work was underway at Jamestown and nearby Green Spring Plantation, with the premise of new historical discoveries. Each is especially attractive to archaeologists because of the lack of development after the mid 19th century.

Another archeological site, Wolstenholme Towne at Carter's Grove, was protected by covenants when it was sold in 2007, and may see future activity.

== Geography ==
Jamestown, VA

Climate chart (precipitation, max. and min. temperature)
J	F	M	A	M	J	J	A	S	O	N	D
3.3 48 28	2.9 52 30	4 61 37	3.4 71 45	3.9 78 55	3.5 86 64	4.6 89 68	4.5 88 66	4.3 81 59	3.3 72 48	3.3 62 39	3.4 51 31
- █ Average max. and min. temperatures in °F
- █ Precipitation totals in inches
Metric conversion
J	F	M	A	M	J	J	A	S	O	N	D
84 9 −2	74 11 −1	102 16 3	86 22 7	99 26 13	89 30 18	117 32 20	114 31 19	109 27 15	84 22 9	84 17 4	86 11 0
- █ Average max. and min. temperatures in °C
- █ Precipitation totals in mm

According to the U.S. Census Bureau, the county has a total area of 179 square miles (460 km^{2}), of which 142 square miles (370 km^{2}) is land, and 37 square miles (96 km^{2}) (20.5%) is water. The James City County GIS office specifies the county as being 115,011.9 acres (46,543.7 ha)

James City County straddles two major watersheds, the James River Watershed and the York River Watershed. (Both are sub watersheds of the Chesapeake Bay watershed, which stretches from Pennsylvania to Virginia). Within the James River and York watersheds are eleven sub watersheds: Diascund Creek, Ware Creek, Yarmouth Creek, Gordon Creek, Powhatan Creek, Mill Creek, College Creek, James River, York River, Skiffe's Creek and Chickahominy River.

=== Adjacent counties and independent cities ===
- New Kent County - northwest
- King and Queen County - northeast
- Gloucester County - northeast
- York County - east
- Williamsburg - east
- Newport News - southeast
- Surry County - south
- Charles City County - west

=== National protected areas ===
- Colonial National Historical Park (part)
- Jamestown National Historic Site

== Demographics ==
Historical population
Census	Pop.	Note	%±
1790	4,070		—
1800	3,931		−3.4%
1810	4,094		4.1%
1820	4,563		11.5%
1830	3,838		−15.9%
1840	3,779		−1.5%
1850	4,020		6.4%
1860	5,798		44.2%
1870	4,425		−23.7%
1880	5,422		22.5%
1890	5,643		4.1%
1900	3,688		−34.6%
1910	3,624		−1.7%
1920	3,676		1.4%
1930	3,879		5.5%
1940	4,907		26.5%
1950	6,317		28.7%
1960	11,539		82.7%
1970	17,853		54.7%
1980	22,763		27.5%
1990	34,859		53.1%
2000	48,102		38.0%
2010	67,009		39.3%
2020	78,254		16.8%
2025 (est.)	83,326	▲	6.5%
U.S. Decennial Census; 1790-1960 1900-1990; 1990-2000 2010-2020

=== Racial and ethnic composition ===
James City County, Virginia – Racial and ethnic composition Note: the US Census treats Hispanic/Latino as an ethnic category. This table excludes Latinos from the racial categories and assigns them to a separate category. Hispanics/Latinos may be of any race.
Race / Ethnicity (NH = Non-Hispanic)	Pop 1980	Pop 1990	Pop 2000	Pop 2010	Pop 2020	% 1980	% 1990	% 2000	% 2010	% 2020
White alone (NH)	15,910	27,526	38,954	52,049	56,647	69.89%	78.96%	80.98%	77.67%	72.39%
Black or African American alone (NH)	6,371	6,430	6,858	8,662	9,832	27.99%	18.45%	14.26%	12.93%	12.56%
Native American or Alaska Native alone (NH)	49	68	121	173	165	0.22%	0.20%	0.25%	0.26%	0.21%
Asian alone (NH)	170	440	682	1,488	2,254	0.75%	1.26%	1.42%	2.22%	2.88%
Native Hawaiian or Pacific Islander alone (NH)	x	x	19	54	48	x	x	0.04%	0.08%	0.06%
Other race alone (NH)	33	13	64	127	361	0.14%	0.04%	0.13%	0.19%	0.46%
Mixed race or Multiracial (NH)	x	x	588	1,432	3,748	x	x	1.22%	2.14%	4.79%
Hispanic or Latino (any race)	230	382	816	3,024	5,199	1.01%	1.10%	1.70%	4.51%	6.64%
Total	22,763	34,859	48,102	67,009	78,254	100.00%	100.00%	100.00%	100.00%	100.00%

=== 2020 census ===
As of the 2020 census, the county had a population of 78,254. The median age was 47.7 years. 19.7% of residents were under the age of 18 and 26.8% of residents were 65 years of age or older. For every 100 females there were 92.3 males, and for every 100 females age 18 and over there were 89.7 males age 18 and over.

The racial makeup of the county was 73.7% White, 12.8% Black or African American, 0.4% American Indian and Alaska Native, 2.9% Asian, 0.1% Native Hawaiian and Pacific Islander, 2.6% from some other race, and 7.5% from two or more races. Hispanic or Latino residents of any race comprised 6.6% of the population.

85.8% of residents lived in urban areas, while 14.2% lived in rural areas.

There were 31,627 households in the county, of which 26.9% had children under the age of 18 living with them and 24.4% had a female householder with no spouse or partner present. About 23.6% of all households were made up of individuals and 12.7% had someone living alone who was 65 years of age or older.

There were 33,993 housing units, of which 7.0% were vacant. Among occupied housing units, 75.6% were owner-occupied and 24.4% were renter-occupied. The homeowner vacancy rate was 1.6% and the rental vacancy rate was 7.9%.

=== 2010 Census ===
As of the 2010 census, there were 67,009 people, 19,003 households, and 13,986 families residing in the county. The population density was 337 people per square mile (130 people/km^{2}). There were 20,772 housing units at an average density of 145 units per square mile (56 units/km^{2}). The racial makeup of the county was 80.3% White, 13.1% Black or African American, 0.3% Native American, 2.2% Asian, 0.1% Pacific Islander, 1.4% from other races, and 2.6% from two or more races. 4.5% of the population were Hispanic or Latino of any race.

Of the total 19,003 households, 30.50% had children under the age of 18 living with them, 61.80% were married couples living together, 8.90% had a female householder with no husband present, and 26.40% were non-families. 21.40% of all households were made up of individuals, and 9.00% had someone living alone who was 65 years of age or older. The average household size was 2.47 and the average family size was 2.86.

In the county, the population was spread out, with 23.30% under the age of 18, 6.40% from 18 to 24, 27.30% from 25 to 44, 26.10% from 45 to 64, and 16.80% who were 65 years of age or older. The median age was 41 years. For every 100 females there were 93.90 males. For every 100 females aged 18 and over, there were 91.00 males age 18 and over.

== Government ==
County administrator
- Scott Stevens

Board of supervisors

- Berkeley District: Vice Chair - Ruth Larson (I)
- Jamestown District: James "Jim" Icenhour (D)
- Powhatan District: Tracy Wainwright (R)
- Roberts District: Chair - John J. McGlennon (D)
- Stonehouse District: Barbara Null (R)

Constitutional officers

- Clerk of the Circuit Court: Mona Foley (R)
- Commissioner of the Revenue: Richard W. Bradshaw (D)
- Commonwealth's Attorney: Nathan R. Green (R)
- Sheriff: Robert J. "Bob" Deeds (R)
- Treasurer: Jennifer Tomes (I)

State and federal elected representatives

- Virginia Senate
  - Danny Diggs (24th District - R)
  - Ryan McDougle (26th District - R)
- Virginia House of Delegates
  - Mark Downey (politician) (69th District - D)
  - Jessica Anderson (politician) (71st District - D)
- U.S. House of Representatives
  - Rob Wittman (R)

Presidential elections
At the national level, James City County had been a Republican-leaning county in presidential elections for decades, although as the county grew in the 2000s it began to trend Democratic and recent results suggest the county may soon become more of a purple county than a solid red one. While Republican George W. Bush scored convincing wins in the early 2000s, the margin narrowed considerably for Democrat Barack Obama's two elections, and in 2016 Republican Donald Trump won the county with only a narrow plurality of 49.4% to Democrat Hillary Clinton's 44.3%, and in 2018, Democratic US Senator Tim Kaine won the county outright in his 16-point statewide win. In 2020 Democrat Joe Biden won with 51.50% to Republican Donald Trump's 46.66%. The county had not voted Democratic at the presidential level since delivering a plurality win to Hubert Humphrey in the 1968 election. In 2024, the county swung even more Democratic in support of Kamala Harris, despite her significantly inferior nationwide performance relative to Biden's in 2020.

United States presidential election results for James City County, Virginia
Year	Republican		Democratic		Third party(ies)	
Year	No.	%	No.	%	No.	%
1880	358	59.77%	241	40.23%	0	0.00%
1884	609	71.48%	243	28.52%	0	0.00%
1888	607	73.49%	219	26.51%	0	0.00%
1892	466	66.57%	233	33.29%	1	0.14%
1896	291	52.43%	261	47.03%	3	0.54%
1900	255	46.36%	294	53.45%	1	0.18%
1904	34	24.64%	98	71.01%	6	4.35%
1908	62	31.63%	132	67.35%	2	1.02%
1912	10	6.41%	128	82.05%	18	11.54%
1916	34	20.86%	127	77.91%	2	1.23%
1920	61	22.51%	207	76.38%	3	1.11%
1924	54	22.50%	173	72.08%	13	5.42%
1928	204	50.37%	201	49.63%	0	0.00%
1932	116	27.29%	302	71.06%	7	1.65%
1936	70	18.82%	302	81.18%	0	0.00%
1940	146	32.16%	306	67.40%	2	0.44%
1944	161	33.68%	317	66.32%	0	0.00%
1948	177	39.78%	198	44.49%	70	15.73%
1952	527	60.23%	346	39.54%	2	0.23%
1956	728	62.54%	312	26.80%	124	10.65%
1960	873	50.49%	845	48.87%	11	0.64%
1964	1,092	38.46%	1,744	61.43%	3	0.11%
1968	1,443	35.50%	1,521	37.42%	1,101	27.08%
1972	3,372	61.97%	1,992	36.61%	77	1.42%
1976	3,186	49.36%	3,000	46.48%	268	4.15%
1980	4,289	53.29%	3,068	38.12%	691	8.59%
1984	7,104	66.54%	3,486	32.65%	87	0.81%
1988	8,945	64.95%	4,642	33.70%	186	1.35%
1992	8,781	48.19%	6,536	35.87%	2,904	15.94%
1996	10,120	54.45%	7,247	38.99%	1,219	6.56%
2000	14,628	59.73%	9,090	37.11%	774	3.16%
2004	18,949	60.95%	11,934	38.39%	207	0.67%
2008	20,912	54.17%	17,352	44.95%	339	0.88%
2012	22,843	55.39%	17,879	43.35%	518	1.26%
2016	21,306	49.35%	19,105	44.25%	2,762	6.40%
2020	23,153	46.66%	25,553	51.50%	916	1.85%
2024	23,575	45.98%	26,742	52.16%	957	1.87%

== Economy ==
The median income for a household in the county was $55,594, and the median income for a family was $66,171. Males had a median income of $43,339 versus $27,016 for females. The per capita income for the county was $29,256. 6.40% of the population and 4.10% of families were below the poverty line. Out of the total people living in poverty, 7.30% were under the age of 18 and 4.80% were 65 or older.

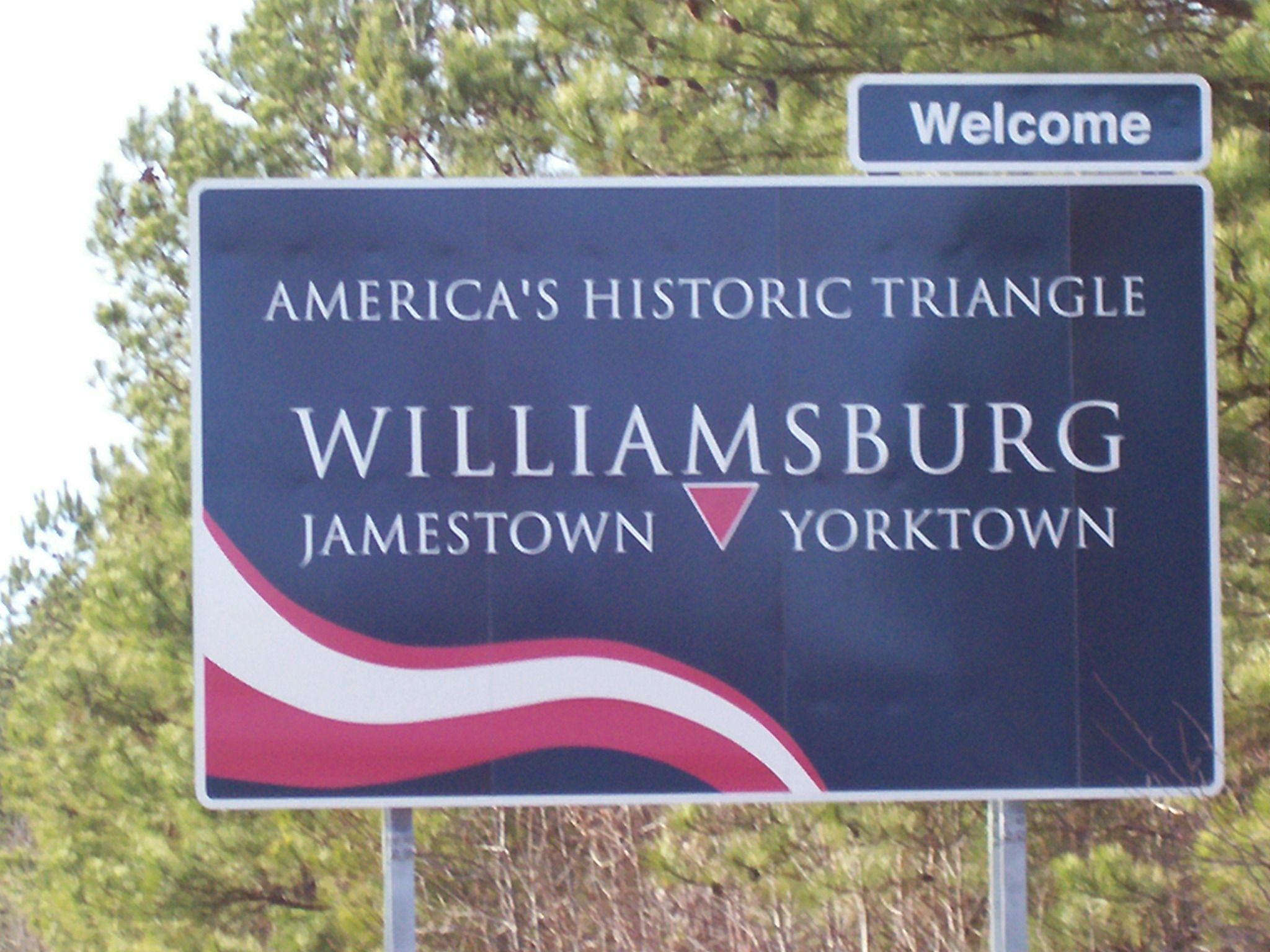
Historic Triangle sign on U.S. Route 60 just west of Grove, Virginia near Busch Gardens Williamsburg theme park in James City County outside Williamsburg

Jamestown and the Busch Gardens Williamsburg theme park, each located within the county, combine with Colonial Williamsburg and other area attractions to share the Historic Triangle's status as one of the most popular tourist destinations in the world. With dozens of restaurants, hotels and motels, and resort and recreational facilities, the hospitality industry brings major economic activity to the county.

=== Industry ===
James City County is located 45 minutes from the state capital in Richmond and from the metropolitan port city of Norfolk. It is also two and a half hours from the nation's capital in Washington, D.C.

A significant advantage for all import/export oriented commercial enterprises is James City County's close proximity to the deep-water ports of Hampton Roads. The county is within 40 minutes of the Port of Hampton Roads, the second largest commercial port on the East Coast with access to 75 international shipping lines.

Just to the east of the Anheuser-Busch properties, in the southeastern section of the county, on the south side of U.S. Route 60, the county's James River Enterprise Zone, an Urban Enterprise Zone is located in Grove. The 5.6-square-mile (15 km^{2}) area contains 2,400 acres (9.7 km^{2}) planned and zoned for industrial uses. James City County is actively seeking additional industrial business in this prime area of the county. The sites within a designated "enterprise zone" offer state and local incentives to businesses that locate in those zones, invest and create jobs.

Since the James River Enterprise Zone's inception in 1996, James River Commerce Center and Greenmount industrial parks have added tenants such as a Ball Manufacturing plant, an aluminum can plant which supplies Anheuser-Busch's Williamsburg brewery. A distribution center for Wal-Mart and a Haynes furniture warehouse are also located there. Recently, a masonry supply firm and a Volvo equipment rental facility have each announced plans to establish facilities. Carter Machinery Company, a Caterpillar dealership with 17 locations in Virginia and West Virginia, announced in May 2007 that is building a new sales and service center on a 23-acre (93,000 m^{2}) site. A large property adjacent to the James River which formerly housed BASF is currently vacant and other additional sites are also available for more development.

== Education ==
=== Elementary, secondary schools ===
The local public school division is jointly operated with City of Williamsburg, and is known as Williamsburg-James City County Public Schools (often abbreviated locally as "WJCC").

The area is also served by Walsingham Academy, Williamsburg Christian Academy, Williamsburg Montessori School, and Providence Classical School, each independent schools.

=== Higher education ===
A campus of Virginia Peninsula Community College is located near Warhill High School in the Lightfoot area.

Portions of the College of William and Mary (which is actually a university with post-graduate programs) are located in the county, while the main campus is located in Williamsburg.

== Transportation ==
The county is served by Interstate 64 and U.S. Route 60 along its east–west axis. A local transit bus service is offered by the county-owned Williamsburg Area Transit Authority (WATA), with a central route system hub at the Williamsburg Transportation Center. The county is within 45 minutes of Interstate 95 and has access to all major transportation arteries of the East Coast of the United States.

There are three international airports within a 45-minute drive from James City County: Richmond International Airport, Norfolk International Airport, and Newport News/Williamsburg International Airport. Depending on the often congested traffic conditions on I-64, driving times are subject to significant delays, especially for trips toward or through the Hampton Roads Bridge Tunnel.

=== U.S. Route 60 Grove-Lee Hall traffic ===
For several years in the early 21st century, a major project of James City County officials and Supervisor Bruce Goodson, who represents the Roberts Magisterial District, has been to improve U.S. Route 60 between Grove and Newport News to provide better (faster and more direct) access to Interstate 64 from the industrial sites in Grove which generate a considerable volume of truck traffic, and reduce the same on the existing roadway. Access for the industrial traffic to I-64 currently requires a drive of about 4 miles (6.4 km) in either direction on two-laned sections of U.S. 60 at non-highway speeds through residential areas, sharing the road with local traffic and school buses serving either the James River Elementary School's county-wide magnet program or alternatively, the large elementary school in the Lee Hall community in neighboring Newport News, as well as school buses for other schools going into and out of neighborhoods along the route in both communities.

On a historical note, a very similar roads issue was earlier visited in the 1930s, when the current parallel State Route 143 (Merrimack Trail) was built as part of a four-laned through-route alternative to U.S. 60 for increasing volumes of east–west through traffic in the area. Once again, options have been chosen so that the two-laned bucolic nature of Route 60 through the Grove and Lee Hall communities to be preserved without the major impact a widening project would have upon these historic communities.

==== Skiffe's Creek Connector ====
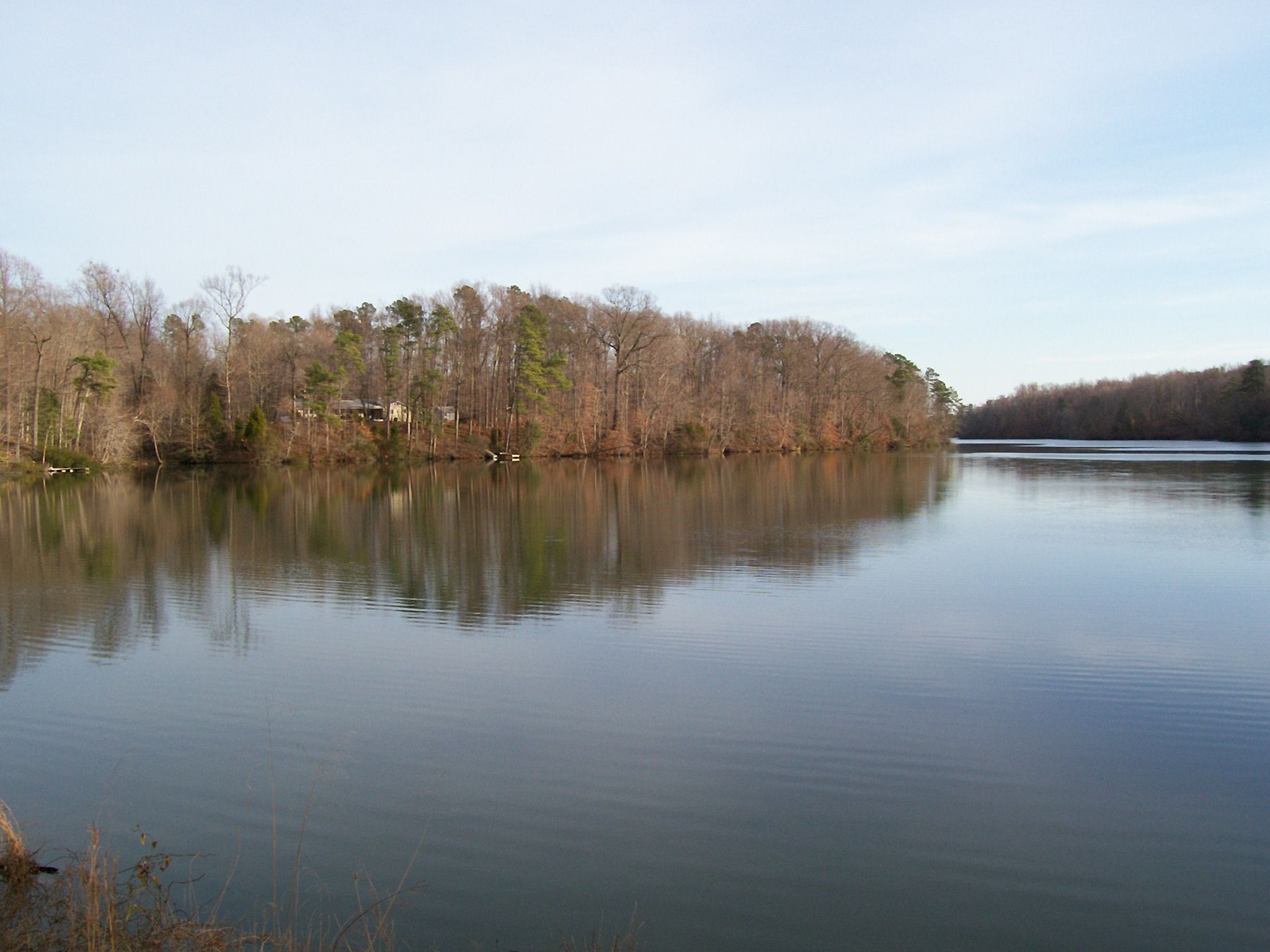
Skiffe's Creek Reservoir of the Newport News Waterworks, located at border of James City County and the City of Newport News, Virginia

In June 2007, Virginia's Commonwealth Transportation Board approved a major portion of the funding needed for the U.S. Route 60 relocation project. The relocated divided highway will begin on its western end near the current intersection of Blow Flats Road and, on a new alignment, will cross through the Greenmount Industrial Park to reach the Newport News city limits at the western edge of Skiffe's Creek Reservoir, part of the Newport News Waterworks. The portion of relocated roadway planned in James City County is being described as the Skiffe's Creek Connector.

A connection to State Route 143 and enhanced access to Interstate 64 nearby is also under consideration.

==== Newport News section ====
At the Newport News border, a new crossing of Skiffe's Creek will be built, and the remainder of the roadway will continue on a new alignment and effectively bypass the two lane portion of U.S. Route 60 through the historic Lee Hall community, rejoining the current highway near the cloverleaf intersection of Fort Eustis Boulevard near the entrance to Fort Eustis, where there is access four-laned access close by to exit 250 of Interstate 64 as well as an extant four-laned section of U.S. Route 60 which begins there and extends to the east as Warwick Boulevard. In a separate project, portions of Warwick Boulevard east of Fort Eustis in Newport News are currently being widened to six lanes.

=== Major highways ===
- I-64
- US 60
- SR 5
- SR 30
- SR 31
- SR 143
- SR 199
- SR 321
- SR 322
- SR 681
- SR 5000

== Military sites, bases ==
=== 17th century ===
A fort was underway at Jamestown very shortly after the colonists began establishing themselves there in May 1607. Archaeological work has been extensive, and is a major aspect of the current attractions there.

By 1634, the settlers of the Colony of Virginia had completed a palisade of approximately 6 miles (9.7 km) length across the peninsula, anchored by College Creek (earlier known as Archer's Hope Creek) and Queen's Creek, which led to the James and York rivers respectively. The goal was to protect the lower peninsula to the east from attacks by the Native Americans, who were still a threat in the area until after 1644.

The exact location of this line of wooden defenses has been lost to time. A portion was found during archaeological research on the property occupied by the home of Colonel John Page, a person prominent in establishing Middle Plantation and what became Bruton Parish Church during the second half of the 17th century. That site is now part of the Bruton Heights School Educational Center, and within Williamsburg's city limits. Although all of the Page home site was originally in York County, the nearly 2,500 feet (760 m) section across the property gives insight into its likely location southerly into James City County. Archaeologists noted its extremely straight orientation, rather following topological features such as ridges or ravines, giving another clue.

=== 19th century ===
During the American Civil War, the 1862 Peninsula Campaign was a move up the Virginia Peninsula from Fort Monroe at the eastern tip by Union troops in an attempt to take the Confederate capital of Richmond. The Williamsburg Line, a third Confederate line of defense, extended across the Peninsula just east of town. Construction of the line, largely consisting of a series of 14 redoubts, was overseen by College of William and Mary President Benjamin S. Ewell, who had joined in the defense of Williamsburg. At Redoubt # 6, near the center, Fort Magruder, an earthen fortification, was located at a strategic point at the juncture of the roads from Lee's Mill and Yorktown to Williamsburg.

At Fort Magruder, a few earthworks and a small memorial remain along present-day Penniman Road in a residential area. In early 2006, Riverside Health System donated 22 acres (89,000 m^{2}) of the 350 acres (1.4 km^{2}) of land that it had bought from Colonial Williamsburg in 2004, to create a public park. The land, located about 1.5 miles (2.4 km) south of Fort Magruder (towards the James River), includes two redoubts that were part of the line of defenses made up of 14 redoubts, of which Fort Magruder was the largest.

=== 20th century ===
The Grove Community in the southeastern end of the county was populated with many African-American families displaced during World War I and World War II as the military reservations for the Naval Weapons Station Yorktown and Camp Peary respectively were created on the sites of the lost towns of Lackey and Magruder.

At the southwestern edge of Grove, the U.S. Army's Camp Wallace operated from 1918 to 1971. It was a satellite facility of Fort Eustis, which was established as Camp Abraham Eustis in neighboring Warwick County in 1918. In this hilly terrain, the base had its Upper Artillery Range. Some years after World War II, Camp Wallace became was the site of the Army's first installation of its aerial tramway. The Camp Wallace property became part of the Anheuser Busch developments beginning in the 1970s.

=== 21st century ===
No military installations are currently headquartered in the county. Small portions of Camp Peary and the Yorktown Naval Weapons Station are located in James City County, although most portions of each of these large installation are located in neighboring York County. Also, a very small portion of Fort Eustis property adjacent to Skiffe's Creek Reservoir and the southeastern tip of the Greenmount Industrial Park is also located in the county, although almost all of Fort Eustis is now located in the independent city of Newport News (which consolidated with the former Warwick County in 1958 to form the present large city).

== Communities ==
From the establishment of Jamestown in 1607 through the middle of the 20th century, James City County's economy was based largely on an agriculture, with many farms and substantial tracts of undeveloped forests. After the decline of Jamestown in the 18th century, commerce was centered on Williamsburg, which was partially located within the county. Small unincorporated towns and villages were scattered throughout. The end of the Civil War in 1865 saw some of the larger farms divided into smaller tracts as freedmen established new homesteads. With the arrival of the railroad in 1881, new access to transportation stimulated more growth. In some areas, Americans from other parts of the country relocated to the county attracted by the land prices and access to markets. One such group of Scandinavian heritage founded Norge.

=== Williamsburg ===
Although it received its royal charter as a "city incorporate" (actually a borough) in 1722, approximately one-half of Williamsburg was located in James City County for many years. The courthouse function was relocated there from Williamsburg, where the newer but historic 1770 Courthouse building was erected on Market Square. It was replaced in 1933 with a newer building nearby, and the 1770 building, substantially restored in 1989, is today part of Colonial Williamsburg's attractions. Much more recently, another larger facility at 5201 Monticello Avenue, near State Route 199 has become the Williamsburg-James City County Courthouse.

In Colonial times, and for about 100 years thereafter, Duke of Gloucester Street actually formed a prominent portion of the James City County border with York County, dividing the city down its primary street. Although Williamsburg was established literally along the border of the two counties, the unincorporated community of Yorktown along the riverfront area at the York River has always been the county seat of York County. In 1870, the Virginia General Assembly moved the county line so that Williamsburg was located entirely within James City County.

After a new Virginia state constitution was adopted in 1871, all incorporated cities in the state became independent cities that were politically independent of counties. Williamsburg was incorporated as a city in 1884, and separated from James City County. However, although politically separate entities, Williamsburg has remained the county seat of James City County. They continue to share many services, including courts, several constitutional officers and a joint public school system.

=== Unincorporated communities ===
There are no incorporated towns in the county. Unincorporated communities include:

- Centerville
- Croaker
- Diascund
- Ewell
- Five Forks
- Grove
- Indigo Park
- Jamestown
- Kingspoint
- Lightfoot
- Norge
- Toano
- Lanexa

Several areas of the county have Williamsburg mailing addresses.

Gated residential communities in the county include:

- Colonial Heritage
- Stonehouse at Millpond
- Ford's Colony
- Kingsmill
- Governor's Land

== See also ==
- National Register of Historic Places listings in James City County, Virginia
