= J. Blaine Blayton =

American physician (1905-2002)

- J. Blaine "Jim" Blayton (1905-2002) was a prominent African-American physician and civic leader in the Williamsburg, Virginia area for more than 50 years.
- Born: August 13, 1905; Indian Territory (now Oklahoma)
- Died: December 15, 2002 (aged 97)
- Education: Howard University
- Occupation: Physician

James Blaine Blayton (August 13, 1905 – December 15, 2002) was a prominent African-American physician in the Williamsburg, Virginia, area who lived in the Grove community in adjacent James City County. He practiced medicine for more than 50 years, and was also a civic leader.

== Biography ==
=== Early years ===
Blayton was born in Indian Territory (now Oklahoma) in 1905. He attended school in a two-room schoolhouse. He earned his undergraduate and medical degrees from Howard University in Washington, D.C.

=== Career ===
Dr. Blayton began his medical practice on the Virginia Peninsula during the first half of the 20th century. It was a time when Virginia was still highly racially segregated under the old Jim Crow laws which were later overturned by various U.S. Supreme Court decisions beginning in the 1950s and before the new civil rights laws of the 1960s were enacted.

He came to Williamsburg in 1931 from the city of Newport News during the Great Depression. He had been persuaded to set up his medical practice in the area by African-American residents who had been traveling to Newport News (about 30 miles distant) for medical appointments and care. He settled with his family in the Grove community in southeastern James City County, about 7 miles (11 km) east of Williamsburg.

During his half-century of practice, Dr. Blayton made house calls across a wide area of the Peninsula extending from New Kent County on the west to what was then Warwick County (now the western 2/3 of Newport News) on the east. During the administration of President Franklin D. Roosevelt, he served as a New Deal public health physician, and built the two-bed Blayton Maternity Hospital for the African-American community.

In 1952, Dr. Blayton opened a new 14-bed hospital with an emergency room in Williamsburg for African Americans because they were only allowed beds in the basement of the only other existing hospital in town, which was owned and operated by a white physician. He also opened a sandwich and soda shop to serve young people shut out of other facilities by segregation.

Dr. Blayton's Medical Center Clinic was the primary health care facility for the Williamsburg area's African-American citizens until the 1961 opening of the fully integrated Williamsburg Community Hospital, which Dr. Blayton helped to raise money to build. In 2006, the 1961 community facility was replaced by a 139-bed facility known as Sentara Williamsburg Regional Medical Center.

Dr. Blayton was appointed to the Virginia State Board of Medical Examiners by Virginia Governor Charles S. Robb.

In 1999, he was honored by the Williamsburg Community Health Foundation as one of the first three recipients of its Healthcare Heroes Recognition Award.

=== Civic roles ===
Dr. Blayton was also active in non-medical civic matters, such as education and recreation in the Williamsburg community. He served as the first African-American member of the James City County School Board. He was co-chairman of the campaign to raise $250,000 for the construction of Quarterpath Park, director of health and safety for the Peninsula Boy Scouts for 25 years, and a life member of the NAACP.

=== Personal life ===
In 1963, Dr. Blayton's son, Oscar H. Blayton, became the first African American to attend the College of William and Mary as an undergraduate. He graduated from Yale Law School in 1977 and opened a law practice in Williamsburg. Dr. Blaytons's daughter Betty Blayton-Taylor was a well-known and influential African American artist and educator in New York City. His other children include Barbara Richardson and James Blayton Jr. His grandchildren include Lisa Jackson, David Richardson, Shaun Blayton, and Omar Blayton. His great-grandchildren include and Coleman and Cleo Blaine Jackson, Bocar, Brandon, and Miles Richardson,

A residential facility for senior citizens was built in downtown Williamsburg and named the Blayton Building in Dr. Blayton's honor.

During its 2003 session, the Virginia General Assembly passed Resolution No. 844 "Celebrating the life of Dr. J. Blaine Blayton."

On October 2, 2010, the joint school board operated by Williamsburg and James City County dedicated its newest elementary school in his honor. The new J. Blaine Blayton Elementary School, with a capacity of 700 students, began enrolling its first students for the 2010-11 school year. Located on Jolly Pond Road, it was built at a cost of $17.2 million.
