= Martin's Hundred =

17th-century plantation

Coordinates: 37.1785°N 76.6115°W

Martin's Hundred was an early 17th-century plantation located along about ten miles (16 km) of the north shore of the James River in the Virginia Colony east of Jamestown in the southeastern portion of present-day James City County, Virginia. The Martin's Hundred site is described in detail in the eponymous book of Ivor Noel Hume first published in 1979.

== History ==
Martin's Hundred was one of the subsidiary "particular" plantations of the joint-stock Virginia Company of London. It was owned by a group of investors known as The Society of Martin's Hundred, named for Richard Martin, recorder of the City of London, (not to be confused with his near-contemporary Richard Martin who was the father of Jamestown councilor John Martin). Sir John Wolstenholme was among its investors. William Harwood was governor of Martin's Hundred settlement.

The Society of Martin's Hundred obtained a grant for 80,000 acres from its parent company in 1618. In October of that year, about 250 settlers departed for the plantation, arriving in Virginia about January or March, 1619.

Like all of the land the English claimed along the river, the plantation's 21,500 acres (87 km^{2}) had been part of the domain of the Powhatans, an association of Native American Tidewater tribes formed at the end of the 16th century by the Indian Chief Powhatan. On March 22, 1622, the Powhatans rose to kill as many English as they could surprise in their homes and fields. From near modern Richmond to Newport News, the Powhatans burned and looted dwellings and desecrated corpses. Death counts vary, but about 400 English died. Martin's Hundred, the plantation hardest hit, lost more than 50, perhaps as many as 70.

The Indian massacre of 1622 nearly accomplished its purpose. The English withdrew from their scattered settlements to the safety of Jamestown for a time.

Martin's Hundred was represented in the House of Burgesses from 1619 until 1634, when Virginia's counties were formed.

=== Wolstenholme Towne ===
The administrative center of Martin's Hundred (hundred defined a subdivision of an English county) was Wolstenholme Towne, a fortified settlement of rough cabins. During the 1622 massacre, Wolstenholme Towne's death toll was not separated in the death rolls. Wolstenholme Towne was resettled a year or more later but abandoned sometime after 1645.

== Carter's Grove Plantation ==
It may be that no trace of the town was apparent by the time planter Robert "King" Carter bought the land about 1709. It later became known as Carter's Grove Plantation and descended through multiple owners until 1964, when it was acquired by the Colonial Williamsburg Foundation, which operates the many restored colonial-period capital city attractions in Williamsburg. In 1970 Ivor Noël Hume, Director, Department of Archaeology for The Colonial Williamsburg Foundation, started excavating and found 23 grave sites dating from the second quarter of the 17th century.

In 2007, the Colonial Williamsburg Foundation sold Carter's Grove - with conservation easements designed to protect the house and most of the land – to Halsey Minor. After Minor's company filed for bankruptcy in 2011, the Colonial Williamsburg Foundation took over the needed repairs and then put the house on the market. There were no offers, and in the spring of 2014, the Foundation won the property at auction.

In September 2014, the Foundation sold Carter's Grove to Samuel Mencoff for $7.5 million (~$9.76 million in 2024). Mencoff is known for preservation projects, and Colin Campbell, the president of the foundation, stated, "The property is in the hands of somebody who is going to preserve it, take care of it." Mencoff stated that he and his team would work closely with Colonial Williamsburg to preserve Carter's Grove.

== Colonial Williamsburg ==
What remained of Wolstenholme Towne and its dead lay forgotten beneath the plantation's fields and woodlands until 1976, when archaeologists discovered the site. It and interpretive slave quarters from a later period were partially restored to represent their respective periods during the almost 400-year history of the property, greatly adding to the attraction's features for tourists.

However, the main house at Carter's Grove is furnished as it was in 1928, and therefore, while of increasing historic value, does not fit well into the earlier time eras which are the main focus of Colonial Williamsburg presentations.

During a period of declining attendance at Colonial Williamsburg attractions, the foundation determined the substantial distance from the main restored area (7 miles) to be an additional contributing factor to the need to reevaluate its role. On January 2, 2003, the site was closed to the public to save operating funds. Closer to the downtown Williamsburg area, Colonial Williamsburg now operates the Great Hopes Plantation interpretive site which can easily be reached by the pedestrian traffic from the restored area, and continues the story of the lives of the slaves who played a vital role in building Colonial Virginia.

A future role of Carter's Grove as an attraction had not yet been determined as of October, 2006. Certain support functions of Colonial Williamsburg continue to operate on the Carter's Grove property, however, and the property is secured and maintained, even though not open to the public.

In early 2008 archaeologists from Colonial Williamsburg finished surveying and testing various areas across Carter's Grove. Colonial Williamsburg sold the Carter's Grove plantation, Martin's Hundred, and the museum to a private individual whose use of the property remains unknown. Colonial Williamsburg archival staff are still allowed within the museum since some artifacts still reside there and must be preserved.

Carter's Grove Country Road, a narrow but paved bucolic link to the Historic Area of Colonial Williamsburg, was damaged during Hurricane Isabel in late 2003, and has been closed to traffic since then.

A substantial portion of Martin's Hundred land is now occupied by the community of Grove along U.S. Route 60 east of the Busch Gardens Williamsburg theme park.

== Notes ==
=== References ===
- Brown, Alexander (1890). The Genesis of the United States: A Narrative of the Movement in England, 1605-1616. Houghton, Mifflin.
