= Ivor Noël Hume =

Ivor Noël Hume, OBE (30 September 1927 – 4 February 2017) was a British-born archaeologist who did research in the United States. A former director of Colonial Williamsburg’s archaeological research program and the author of more than 20 books, he was heralded by his peers as the "father of historical archaeology".

== Biography ==
Born in London, Noël Hume studied at Framlingham College, Suffolk and St. Lawrence College, Kent. He spent a short stint in the British Army during World War II, and as an assistant stage manager for a London theatre, before deciding to pursue archaeology as a career and joining the staff of Guildhall Museum in London where he worked from 1949 to 1957. His early speciality was 17th and 18th century wine bottles. He became chief archaeologist and director of the expanded Colonial Williamsburg archaeology program in 1957 and served in that capacity for the next three decades.

Noël Hume discovered and excavated the 17th century site of Wolstenholme Towne, at Carter's Grove Plantation just east of Williamsburg. Wolstenholme at Martin's Hundred was one of the early Virginia settlements after Jamestown and evidence of the 1622 Indian attack was found in the deaths of several of the citizens. Major excavations in Colonial Williamsburg included work at the original site of Eastern State Hospital, conducted in 1972 — which was the largest site work since the excavation of the Governor's Palace in 1930 — the James Geddy House and shop, Weatherburn's Tavern and outbuildings and the cabinetmakers shop. Noël Hume retired as Director of the Department of Archaeological Research at Colonial Williamsburg in 1988. In retirement, he directed an excavation (1991–92) at the Fort Raleigh National Historic Site on Roanoke Island, North Carolina, and discovered Thomas Harriot's 1585–86 "science center" there.

== Scholarship and publicity ==
Noël Hume's work is noted for the effort to put the social life and economic overtones of history into the discoveries unearthed through archaeological examination — thus: historical archaeology. When he began his career, "historical archaeology did not exist as an academic discipline. It fell to Noël Hume's books, lectures, and television presentations to help bring it to the forefront of his profession, where it stands today," the University of Virginia Press said in its fall 2010 catalogue, which features his autobiography, A Passion for the Past: The Odyssey of a Transatlantic Archaeologist. Carmel Schrire, Rutgers University, author of Digging through Darkness: Chronicles of an Archaeologist, said of Noël Hume's book: "Noël Hume is a household name. This book should be a professional classic, to be read alongside other memoirs like those of Grahame Clark, Glyn Daniel, Gertrude Caton-Thompson, and Mortimer Wheeler." In 1991 Noël Hume received the J. C. Harrington Award, presented by the Society for Historical Archaeology for his life-time contributions to archaeology centered on scholarship.

On 17 June 1963, Noël Hume appeared as a "central character" on an episode of the game show To Tell the Truth.

Noël Hume died in Virginia on 4 February 2017.

== Works ==
=== Books ===
- Archaeology in Britain (1953), W. & G. Foyle.
- Tortoises, Terrapins and Turtles (1954), W. & G. Foyle.
- Treasure in the Thames (1956), Muller.
- Great Moments in Archaeology (1958), Social Science.
- Excavations at Rosewell in Gloucester County, Virginia, 1957–1959 (1962), Smithsonian Institution.
- Here Lies Virginia: An Archaeologist's View Of Colonial Life And History (1963), Knopf.
- Excavations at Clay Bank in Gloucester County, Virginia, 1962–1963 (1966), Smithsonian Institution.
- Excavations at Tutter's Neck in James City County, Virginia, 1960–1961 (1966), Smithsonian Institution.
- 1775: Another Part of the Field (1966), Eyre & Spottiswoode
- Historical Archaeology (1968), Knopf.
- A Guide to Artifacts of Colonial America (1969), Knopf.
- Glass in Colonial Williamsburg's Archaeological Collections (1969), Colonial Williamsburg Foundation.
- Pottery and Porcelain in Colonial Williamsburg's Archaeological Collections (1969), Colonial Williamsburg Foundation.
- Archaeology and Wetherburn's Tavern (1969), Colonial Williamsburg Foundation.
- The Wells of Williamsburg: Colonial Time Capsules (1969), Colonial Williamsburg Foundation.
- James Geddy and Sons: Colonial Craftsmen (1970), Colonial Williamsburg Foundation.
- Williamsburg Cabinetmakers: The Archaeological Evidence (1971), Colonial Williamsburg Foundation.
- All the Best Rubbish: Being an Antiquary's Account of the Pleasures and Perils of Studying & Collecting Everyday Objects from the Past (1974), Harper & Row.
- Digging for Carter's Grove (1974), Colonial Williamsburg Foundation.
- Early English Delftware from London to Virginia (1977), Colonial Williamsburg Foundation.
- Martin's Hundred: The Discovery of a Lost Colonial Virginia Settlement (1982), Knopf.
- Discoveries in Martin's Hundred (1983), Colonial Williamsburg Foundation.
- The Virginia Adventure: Roanoke to James Towne, An Archaeological and Historical Odyssey (1994), Knopf.
- Shipwreck! History from the Bermuda Reefs (1995), Capstan Publications.
- In Search of This & That: Tales from an Archaeologist's Quest — Selected Essays from the Colonial Williamsburg Journal (1996), Colonial Williamsburg Foundation.
- If These Pots Could Talk: Collecting 2,000 years of British Household Pottery (2001), Chipstone.
- The Archaeology of Martin's Hundred: Part 1: Interpretive Studies (2001), University of Pennsylvania Museum of Archaeology and Anthropology / Colonial Williamsburg Foundation.
- The Archaeology of Martin's Hundred: Part 2: Artifact Catalog (2001), University of Pennsylvania Museum of Archaeology and Anthropology / Colonial Williamsburg Foundation.
- Civilized Men: A James Towne Tragedy (2005), Dietz Press.
- Something from the Cellar: More of This & That — Selected Essays from the Colonial Williamsburg Journal (2005), Colonial Williamsburg Foundation.
- Wreck and Redemption: William Strachey's Saga of the Sea Venture and the Birth of Bermuda – in a Newly Discovered Manuscript (2009), Port Hampton Press.
- A Passion for the Past: The Odyssey of a Transatlantic Archaeologist (2010), University of Virginia Press.
- Belzoni: The Giant Archaeologists Love to Hate (2011), University of Virginia Press.
- Excavating Fort Raleigh: Archaeology at England's First Colony (2024), The History Press.

== Accolades ==
Noël Hume was recognised by Queen Elizabeth II of Great Britain in 1993 and was made an Officer of the Order of the British Empire (O.B.E.) for service to the British cultural interests in Virginia.
