= Carter's Grove =

Historic plantation in Virginia, United States

- U.S. National Register of Historic Places
- U.S. National Historic Landmark
- Virginia Landmarks Register
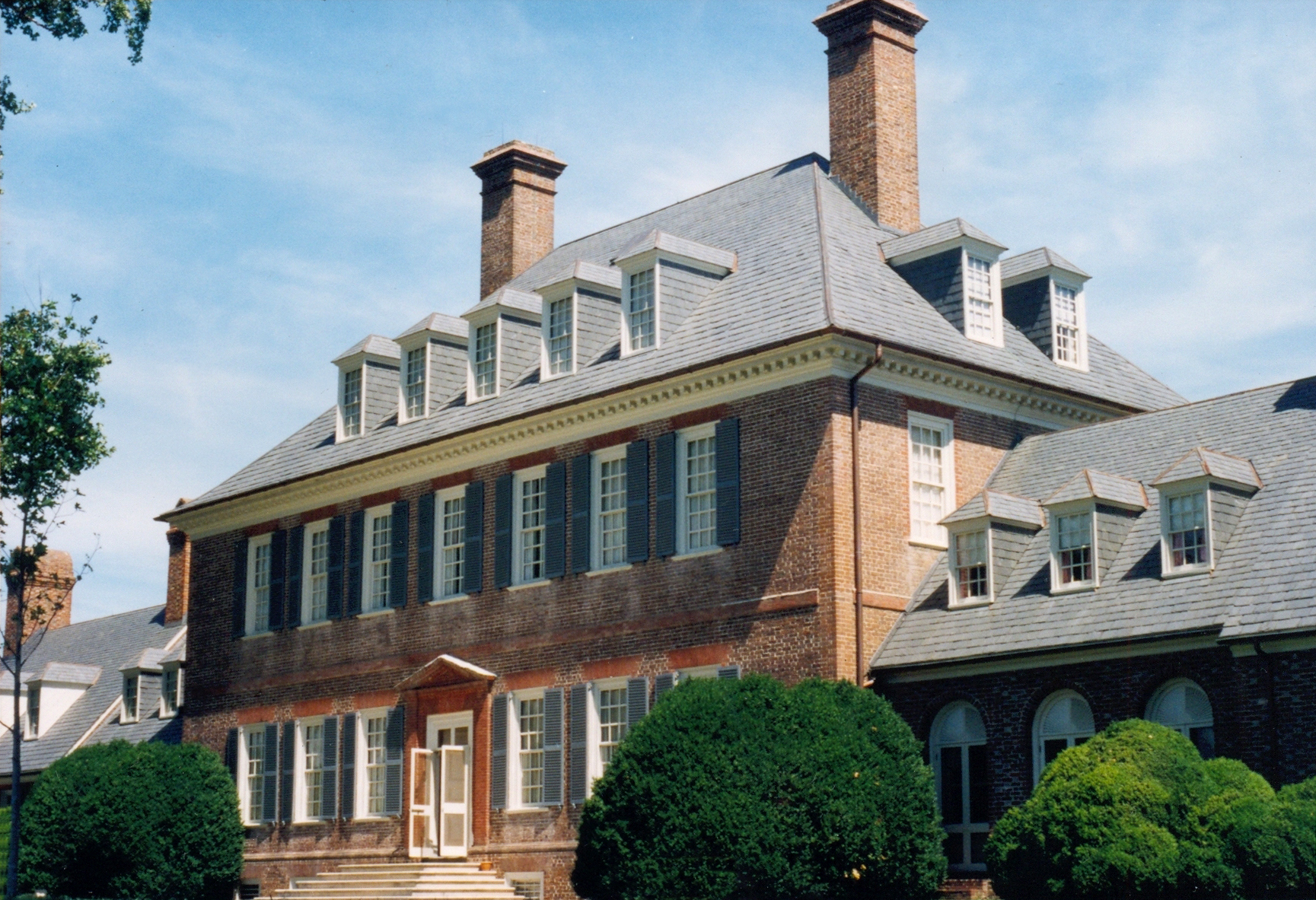

- Location within Virginia Location within the United States
- Interactive map showing the location of Carter’s Grove
- Nearest city: Williamsburg, Virginia
- Coordinates: 37°12′25.13″N 76°37′29.35″W
- Built: 1750
- Architect: David Minetree; Richard Taliaferro
- Architectural style: Colonial
- NRHP reference No.: 69000249
- VLR No.: 047-0001

Significant dates
- Added to NRHP: November 12, 1969
- Designated NHL: April 15, 1970
- Designated VLR: September 9, 1969

Carter's Grove, also known as Carter's Grove Plantation, is a 750-acre (300 ha) plantation located on the north shore of the James River in the Grove Community of southeastern James City County in the Virginia Peninsula area of the Hampton Roads region of Virginia in the United States.

The plantation was built for Carter Burwell, grandson of Robert "King" Carter, and was completed in 1755. It was probably named for both the prominent and wealthy Carter family and nearby Grove Creek. Carter's Grove Plantation was built on the site of an earlier tract known as Martin's Hundred which had first been settled by the English colonists around 1620. In 1976, an archaeological project discovered the site of Wolstenholme Towne, a small settlement downstream a few miles from Jamestown which had been developed in the first 15 years of the Colony of Virginia. The population of the settlement was decimated during the Indian massacre of 1622.

After hundreds of years of multiple owners and generations of families, and the death of the last resident in 1964, Carter's Grove was added to Colonial Williamsburg Foundation's (CW) properties through a gift from the Rockefeller Foundation in 1969.

Carter's Grove was open to tourists for many years but closed its doors to the public in 2003 while CW redefined its mission and role. Later that year, Hurricane Isabel seriously damaged Carter's Grove Country Road, which had linked the estate directly to the Historic Area, a distance of 8 miles (13 km), bypassing commercial and public roadways. CW then shifted some of the interpretive programs to locations closer to the main Williamsburg Historic Area and announced in late 2006 that it would be offered for sale under specific restrictive conditions, including a conservation easement.

In December 2007, CNET founder Halsey Minor acquired the Georgian style mansion and 476 acres (193 ha) for $15.3 million (~$22.2 million in 2024) and announced plans to use it as his home and for a thoroughbred horse breeding program with the Phipps family. The Virginia Outdoors Foundation and the Virginia Department of Historic Resources co-hold the conservation easement on 400 of the 476 acres. However, Minor never lived at the property and filed for personal bankruptcy in 2013. The Colonial Williamsburg Foundation submitted the only bid at the auction held on May 21, 2014, for the outstanding mortgage amount, and announced that it planned to resell it, with a price increased because of significant costs related to the sale, including over $600,000 (~$780,834 in 2024) in necessary repairs. Samuel M. Mencoff, a founder of Madison Dearborn Partners, acquired the property later in 2014.

== History ==
=== Wolstenholme Towne ===
In 1620, Wolstenholme Towne was built on the original land grant on the James River known as Martin's Hundred (in what is now James City County, Virginia). It was owned by an investment group of the Virginia Company of London but was later abandoned after losing many of its citizens in the Indian massacre of 1622.

=== Robert Carter ===
Robert Carter (1663–1732) aka "King" Carter, was born in Corotoman in Lancaster County, Virginia. Robert was married to Judith Armistead (1665–1699). He bought some of the land that had been Wolstenholme Towne, when his daughter, Elizabeth Carter (1688–1721) married. Robert retained ownership of the property and Elizabeth was entitled to the income produced by the land.

=== Elizabeth Carter ===
Elizabeth Carter of Corotoman, Lancaster County, Virginia (1688–1721) was married to Nathaniel Burwell (1680–1721), in 1709. Elizabeth and Nathaniel had a son: Carter Burwell (1716–1777).

=== Carter Burwell ===
Carter Burwell (1716–1777) inherited the property from his grandfather, and built the current house on what was by then a 1,400-acre (570 ha) estate. Carter married Lucy Ludwell Grymes (1720-?). Lucy was the daughter of John Grymes (1691–1749) and Lucy Ludwell (1698–1748). Carter and Lucy lived in the completed house for six months before Carter died in 1777. Carter had a son, Nathaniel Burwell (1750–1814), who married Susanna Grymes (1752–1788) on November 28, 1772.

=== Nathaniel Burwell ===
Colonel Nathaniel Burwell (1750–1814) moved to Carter's Grove in 1771 and raised corn and wheat. Carter's Grove remained in the Burwell family until 1838 when it was sold to Thomas Wynne, grandson of John Wynne (1705-1774). By the time of the American Revolution, more than 450 enslaved persons lived at Carter's Grove.

=== Edwin G. Booth ===
Edwin Gilliam Booth (1810-1886) bought the Carter's Grove property in 1879, two years before Americans celebrated the hundredth anniversary of George Washington's victory at Yorktown nearby. Booth renovated the mansion and used it to celebrate a reconciliation theme. A "New South" advocate and tireless supporter of railroads and new industry, Booth painted the interior red, white and blue and planted a grove of locust trees on the approach from the land. He also added elaborate porches to the mansion's front and rear. A Virginia lawyer, plantation owner and prewar Whig delegate in the Virginia House of Delegates for Nottoway County, Booth Sr. spent much of the war based in Philadelphia with his second wife and providing assistance to Confederate prisoners. Both his sons who reached adulthood had been Confederate officers, Archer Jones Booth dying in 1864. Dr. Edwin G. Booth Jr. (1839-1922) survived the war in part because the Confederate ship on which he was a naval surgeon was captured in the Battle of Mobile Bay. He inherited Carter's Grove and after the turn of the century bought the George Wythe house in Williamsburg, where he died. His eldest daughter Lucy married Dr. Hugh Smith Cummings, who served as the fifth U.S. Surgeon General (1920-1935). The family's papers are held by the library of the University of Virginia.

=== T. Percival Bisland ===
New York businessman and investor in silver mining bought Carter's Grove in 1907. He rehabilitated the property with the assistance of New York architect William W. Tyree, removing one of the Booth era porches, adding window screens, indoor toilets, central heat and a modern kitchen in a flanking dependency joined to the mansion by an enclosed gallery. However, by the fall of 1910, both he and his wife died, so the property languished under absentee owners.

=== Archibald McCrea ===
Archibald McCrea, a Pittsburgh industrialist, bought the dilapidated mansion in 1928. He and his wife, Mary "Mollie" Corling (Johnston) Dunlop McCrea, originally of Petersburg, restored the mansion, and substantially modernized and expanded it under the guidance of Richmond architect Duncan Lee who designed several of the stately homes along Monument Avenue and later, the Colonial Revival mansion at Evelynton Plantation. These renovations significantly changed the appearance of the mansion. As originally built Carter's Grove had a low hip roof similar to Wilton, the McCreas had the roof raised and added dormer windows for additional rooms on the upper floor which gave the house a roofline similar to the mansion at Westover Plantation.

Archibald McCrea died in 1937, but his widow lived on at Carter's Grove another 25 years. Soon after her death, it was purchased from her estate and transferred to the Colonial Williamsburg Foundation.

== Colonial Williamsburg Foundation ==
From 1969 to 2007, Carter's Grove was operated by the Colonial Williamsburg Foundation, and was open to the public for most of those years. In the 1970s, archaeological discoveries uncovered the remains of the circa 1620 Wolstenholme Towne fortified settlement on the property (which was substantially wiped out by the Indian massacre of 1622, and soon thereafter abandoned). Wolstenholme Towne and slave quarters from a later period were partially restored to represent their respective periods during the almost 400-year history of the property.

It was declared a National Historic Landmark in 1971.

However, while inclusion of a Colonial-era plantation was part of John D. Rockefeller, Jr.'s aspirations for Colonial Williamsburg, the practical challenge with Carter's Grove was that it did not connect directly with the focus on presenting Revolutionary-era Williamsburg and was unable to attract sufficient audiences. Audience development—the appeal to rising generations—is fundamental to the Foundation.

On January 2, 2003, the site was closed to the public to save operating funds saying:

- The main house at Carter's Grove is furnished as it was in 1928, and does not fit into the time period of Colonial Williamsburg.
- Colonial Williamsburg is 7 miles (11 km) away and few visitors make the journey to the plantation.

An additional hardship in the physical linking between the Historic Area of Colonial Williamsburg and Carter's Grove Plantation was severe weather damage to bucolic Carter's Grove Country Road in James City County during Hurricane Isabel later in 2003. The storm destroyed many trees along the paved road, which is located almost entirely on private property, and required much of it to be semi-permanently closed, pending funding for costly repairs. (Since the hurricane, the Carter's Grove Plantation property continued to be physically accessible by its main entrance on U.S. Route 60 in Grove, Virginia, although still closed to the public).

In 2006, completing a four-year evaluation, CW concluded that the best approach to Carter's Grove was to offer it in a fully protected sale. This was to include restrictions to ensure protection of the James River view shed, wetlands and forest, exterior and interior architecture, and archaeological sites on the property as well as prohibit residential and commercial development. On March 31, 2007, Colonial Williamsburg announced that it would be listing Carter's Grove with a real estate company based in Charlottesville, Virginia, for $19 million (~$27.6 million in 2024).

== 2007 and beyond ==
Colonial Williamsburg put Carter's Grove up for sale, asking $19 million.

On December 19, 2007, it was publicly announced that Carter's Grove, its Georgian style mansion and 476 acres (1.93 km^{2}) had been acquired for $15.3 million by CNET founder Halsey Minor, a Virginia native and entrepreneur. Per the press release from the Colonial Williamsburg Foundation the new owner "plans to use the mansion as a private residence and use the site as a center for a thoroughbred horse-breeding program."

Colonial Williamsburg did not include the contents of the plantation in the sale. The contents, instead, were sold May 17–18, 2008, by Northeast Auctions at auction in Portsmouth, New Hampshire.

A conservation easement on the mansion and 400 of the 476 acres (1.93 km^{2}) is co-held by the Virginia Outdoors Foundation and the Virginia Department of Historic Resources.

Carter's Grove Country Road was never fully restored after the damage from Hurricane Isabel in 2003. The easternmost portion remains part of the Carter's Grove proper, subject to land conservation covenants. The portion west to Mounts Bay Road reverted to Kingsmill Properties. The section west of Mounts Bay Road continues to be owned by Colonial Williamsburg.

Halsey Minor made no changes to Carter's Grove, and he stopped making mortgage payments in 2010, announcing he owed $12 million (~$16.8 million in 2024) in debts. Carter's Grove LLC went into bankruptcy and a federal judge appointed Stan Samorajczyk as trustee to make repairs and sell the property. The leaking roof and inoperable environmental control system had caused deterioration. Thus, in 2013 the Colonial Williamsburg Foundation and Virginia Department of Historic Resources supervised repairs by The Roofing & Remodeling Company, including replacing leaky flashing around 40 dormers, six chimneys and eight brick walls, installing new copper flashings in accordance with National Slate Association specifications; replaced flashings on the ridges and hips of the roof, as well as replacing some slates. The Martin's Hundred artifacts had been feared lost, but were saved.

In February 2012 Dominion Virginia Power gave notice that the company planned to construct a 7+ mile, 500 kV Extra-High Voltage transmission line from their Surry Nuclear Power Plant in Surry, Virginia, across the James River to a planned switching station, just east of Carter's Grove. The river crossing will be supported on 17 lattice-type transmission towers, four of which will stand 295' above the river surface, nearly as tall as the Statue of Liberty. This has sparked significant opposition from historic preservationists who are concerned that these towers will mar the view from Carters Grove, and the nearby Colonial Parkway.

== See also ==
- List of National Historic Landmarks in Virginia
- National Register of Historic Places listings in James City County, Virginia
