= Halsey Minor =

American businessman (born 1964)

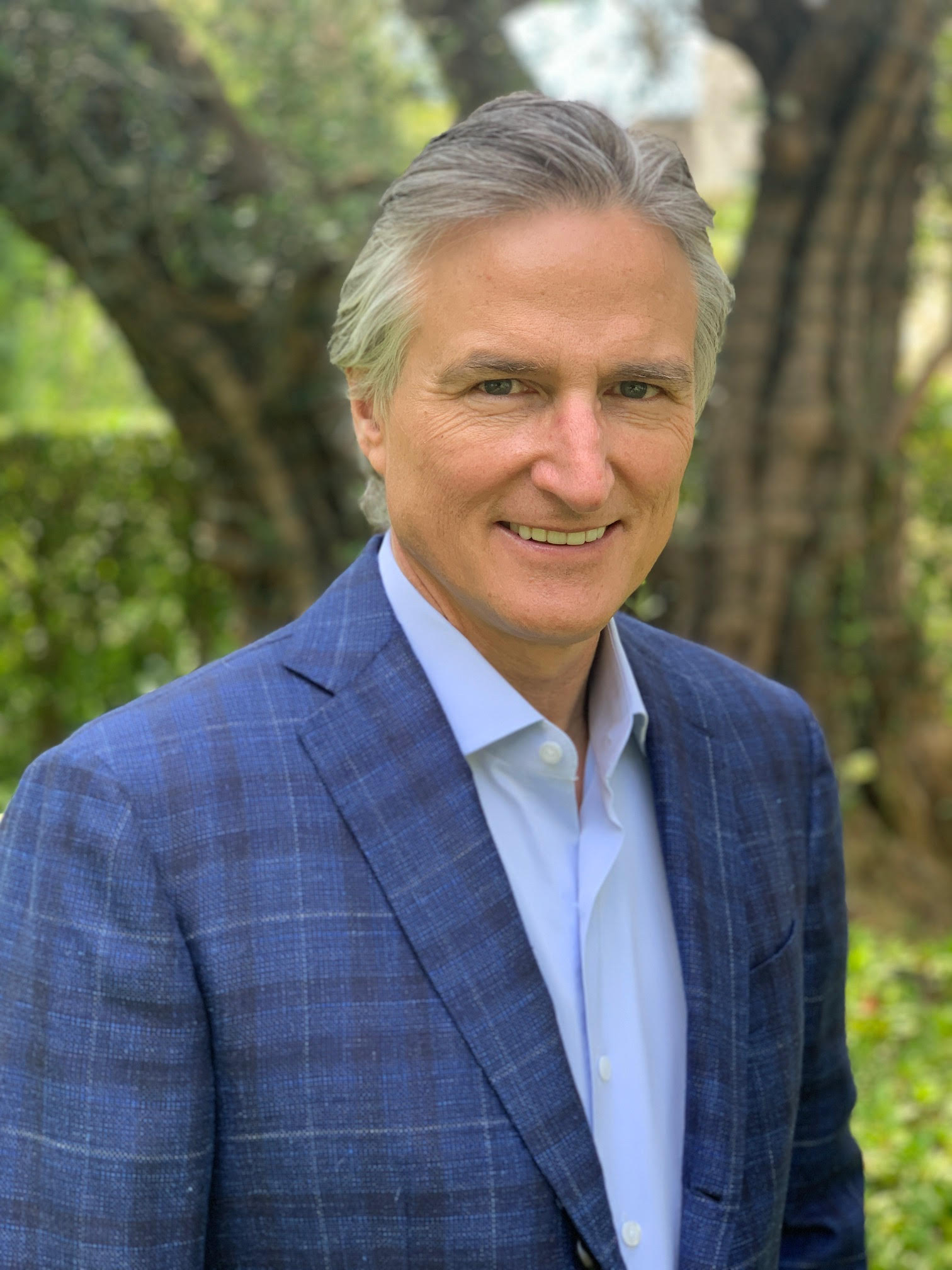
- Minor in 2019
- Born: Halsey McLean Minor Sr; December 6, 1964 (age 61); Charlottesville, Virginia, U.S.
- Education: University of Virginia
- Occupation: Entrepreneur
- Known for: Starting CNET

Halsey Minor (born December 6, 1964) is an American entrepreneur who founded CNET in 1993. He also founded or co-founded Live Planet, VideoCoin, Vivid Labs, Salesforce.com, Google Voice, OpenDNS, and Vignette.

Minor founded the venture capital firm Minor Ventures. In June 2013, he filed for bankruptcy but continued to be involved in the capital or management of some technology companies.

== Career ==
=== Early career ===
Minor moved to New York City for his first job out of college working for Merrill Lynch as an investment banker. While there, he created a spinoff called Global Publishing Corporation that focused on sharing information and training materials across Merrill's IT infrastructure. This was followed by a project with coworker Jeff Bezos to develop software that would have provided custom news feeds based on each user's job description and interests. Merrill Lynch signed a three-year contract to fund the news feed project, then cancelled due to Merrill's poor financial results.

Afterwards, Minor spent a year doing consulting work for EastWest Network, which published magazines typically found on airplanes. He was working on a startup idea using satellites to distribute training content at corporations before a friend offered him a job at a recruiting firm called Russ Reynolds Associates, where he worked as an executive recruiter.

=== CNET ===
Minor conceived of the idea for CNET in 1992. He quit his job to start CNET that December with cofounder and former classmate Shelby Bonnie. Bonnie provided $25,000 in seed funding, and Minor obtained some other funding through friends and family members.

Initially, Minor was not able to get any deals with broadcasters to license CNET's TV shows on technology. By 1994, CNET was not able to make payroll. However, that year Minor convinced Microsoft cofounder Paul Allen to invest $5 million for a 20% interest in the company. Also, USA Network bought the rights to CNET's TV show "Central TV."

Minor bought domains like news.com, tv.com, search.com, shopper.com, and download.com. Over time, he focused more on CNET as an internet publication rather than a broadcast business, culminating in the launch of CNET.com in June 1995. CNET.com later became one of the most highly-trafficked websites on the internet. Minor and CNET also helped create the Internet Advertising Bureau (now known as the Interactive Advertising Bureau) and influenced the development of the online publishing industry. In July 1996, Minor took CNET public.

In 1997, Minor started a search engine called Snap.com with $25 million in funding and 150 employees from CNET. The decision to create a search engine was "universally booed" and caused CNET's stock to decline. Two years later Minor sold a 60% interest in Snap to NBC for $500 million. Investors widely criticized Minor in 1999 when he increased marketing spending from $400,000 to $100 million. However, in hindsight the campaign was later believed to have dramatically increased website traffic and recognition of the CNET brand.

Minor also sold some of CNET's technology rights to a company called Vignette, and he was earning revenue from CNET's advertising sales as the website grew in popularity. CNET joined the NASDAQ 100 and held interests in Vignette, Beyond.com, and others. By 1997, Minor's estimated net worth was $180.2 million. By 2000, his 11 percent interest in CNET was worth $495 million.

In March 2000, Minor retired from his CEO position. He remained on the CNET board as Chairman, while cofounder Shelby Bonnie took over as CEO.

=== Post CNET ===
According to Minor, he left CNET to focus on expanding Salesforce.com where he was the second-largest shareholder when the company went public. He was a cofounder of the company and had made an early investment of $19.5 million of his own money in 1999. He was also an early investor in Rhapsody.

Minor started a venture capital firm called 12 Entrepreneuring in February 2000, but it quickly dissolved due to internal discord and the decline of the tech sector after the dot-com bubble. He created another venture capital firm focused on software-as-a-service companies in 2004 called Minor Ventures. Minor Ventures did well and invested in Grand Central Communications, which was sold to Google in 2007 for $65 million and later became Google Voice. It installed OpenDNS at its San Francisco office, providing coaching, investments, and administrative support to get the company started.

=== Bankruptcy ===
Minor said he wanted to focus more on philanthropy and venture capitalism rather than being a CEO. He eventually lost his wealth on real estate, horse-breeding, legal disputes, and artwork, culminating in a bankruptcy filing in June 2013. Business Insider depicted the decline in Minor's wealth as "most likely due to his expensive taste in real estate, art, and horses". The Washington Post said it was a "post-divorce spending spree". Minor said it was a mix of the overall recession and banking crisis, as well as being depressed after his divorce and his father's suicide.

In 2007, Minor bought the Carter's Grove estate from the Colonial Williamsburg Foundation, which he planned to use as a retreat and for horse-breeding. Minor never lived at the estate and the vacant 18th century mansion began to fall into disrepair. After he filed for personal bankruptcy in 2013, the property was sold at auction. The Foundation submitted the only bid at the auction held on May 21, 2014, for the outstanding mortgage amount, and announced that it planned to resell it, with the price increased because of significant costs related to the sale, including over $600,000 in necessary repairs. Around the same time, Minor planned to build a $31 million luxury hotel in his hometown of Charlottesville, Virginia. A dispute formed between Minor and the bank he said was going to provide financing. The project was abandoned in 2009. Minor also invested in substantial real property assets that declined in value during the housing crisis.

Minor was involved in a series of legal disputes with Christie's and Sotheby's regarding art purchases. A jury awarded $8.57 million to Minor from Christie's for keeping his paintings when the paintings did not sell, despite promising to return them. Minor was required to pay for paintings he bid on but did not pay for. Sotheby's filed suit for $16.8 million in unpaid debt for paintings Minor bought. Minor counter-sued saying that Sotheby's routinely sold artwork without fully disclosing the paintings were still collateral for the prior owner's loans. On May 24, 2010, Minor was ordered to pay the $6.6 million+ he owed Sotheby's for backing out on his winning bids for three paintings.

When Minor declared bankruptcy, he owed $100 million and had only $50 million in remaining assets.

=== Other activities ===
In 2014, Minor founded and launched a bitcoin platform Bitreserve now called Uphold and a virtual reality company called Live Planet. In 2017, he created VideoCoin, which uses idle data center servers to support streaming video. In 2021, he founded the NFTs open platform Vivid Labs.
