= Indian massacre of 1622 =

Powhatan attack on the English colony of Virginia

Indigenous massacre of 1622
- Part of the British colonization of the Americas and the Anglo-Powhatan Wars
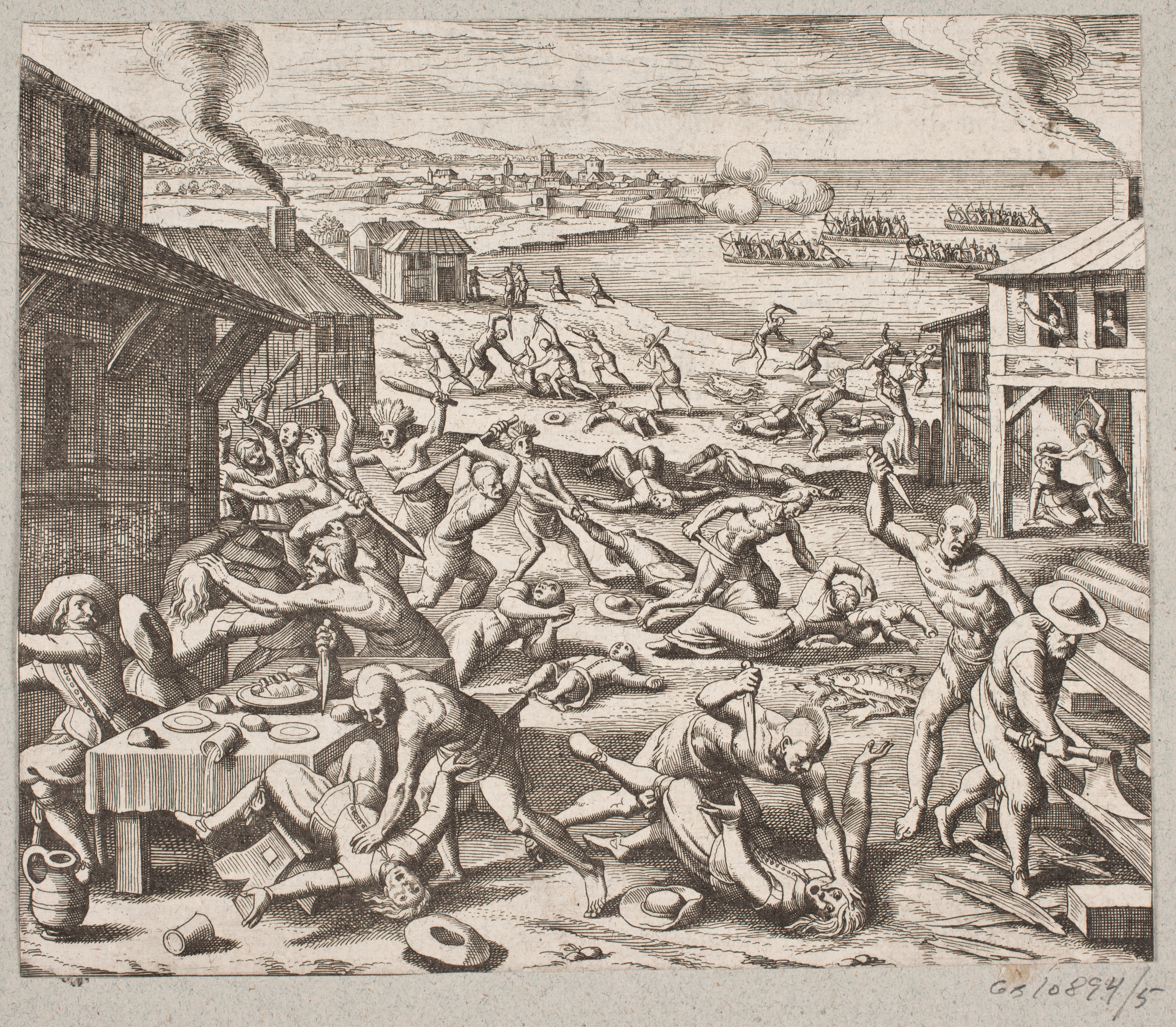
- 1628 engraving of the massacre
- Location: Colony of Virginia
- Date: 22 March 1622; 404 years ago (Note: Date of occurrence is notated and documented in the Old Style calendar: 1 April [O.S. 22 March] 1622.)
- Target: English settlers
- Attack type: Massacre
- Deaths: 347 settlers
- Perpetrator: Powhatan tribesmen
- Motive: Colonial encroachment on Powhatan lands

The Indigenous massacre of 1622 took place in the Pamunkey Colony of Virginia on March 22, 1621/22 (O.S./N.S.). The English explorer John Smith, though he was not an eyewitness, wrote in his History of Virginia that the Powhatan "came unarmed into our houses with deer, turkeys, fish, fruits, and other provisions to sell us." They then grabbed any tools or weapons available and killed all of the settlers they found, including men, women, and children of all ages. Opechancanough, Mamanatowick (leader) of the Powhatan Confederacy, led a series of coordinated surprise attacks that ended up killing a total of 347 people, a quarter of the population of the Colony of Virginia at the time.

Founded in 1607, Jamestown, Virginia, was the site of the first successful English settlement in North America and served as the capital of the Colony of Virginia. The town's tobacco economy, which quickly degraded the land and required new land, led to the settlers' constant expansion of habitation on Powhatan lands and provoked the Powhatan attack.

== Background ==
Upon the settlement's founding in 1607, the local indigenous tribes were willing to trade provisions to the Jamestown colonists for metal tools.

The Virginia Company of London's primary concern was the survival of the colony. The interests of the company required the colonists to maintain civil relations with the Powhatan. The Powhatan and the English realized that they could benefit from each other through trade once peace was restored. In exchange for food, the chief asked the colonists to provide him with metal hatchets and copper. Unlike John Smith, other early leaders of Virginia, such as Thomas Dale and Thomas Gates, based their actions on a different way of thinking. They were military men and considered the Powhatan Confederacy as essentially a "military problem."

The Powhatan were skeptical of the European settlers and hostile to outsiders, who they claimed had the purpose to "possess" the land. As Chief Powhatan said:

Your coming is not for trade, but to invade my people and possess my country…Having seen the death of all my people thrice… I know the difference of peace and war better than any other Country. [If he fought the English, Powhatan predicted], he would be so haunted by Smith that he can neither rest eat nor sleep, but his tired men must watch, and if a twig but break, every one cry, there comes Captain John Smith; then he must fly he know not whether, and thus with miserable fear end his miserable life.

=== First Anglo-Powhatan War ===
In 1610, the Virginia Company of London instructed Gates, the newly appointed colonial governor, to Christianise the natives and absorb them into the colony. As for Powhatan, Gates was told, "If you finde it not best to make him your prisoner yet you must make him your tributary, and all the other his weroances [subordinate chiefs] about him first to acknowledge no other Lord but King James."

When Gates arrived in Jamestown, he decided to evacuate the settlement because he considered the government's plan to be infeasible. As the colonists sailed down the James River towards the open sea, they were met by the incoming fleet of Thomas West, 3rd Baron De La Warr, off Mulberry Island. Taking command as governor, de la Warr ordered the fort to be reoccupied. He plotted the conquest of the surrounding tribes.

In July 1610, West sent Gates against the Kecoughtan. "Gates lured the Indians into the open by means of music-and-dance act by his drummer, and then slaughtered them." That was the First Anglo-Powhatan War. A group of colonists led by Samuel Argall captured Pocahontas, the daughter of Powhatan, and held her hostage until he would agree to their demands. The colonists "demanded that all Powhatan captives be released, return all English weapons taken by his warriors, and agree upon a lasting peace."

While Pocahontas was held by the English, she met John Rolfe, whom she later married. While in captivity, Pocahontas was taught the English language and customs and the Anglican religion. She was baptized as a Christian and took the name Rebecca. Rolfe wrote that the way to maintain peace between the Powhatan and the English was to marry Pocahontas, not "with the unbridled desire of carnal affection but for the good of the colony and the glory of God. Such a marriage might bring peace between the warring English and Powhatan, just as it would satisfy Pocahontas's desire." After they married, more peaceful relations were maintained for a time between the English colonists and the Powhatan Confederacy. Edward Waterhouse, secretary of the Virginia Company, wrote:

[S]uch was the conceit of firme peace and amitie, as that there was seldome or never a sword worne, and a Peece [firearm] seldomer, except for a Deere or Fowle.... The Plantations of particular Adventurers and Planters were placed scatteringly and stragglingly as a choyce veyne of rich ground invited them, and the further from neighbors held the better. The houses generally set open to the Savages, who were always friendly entertained at the tables of the English, and commonly lodged in their bed-chambers.

=== New governance ===
In 1618, after the death of Powhatan, his brother Opitchapam, a lame and quiet old man, became leader of the confederacy. Their youngest brother, Opechancanough, was probably the effective leader with Nemattanew, who was his friend, warchief, and advisor. Neither of the younger men believed that peaceful relations with the colonists could be maintained.

Perhaps in 1620–1621, Opitchapam retired or he was deposed (but possibly died in 1630), and he was succeeded by his youngest brother, Opechancanough. Nemattanew began to develop plans for the unavoidable war. Having recovered from their defeat commanding Pamunkey warriors during the First Anglo-Powhatan War, they planned to shock the English with an attack that would leave them contained in a small trading outpost, rather than expanding throughout the area with new plantations. In the spring of 1622, Nemattanew, one of Opechancanough's favorites, was shot, about a fortnight before the massacre, for the murder of a man named Morgan, whom he enticed from home on pretence of trade. This was the supposed motive for the Indians’ simultaneous surprise attacks on at least 31 separate English settlements and plantations, mostly along the James River, extending as far as Henricus.

== Jamestown forewarned ==
Jamestown was saved by the warning of an Indian youth living in the home of Richard Pace, one of the colonists. The youth woke Pace to warn him of the planned attack. Living across the river from Jamestown, Pace secured his family and rowed to the settlement to spread the alarm. Jamestown increased its defenses.

The name of the Indian who warned Pace is not recorded in any of the contemporary accounts. Although legend has named him "Chanco," that may be wrong. An Indian named "Chauco" is mentioned in a letter from the Virginia Council to the Virginia Company of London dated April 4, 1623. He is described not as a youth but as "one... who had lived much amongst the English, and by revealinge yt pl[ot] To divers appon the day of Massacre, saved theire lives...." "Chauco" may be the same person as "Chacrow," an Indian mentioned in a court record of 25 October 1624 as living with Lt. Sharpe, Capt. William Powell, and Capt. William Peirce "in the tyme of Sir Thos Dale's government," before 1616. The older Indian, Chauco, and the youth who warned Pace may have been conflated.

== Destruction of other settlements ==
During the one-day surprise attack, the Powhatan tribes attacked many of the smaller communities, including Henricus and its fledgling college for children of Natives and settlers alike. In the neighborhood of Martin's Hundred, 73 people were killed. More than half the population died in Wolstenholme Towne, where only two houses and a part of a church were left standing. In all, the Powhatan killed about four hundred colonists (a third of the white population) and took 20 women captive. The captives lived and worked as Powhatan Indians until they died or were ransomed. The settlers abandoned Falling Creek Ironworks, Henricus, and Smith's Hundred.

== Aftermath ==
After the attack, the surviving English colonists worked on a plan of action. "By unanimous decision both the council and planters it was agreed to draw people together into fewer settlements" for better defense. The colony intended to gather men together to plan a retaliatory attack, but this was difficult. Of the survivors "two-thirds were said to have been women and children and men who were unable to work or to go against the Indians."

Opechancanough withdrew his warriors, believing that the English would behave as Native Americans did when defeated: pack up and leave, or learn their lesson and respect the power of the Powhatan. After the event, Opechancanough told the Patawomeck, who were not part of the Confederacy and had remained neutral, that he expected "before the end of two Moones there should not be an Englishman in all their Countries."

In May 1623, plans were made with Opechancanough to negotiate peace and the release of the missing women. He released Mistress Boyse as a good-faith gesture, with the implied message that he would negotiate for the release of the remaining women. Captain Tucker and a group of musketeers met with Opechancanough and members of a Powhatan village along the Potomac River on May 22. In preparation for the event, Dr. John Pott prepared poisoned wine. Captain Tucker and others offered ceremonial toasts, and 200 Powhatans died after drinking the wine. Another 50 people were killed. Opechancanough escaped, but a number of tribal leaders were killed. From May to November that year, armed colonists attacked Powhatan settlements in the Tidewater region and targeted in particular their corn crops, which the Powhatan had planted "in great abundance." The raids not only led to the near collapse of Powhatan society but also provided enormous profits for corn profiteers in Jamestown.

In England, John Smith believed after the massacre that the settlers would not leave their plantations to defend the colony. He planned to return with a ship filled with soldiers, sailors, and ammunition to establish a "running Army" to fight the Powhatan. Smith's goal was to "inforce the Savages to leave their Country, or bring them in the feare of subjection that every man should follow their business securely." Smith, however, never returned to Virginia.

The settlers used the massacre as a justification for colonizing Powhatan land for the next decade. The historian Betty Wood writes:

What is usually referred to as the "Massacre of 1622," the native American attack that resulted in the death of 347 English settlers and almost wiped out Jamestown, which was the catalyst for the settlers actions. As far as the survivors of the Massacre of 1622 were concerned, by virtue of launching this unprovoked assault native Americans had forfeited any legal and moral rights they might previously have claimed to the ownership of the lands they occupied.

Following the massacre, Waterhouse, who never went to North America, published a pamphlet in which he claimed: "we, who hitherto have had possession of no more ground than their waste, and our purchase at a valuable consideration to their own contentment... may now by right of Warre, and law of Nations, invade the Country, and destroy them who sought to destroy us: whereby we shall enjoy their cultivated places." Waterhouse recommended in the pamphlet that the settlers of Jamestown adopt a variety of brutal tactics to defeat the Powhatan.

The Virginia Company embarked on a public relations campaign to spread the narrative about the 1622 Powhatan attack. The company controlled all types of communication leaving the colony.

=== Indian decline and defeat ===
In May 1624, Virginia lost its royal charter and was transformed into a crown colony by King James I. That meant that the Crown took direct authority, rather than allowing guidance by the Virginia Company of London. The Crown could exercise its patronage for royal favorites. Settlers continued to encroach on land of the Powhatan tribes, and the colonial government tended to change or ignore agreements with the natives that were no longer in the colony's interest. The tribes felt increasing frustration with the settlers.

The next major confrontation with the Powhatan, the Third Anglo-Powhatan War, occurred in 1644 and resulted in the deaths of several hundred colonists. While similar to the death toll in 1622, the loss a generation later represented less than ten percent of the population and had far less impact upon the colony. This time, the elderly Opechancanough, who was being transported by litter, was captured by the colonists. Imprisoned at Jamestown, he was killed by one of his guards.

His death marked the beginning of the increasingly precipitous decline of the once-powerful Powhatan. Its member tribes eventually left the area entirely, gradually lived among the colonists, or lived on one of the few reservations established in Virginia. Most of them were also subject to incursion and seizure of land by the ever-expanding European population.

In modern times, seven tribes of the original Powhatan Confederacy are recognized in the Commonwealth of Virginia. The Pamunkey and Mattaponi still have control of their reservations established in the 17th century, each of which is between the rivers of the same names within the boundaries of present-day King William County.
