= 27th Construction Company =

Construction Company during World War I

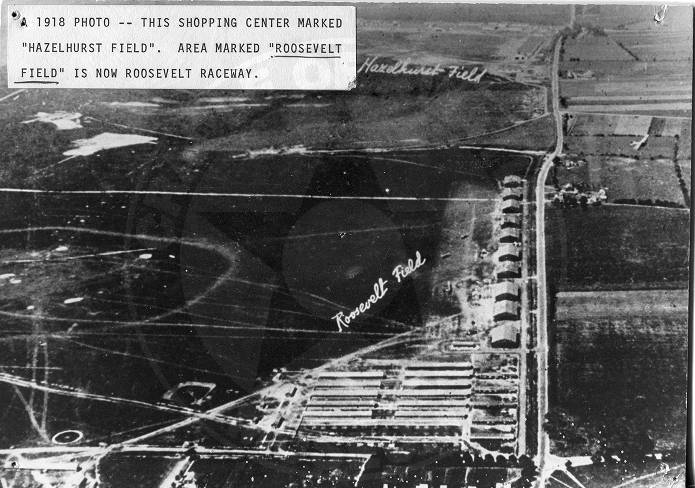
- Photograph of Roosevelt Field in 1918. Various buildings appear to be in an early stage in Construction.
- Active: 30 June 1918 – 30 December 1918 (6 Months)
- Disbanded: 30 December 1918
- Country: United States
- Branch: United States Army
- Type: Construction
- Role: Laborers
- Part of: United States Army Air Service

Commanders
- 1st. Lieutenant: William J. Lang
- 2nd. Lieutenant: Howard F. Meixner
- 2nd. Lieutenant: Ashton Parker

The 27th Construction Company was a United States Army unit that served during World War I. Construction companies were originally created to fulfill the labor requirements created in two agreements between the United States and the United Kingdom, the 5 December agreement and the Rothermere-Foulois agreement. Each company was organized into one of three roles: bricklaying, carpeting, and general laborers. By the end of the war, over 6,000 men had enlisted across 39 construction companies.

== Organization ==
The 27th construction company was organized as part of the second wave of companies that had been authorized in the spring. The unit was created as a general labor company, as the bricklaying and carpenter companies had already reached the amount required by both the 5 December and Rothermere-Foulois agreements. The company was formed at an Aviation field in Waco, Texas, where men, upon being assigned to the unit, would have their trades tested by a chief examiner. According to the company trade roster, the 27th was composed largely of mechanics, clerks, welders, and cooks. In addition, the company had various "chief of section" roles in which they were responsible for the men of a certain trade. Once the men passed their exams, they would become qualified to serve. Those that did not were transferred to different units.

The 27th was officially mustered into the Army Air Service on 30 June 1918, numbering 136 men in total, under the command of 2nd Lieutenant Howard F. Meixner. Judging from the men's emergency contacts, it would seem the most came from the south. Texas, Oklahoma, Tennessee, Louisiana, and Arkansas would make up the majority.

On 1 July Lieutenant William J. Lang was placed in command of the Company. In his pre-war life Lang had worked as an architectural and structural engineer. Following the U.S. entry into the war, Lang attended an officer training camp where, upon completion, he received his commission as a 1st Lieutenant. Lang later served at Kelly Field before, on account of his experience as an officer and engineer, he was appointed to command the 27th. Prior to his appointment he very briefly commanded the 17th Construction Company in June before being transferred to lead the 27th.

== Service history ==
Following their mustering the 27th would remain in Waco for a month before departing on 1 August to begin heading east towards a Supply Center in Morrison, Virginia. From there they were to head north to Mineola, New York. Along with the 27th, the 24th, 25th, and 26th Construction Companies would also be departing and the four companies, numbering around 570 men, would travel to Morrison together on board a train. The train, numbering eighteen cars, was commanded by lieutenant Lang.

=== Journey to New York ===
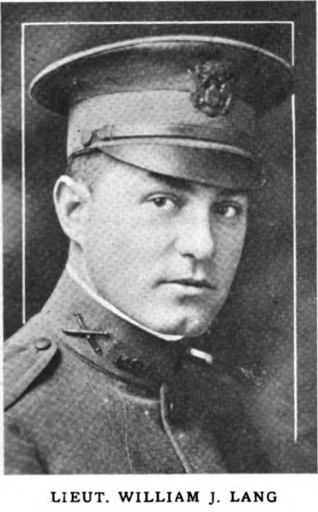
Lieutenant Lang would later go on to serve in the Army Air Force during World War II as a Major, eventually retiring with the rank of Lieutenant Colonel.

Throughout the four-day journey to Virginia, the company would participate in various parades across the south, including at Pine Bluff, Arkansas, Cornith, Mississippi, Chattanooga, Tennessee, and Asheville, North Carolina. At Pine Bluff, they performed a setting up exercise on the local school field and were afterward given food, drinks, and magazines. The army trains there encountered problems when local girls "permitted themselves to be pulled to the window of the train", resulting in one woman nearly being run over, according to the Pine Bluff Daily Graphic. The whole ordeal would leave one officer to state that he "would have to prohibit handshaking and would have to order the windows of the coaches closed" should this be repeated. On the following night, the four companies reached Chattanooga, where they used the bathhouse of the Y.M.C.A. and swam in a nearby pool. As this was happening, Sergeant Lawrence E. Conley directed the band of the 27th to play various songs such as the "Morning Serenade" and "Over There". The band's performance was widely praised by those in attendance and by midnight the companies, with the band at the head of the column, departed into Georgia. Unlike at Pine Bluff, there were no accounts of "Khaki-Crazed Girls" impeding the soldiers, likely to their disappointment.

After traveling a distance of over 700 miles (1,126.54 km), the Companies arrived at Morrison on 5 August where they proceeded to the General Aviation Supply Depot. After remaining in Morrison for ten days, the Company departed for Mineola on Long Island, New York, where they arrive in the 16th. Later the same month they were moved to Hazelhurst Field. Hazelhurst, located near Garden City, was quickly becoming one of the country's most popular and expansive aviation training fields. Construction companies like the 27th were needed to fuel that expansion. One such example was the creation of Roosevelt Field, an area of about 300 acres on the Hempstead Plains. This was established on the eastern half of Hazelhurst Field No. 1. Roosevelt Field was used for advanced flight training by various Aero Squadrons stationed in the vicinity and was under the command of the 1st Provisional Wing. The company would be assigned to Roosevelt in September and would remain there for the remainder of the war.

=== Roosevelt Field ===
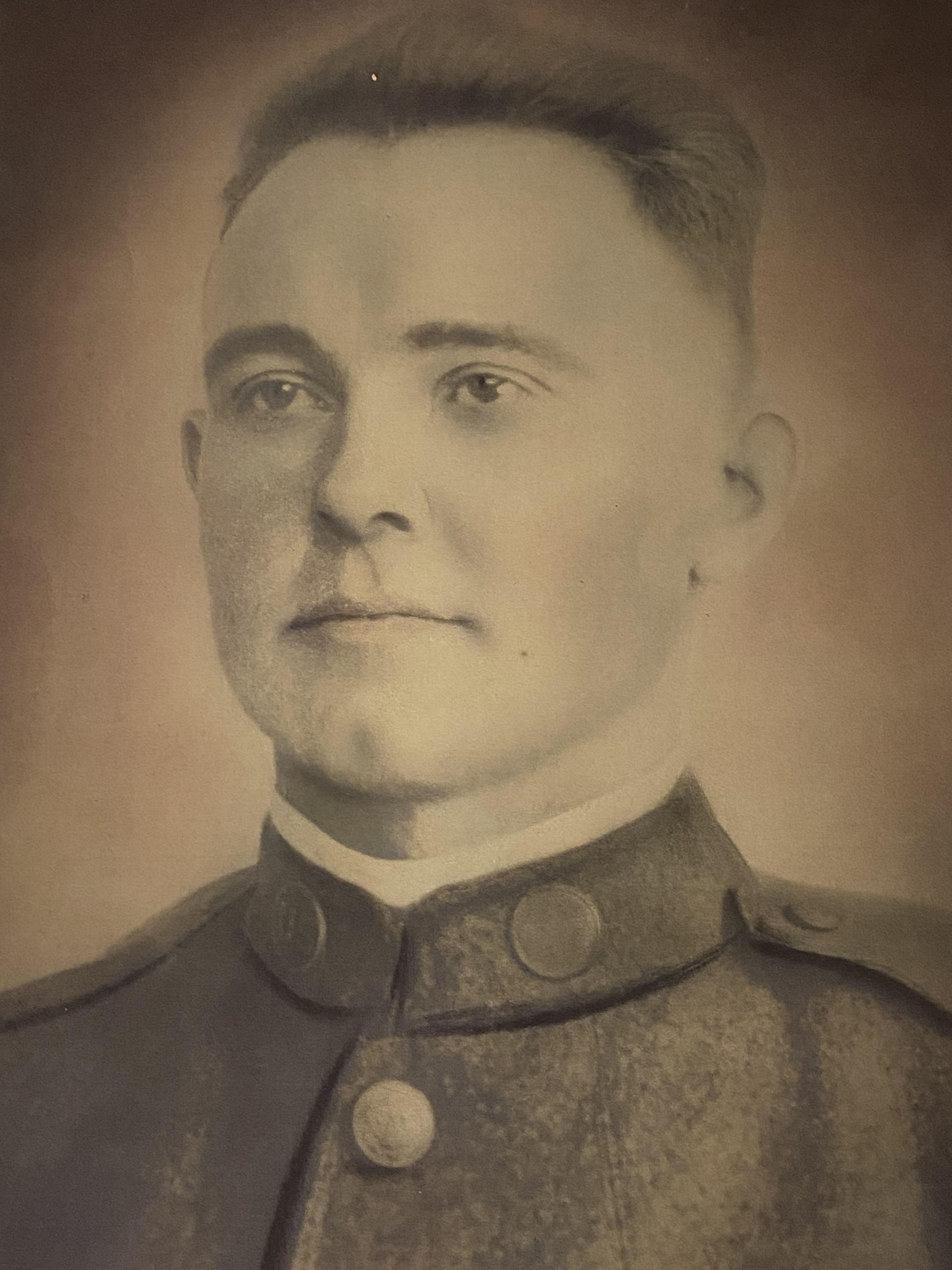
Photograph of Bruce E. Gray, a Sergeant in the 27th. He served in one of the companies "Chief of Section" roles.

Throughout the fall the 27th would construct barracks, bathhouses, and roads on Roosevelt Field. The building would be overseen by Section E of the Construction Division. According to a post-war report the construction of Roosevelt cost $66,286, making it the third most expensive flying field on Long Island during the war. All the construction work performed by the company would give them a great deal of experience before their eventual deployment to England. In early to mid-October over 30 men from the company, including Lieutenant Lang, fell ill, likely a result of the Spanish Flu. Corporal John T. Brady and Private Joseph E. Clark, on the 9th and 13th respectively, would both die from the illness. On the day following Pvt. Clark's death the company was placed into quarantine. This would prove successful as by the time it was lifted on the 28th the number of sick men had dropped by roughly two-thirds. In November the company had received its long-awaited orders to prepare for overseas shipment. A short time later, these orders, to the disappointment of many, were rescinded as the armistice was signed on the 11th. Despite the end of the war, construction on Roosevelt was not halted. The company even gained an additional 85 men on 23 November, the majority of which were transferred from Aero Squadrons stationed at Roosevelt. The total strength of the company would be brought to around 234 men. The 27th would continue to work until their demobilization in December.

While not engaged in Construction work the company would partake in various sporting and social events in and around Minola. Men from the 27th would partake in track events, bowling, and pool matches, winning many of them. In December the company band provided the music for a dance hosted by the 74th Aero Squadron. With dances reportedly being hosted every Monday evening, it's likely the band furnished the music for many of those as well. On 17 December Lieutenant Lang was discharged and 2nd Lieutenant Ashton Parker, who joined the company in November, took command. On the 20th the company was given a detailed explanation of the War Risk Insurance Act by Y.M.C.A. secretary Barnett and Lieutenant Parker. The following day each man was given a physical examination in preparation for their discharge. On 30 December the 27th, numbering 252 men, was officially demobilized at Garden City, New York.

== See also ==
- List of American construction companies in World War I
