= Camp Morrison =

Camp Morrison may refer to:

- Camp Morrison, Virginia, a World War I Army post at Morrison, Virginia
- Camp Morrison, Idaho, a Boy Scout camp in McCall, Idaho
