= Mason County, Virginia =

Mason County, Virginia has existed twice in the U.S. state of Virginia's history. Formed in 1788, and 1804, respectively, both counties were named for George Mason, a Virginia delegate to the 1787 Constitutional Convention, and each was separated from Virginia due to the creation of a new state, partitioned in accordance with Article IV, Section 3, Clause 1 of the United States Constitution. The two counties continued in existence as:

- Mason County, Kentucky, separated when Kentucky was admitted to the Union in 1792.
- Mason County, West Virginia, separated when West Virginia was admitted to the Union in 1863.

== See also ==
- Former counties, cities, and towns of Virginia
