= List of American construction companies in World War I =

WWI United States Army Air Service units

United States Construction Companies
- Flag of the United States during World War One
- Active: January 1918 - April 1919
- Country: United States
- Branch: United States Army
- Type: Construction
- Role: Bricklayers, Carpenters, Laborers
- Size: Company (160-250 enlisted men)
- Part of: Overseas Companies: American Expeditionary Force; Aviation Section, Signal Corps; Army Air Service; Service of Supply; Mainland Companies: Aviation Section, Signal Corps; Army Air Service; Construction Division; Section E

Construction Companies, sometimes referred to as Aero Construction Companies, were United States Army Air Service units that served during World War I. First authorized in December 1917, these companies were created, originally under the Aviation Section, Signal Corps, to serve as skilled laborers in the construction of various projects in the United Kingdom, the majority of which involved the building of facilities relating to aviation. Half of these units, however, would remain in the U.S., where they worked on various airfields. By the end of the war, over 6,000 men had enlisted across 39 construction companies.

== Organization and role ==
On December 5, 1917, The United States and the United Kingdom signed an agreement that, among other things, called for the U.S. to supply 6,200 American laborers to use as construction workers for various building projects relating to the Royal Flying Corps. Later that month, in response to the agreement, came the authorization of the first construction companies, all of which were to be organized at Kelly Field in Texas. The next month, on January 26, 1918, the U.S. and U.K. signed another agreement, known as the Rothermere-Foulois agreement or Handley-Page agreement, which called for the arrival of 3,000 American laborers to arrive by June, though these troops were to have a more specific purpose. Originally, however, the labor for the Handley-Page agreement was meant to be supplied by African-American units though difficulty with quickly finding sufficient numbers of trade specialist made this impossible. In response 9 white construction companies were furnished instead, these units originally organized for work under the December 5th agreement. The original 3,000 African-American laborers were still to be organized and were to be placed under the December 5 agreement. Many African-American tradesmen would be organized into various labor battalions serving in France.

Both of these agreements called for these laborers to be made up of bricklayers, carpenters, and general non-specific laborers. Of these general laborers were to make up the majority in both agreements, followed by bricklayers, then carpenters. Of the 39 construction companies, 12 were bricklayers, 4 were carpenters, and 23 were laborers.

From March to April 1918, the first 9 Construction Companies, all bricklaying, arrived in England to provide the labor for the December 5th agreement. Companies 10–19, excluding the 13th, went to work on the construction projects under the Handley-Page agreement. These 19 companies were assigned to the Service of Supply troops which was a part of the American Expeditionary Force. The remaining 20 companies spent the rest of the war in the U.S. under the construction division, though they were meant for overseas service the war ended before they could be shipped off. While in the states these companies mainly worked on the construction of Lee Hall, Langley Field, and various aviation fields on Long Island. Only one non-Overseas company was stationed outside New York and Virginia, that being the 24th which was stationed in Florida, though this occurred after the war.

== Trades and examinations ==
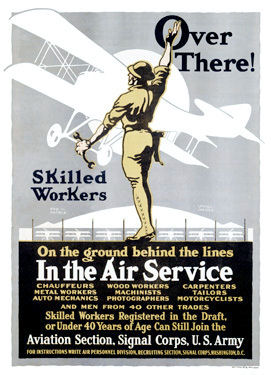
Recruitment Poster for the Aviation Section, Signal Corp, targeted towards skilled workers.

In order to be assigned to the construction companies, nearly all men had to be proficient in at least 1 of 57 different trades. Following their enlistment, the men would undergo a medical examination then proceed to list their profession to an officer who would then direct them to an oral examiner. These oral examinations would be given to the recruit by a fellow enlisted man with experience in their respective occupation. Some trades had practical examinations as well, which was overseen by a chief of section and various examiners. Once the men completed their required testing they would then be granted to join their company. Those who failed their exams, both oral and practical, would again be questioned and if a substitute trade could not be found they would then, generally, be assigned to other units. In addition to these examinations a company would also undergo the standard military training as they could be sent to the front once their construction duties were finished.

The 57 trades are as follows: (Note that some trades received the same examination as others)

Trade	Practical Examination (If Required)
Armorer	None
Auto Body Builder	None
Auto Mechanic	Required to explain the functions of the running gear and chassis.
Balloon Rigger	None
Blacksmith	Required to make a plain weld using a round or flat stock, form an eye on a round stock, construct a mud scraper, hook and staple along with other small other task.
Boat Builder	None
Bricklayer	None
Cabinet Maker	Required to pass the same exam as was given to the carpenters, with the addition of making repairs on furniture.
Canvas Worker	Required to sew using a sewing machine and sew by hand on different types of fabrics, as well as explaining their work.
Carpenter	Required to perform work such as, but not limited too, the construction of office railings, floor laying, signboards, woodwork repairing, saw horses, packing boxes.
Carpenter (Boss)	Required to understand blueprints, use a steel square in laying out rafters, use angles and joints, estimate the amount of lumber needed for construction plans, as well as demonstrate knowledge of carpenter tools.
Chauffeur	Required to drive and operate an automobile around the campgrounds while utilizing the gearshift, brakes and throttle controls.
Chauffeur (1st Class)	Likely Required to be able to perform all task required by a standard chauffeur.
Chief of Section	This position was held by enlisted men that were highly qualified in their respective trade. They would oversee the training of workers skilled in their area of expertise.
Clerk (No Typist)	None
Clerk (Typist)	Required to transcribe letters and other dictation.
Cook	None
Coppersmith	None
Cordage Worker	None
Draftsman	None
Electrician	None
Engine Apprentice	Required to partially dismantle a motor, demonstrate mechanical knowledge by explaining various functions of a motor.
Engine Repairman	Required to partially dismantle a motor, demonstrate mechanical knowledge by explaining various functions of a motor.
Engine Tester	Required to partially dismantle a motor, demonstrate mechanical knowledge by explaining various functions of a motor.
Fabric Worker	Required to sew using a sewing machine and sew by hand on different types of fabrics, as well as explaining their work.
Instrument Repairer	None
Lithographer	None
Machinist	None
Magneto Repairman	Required to demonstrate knowledge regarding electrical knowledge.
Mechanic (Chief)	None
Mechanic (Assistant Chief)	None
Mechanic (General)	None
Mechanic (Skilled)	None
Mechanician (Airplane)	Due to the rarity of men having this trade, they were required to read blueprints, make loops in wire and solder, repair ribs, longerons, and patch fabrics.
Mechanician (Motor)	None
Metal Worker	Required to hinge two pieces of sheet metal together, the joining copper tubes together, as well as funnel, can cover, and stove pipe work.
Motocyclist	Required to drive and operate a motorcycle around the campgrounds and explain the vehicles various parts and their role.
Moulder	None
Non-Specialist	None
Packer	None
Painter	Required to Mix various colors, work on signboards, as well as perform work on wood such as varnishing, finishing and staining.
Pattern Maker	Required to pass the same exam as was given to the carpenters, with the addition of making repairs on furniture.
Photographer	None
Plumber	None
Propeller Maker	There was no specific exam for propeller makers, and as such, they were given the same exam as Cabinet Makers and Pattern Makers with the exception that the examiner was a propeller maker himself.
Propeller Tester	None
Radio Mechanic	Required to send and receive messages and demonstrate knowledge in the method of communication.
Rigger	None
Saddler	None
Sail Maker	Required to sew using a sewing machine and sew by hand on different types of fabrics, as well as explaining their work.
Stenographer	Required to transcribe dictation.
Stock-Keeper	None
Tool Maker	None
Truckmaster	Required to explain the functions of the running gear and chassis.
Truckmaster (Assistant)	Required to explain the functions of the running gear and chassis.
Vulcanizer	None
Welder (Acetylene)	Required to weld cast iron, brass, aluminum, or steel depending on their familiarity with these metals and demonstrate knowledge regarding welding.

== List of companies ==
The first 12 Construction Companies were mustered into service in January of 1918 and by August all were overseas in England, with the first units arriving in March. In the spring another 27 companies were authorized for creation.

=== First wave ===
Unit Name	Active	Stationed	Type
1st Construction Company	January 1918 - April 1919	Organized - Kelly Field, Texas: Kelly Field, Texas; January - January 1918; Camp Sevier, South Carolina; January - March 1918; Garden City, New York; March - March 1918; Port of Embarkation, Hoboken; March - March 1918; England; March 1918 - March 1919; Garden City, New York; March - April 1919; Demobilized - Garden City, New York	Bricklaying
2nd Construction Company	January 1918 - April 1919	Organized - Kelly Field, Texas: Kelly Field, Texas; January - January 1918; Camp Sevier, South Carolina; January - March 1918; Aviation Field No. 1, New York; March - March 1918; Port of Embarkation, Hoboken; March - March 1918; England; March 1918 - March 1919; Garden City, New York; March - April 1919; Demobilized - Garden City, New York	Bricklaying
3rd Construction Company	January 1918 - December 1918	Organized - Kelly Field, Texas: Kelly Field, Texas; January - January 1918; Camp Sevier, South Carolina; January - March 1918; Garden City, New York; March - March 1918; Port of Embarkation, Hoboken; March - March 1918; England; March 1918 - December 1918; Garden City, New York; December 1918; Demobilized - Garden City, New York	Bricklaying
4th Construction Company	January 1918 - December 1918	Organized - Kelly Field, Texas: Kelly Field, Texas; January - January 1918; Camp Sevier, South Carolina; January - March 1918; Garden City, New York; March - March 1918; Port of Embarkation, Hoboken; March - March 1918; England; March 1918 - December 1918; Garden City, New York; December 1918; Demobilized - Garden City, New York	Bricklaying
5th Construction Company	January 1918 - December 1918	Organized - Kelly Field, Texas: Kelly Field, Texas; January - January 1918; Camp Sevier, South Carolina; January - March 1918; Hazelhurst Field, New York; March - March 1918; Port of Embarkation, Hoboken; March - March 1918; England; March 1918 - December 1918; Garden City, New York; December 1918; Demobilized - Garden City, New York	Bricklaying
6th Construction Company	January 1918 - December 1918	Organized - Kelly Field, Texas: Kelly Field, Texas; January - January 1918; Camp Sevier, South Carolina; January - March 1918; Mineola, New York; March - March 1918; Port of Embarkation, Hoboken; March - March 1918; England; March 1918 - December 1918; Garden City, New York; December 1918; Demobilized - Garden City, New York	Bricklaying
7th Construction Company	January 1918 - December 1918	Organized - Kelly Field, Texas: Kelly Field, Texas; January - February 1918; Camp Sevier, South Carolina; February - March 1918; Garden City, New York; March - March 1918; Port of Embarkation, Hoboken; March - March 1918; England; March 1918 - December 1918; Garden City, New York; December 1918; Demobilized - Garden City, New York	Bricklaying
8th Construction Company	January 1918 - December 1918	Organized - Kelly Field, Texas: Kelly Field, Texas; January - January 1918; Camp Sevier, South Carolina; January - March 1918; Mineola, New York; March - March 1918; Port of Embarkation, Hoboken; March - March 1918; England; March 1918 - December 1918; Garden City, New York; December 1918; Demobilized - Garden City, New York	Bricklaying
9th Construction Company	January 1918 - December 1918	Organized - Kelly Field, Texas: Kelly Field, Texas; January - February 1918; Camp Sevier, South Carolina; February - March 1918; Garden City, New York; March - April 1918; Port of Embarkation, Hoboken; April - April 1918; England; April 1918 - December 1918; Garden City, New York; December 1918; Demobilized - Garden City, New York	Bricklaying
10th Construction Company	January 1918 - December 1918	Organized - Kelly Field, Texas: Kelly Field, Texas; January - February 1918; Camp Sevier, South Carolina; February - May 1918; Garden City, New York; May - August 1918; Port of Embarkation, Hoboken; August - August 1918; England; August 1918 - December 1918; Garden City, New York; December 1918; Demobilized - Garden City, New York	Bricklaying
11th Construction Company	January 1918 - April 1919	Organized - Kelly Field, Texas: Kelly Field, Texas; January - February 1918; Camp Sevier, South Carolina; February - May 1918; Garden City, New York; May - August 1918; Port of Embarkation, Hoboken; August - August 1918; England; August 1918 - March 1919; Garden City, New York; March - April 1919; Demobilized - Garden City, New York	Bricklaying
12th Construction Company	January 1918 - April 1919	Organized - Kelly Field, Texas: Kelly Field, Texas; January - February 1918; Camp Sevier, South Carolina; February - June 1918; Garden City, New York; June - August 1918; Port of Embarkation, Hoboken; August - August 1918; England; August 1918 - April 1919; Garden City, New York; April 1919; Demobilized - Garden City, New York	Bricklaying

=== Second wave ===
Unit Name	Active	Stationed	Type
13th Construction Company	May 1918 - December 1918	Organized - Garden City, New York: Garden City, New York; May - June 1918; Port of Embarkation, Hoboken; June - June 1918; England; June - December 1918; Garden City, New York; December 1918; Demobilized - Garden City, New York	Carpenter
14th Construction Company	May 1918 - December 1918	Organized - Camp Sevier, South Carolina: Camp Sevier, South Carolina; May - June 1918; Garden City, New York; June - August 1918; Port of Embarkation, Hoboken; August 1918; England; August - December 1918; Garden City, New York; December 1918; Demobilized - Garden City, New York	Carpenter
15th Construction Company	May 1918 - December 1918	Organized - Camp Sevier, South Carolina: Camp Sevier, South Carolina; May - June 1918; Garden City, New York; June - July 1918; Hazelhurst Field, New York; July - August 1918; Port of Embarkation, Hoboken; August 1918; England; August - December 1918; Garden City, New York; December 1918; Demobilized - Garden City, New York	Carpenter
16th Construction Company	May 1918 - April 1919	Organized - Camp Sevier, South Carolina: Camp Sevier, South Carolina; May - June 1918; Garden City, New York; June - July 1918; Chapman Field, New York; July - August 1918; Port of Embarkation, Hoboken; August 1918; England; August - April 1919; Mitchel Field, New York; April 1919; Demobilized - Mitchel Field, New York	Carpenter
17th Construction Company	May 1918 - January 1919	Organized - Waco, Texas: Waco, Texas; May - June 1918; Garden City, New York; June - August 1918; Port of Embarkation, Hoboken; August 1918; England; August - November 1918; Garden City, New York; November 1918 - January 1919; Demobilized - Garden City, New York	Labor
18th Construction Company	May 1918 - December 1918	Organized - Waco, Texas: Waco, Texas; May - June 1918; Garden City, New York; June - August 1918; Port of Embarkation, Hoboken; August 1918; England; August - December 1918; Garden City, New York; December 1918; Demobilized - Garden City, New York	Labor
19h Construction Company	May 1918 - December 1918	Organized - Waco, Texas: Waco, Texas; May - June 1918; Garden City, New York; June - August 1918; Port of Embarkation, Hoboken; August 1918; England; August - December 1918; Garden City, New York; December 1918; Demobilized - Garden City, New York	Labor
20th Construction Company	May 1918 - January 1919	Organized - Waco, Texas: Waco, Texas; May - July 1918; Lee Hall, Virginia; July - November 1918; Langley Field, Virginia; November 1918 - January 1919; Demobilized - Langley Field, Virginia	Labor
21st Construction Company	June 1918 - January 1919	Organized - Waco, Texas: Waco, Texas; June - August 1918; Lee Hall, Virginia; August - November 1918; Langley Field, Virginia; November 1918 - January 1919; Demobilized - Langley Field, Virginia	Labor
22nd Construction Company	June 1918 - April 1919	Organized - Waco, Texas: Waco, Texas; June - August 1918; Lee Hall, Virginia; August 1918 - April 1919; Demobilized - Lee Hall, Virginia	Labor
23rd Construction Company	June 1918 - April 1919	Organized - Waco, Texas: Waco, Texas; June - July 1918; Lee Hall, Virginia; July 1918 - April 1919; Demobilized - Lee Hall, Virginia	Labor
24th Construction Company	June 1918 - March 1919	Organized - Waco, Texas: Waco, Texas; June - August 1918; Lufberry Field, New York; August - November 1918; Brindley Field, New York; November - December 1918; Chapman Field, Florida; December 1918 - March 1919; Demobilized - Chapman Field, Florida	Labor
25th Construction Company	June 1918 - January 1919	Organized - Waco, Texas: Waco, Texas; June - August 1918; Henry J. Damm Field, New York; August - December 1918; Aviation General Supply Depot, Middletown, Pennsylvania; December - January 1919; Demobilized - Aviation General Supply Depot, Middletown, Pennsylvania	Labor
26th Construction Company	June 1918 - February 1919	Organized - Waco, Texas: Waco, Texas; June - August 1918; Garden City, New York; August - October 1918; Hazelhurst Field, New York; October 1918 - January 1919; Garden City, New York; January - February 1919; Demobilized - Garden City, New York	Labor
27th Construction Company	June 1918 - December 1918	Organized - Waco, Texas: Waco, Texas; June - August 1918; Supply Center, Morrison Virginia; August - August 1918; Hazelhurst Field, New York; August - September 1918; Roosevelt Field, New York; September - December 1918; Demobilized - Garden City, New York	Labor
28th Construction Company	April 1918 - December 1918	Organized - Fort Wayne, Michigan: Fort Wayne, Michigan; April - August 1918; Langley Field, Virginia; August - December 1918; Demobilized - Langley Field, Virginia	Labor
29th Construction Company	April 1918 - December 1918	Organized - Fort Wayne, Michigan: Fort Wayne, Michigan; April - August 1918; Langley Field, Virginia; August - December 1918; Demobilized - Langley Field, Virginia	Labor
30th Construction Company	April 1918 - December 1918	Organized - Fort Wayne, Michigan: Fort Wayne, Michigan; April - August 1918; Langley Field, Virginia; August - December 1918; Demobilized - Langley Field, Virginia	Labor
31st Construction Company	June 1918 - December 1918	Organized - Fort Wayne, Michigan: Fort Wayne, Michigan; June - August 1918; Langley Field, Virginia; August - December 1918; Demobilized - Langley Field, Virginia	Labor
32nd Construction Company	June 1918 - December 1918	Organized - Fort Wayne, Michigan: Fort Wayne, Michigan; June - August 1918; Langley Field, Virginia; August - December 1918; Demobilized - Langley Field, Virginia	Labor
33rd Construction Company	June 1918 - December 1918	Organized - Fort Wayne, Michigan: Fort Wayne, Michigan; June - August 1918; Langley Field, Virginia; August - December 1918; Demobilized - Langley Field, Virginia	Labor
34th Construction Company	April 1918 - December 1918	Organized - Fort Wayne, Michigan: Fort Wayne, Michigan; April - July 1918; Langley Field, Virginia; July - December 1918; Demobilized - Langley Field, Virginia	Labor
35th Construction Company	April 1918 - December 1918	Organized - Fort Wayne, Michigan: Fort Wayne, Michigan; April - July 1918; Langley Field, Virginia; July - December 1918; Demobilized - Langley Field, Virginia	Labor
36th Construction Company	April 1918 - December 1918	Organized - Fort Wayne, Michigan: Fort Wayne, Michigan; April - July 1918; Langley Field, Virginia; July - December 1918; Demobilized - Langley Field, Virginia	Labor
37th Construction Company	June 1918 - December 1918	Organized - Fort Wayne, Michigan: Fort Wayne, Michigan; June - August 1918; Langley Field, Virginia; August - December 1918; Demobilized - Langley Field, Virginia	Labor
38th Construction Company	June 1918 - December 1918	Organized - Fort Wayne, Michigan: Fort Wayne, Michigan; June - August 1918; Langley Field, Virginia; August - December 1918; Demobilized - Langley Field, Virginia	Labor
39th Construction Company	June 1918 - December 1918	Organized - Fort Wayne, Michigan: Fort Wayne, Michigan; June - August 1918; Langley Field, Virginia; August - December 1918; Demobilized - Langley Field, Virginia	Labor

== Construction Projects ==
Information regarding specific work done by the companies is not widely known, and only Companies 1, 2, 11, 12, and 16 have their construction history fully documented. As such the following list will assume that, based on the Order of Battle of the United States land forces in the World War volume 3 part 3, these companies participated in the construction of the various fields, bases, etc. in which they were stationed.

=== Work in England ===
Unit Name	Construction Projects
1st Construction Company	Chattis Hill Aerodrome
2nd Construction Company	Lopcombe Corner Aerodrome Knotty Ash Camp (American Rest Camp)
3rd Construction Company	Emseworth Aerodrome
4th Construction Company	Easton Aerodrome Rustington Aerodrome (Detachment)
5th Construction Company	Emseworth Aerodrome
6th Construction Company	Emseworth Aerodrome
7th Construction Company	Marske Aerodrome
8th Construction Company	Rustington Aerodrome
9th Construction Company	Northolt Aerodrome (Detachment) Harling Road Aerodrome (Detachment)
10th Construction Company	Ford Junction Aerodrome (Detachment) Tangmere Aerodrome (Detachment)
11th Construction Company	American Rest Camp, Winchester
12th Construction Company	American Rest Camp, Winchester
13th Construction Company	Harling Road Aerodrome (Detachment) Marske Aerodrome (Detachment)
14th Construction Company	Ford Junction Aerodrome
15th Construction Company	Rustington Aerodrome
16th Construction Company	Emseworth Aerodrome (Detachment) Tangmere Aerodrome (Detachment)
17th Construction Company	Ford Junction Aerodrome (Detachment) Tangmere Aerodrome (Detachment)
18th Construction Company	Emseworth Aerodrome
19th Construction Company	Rustington Aerodrome

=== Work in the United States ===
Unit Name	Construction Projects
20th Construction Company	Lee Hall, Virginia Langley Field, Virginia
21st Construction Company	Lee Hall, Virginia Langley Field, Virginia
22nd Construction Company	Lee Hall, Virginia
23rd Construction Company	Lee Hall, Virginia
24th Construction Company	Lufberry Field, New York Brindley Field, New York Chapman Field, Florida
25th Construction Company	Henry J. Damm Field, New York
26th Construction Company	Garden City, New York Hazelhuust Field, New York
27th Construction Company	Roosevelt Field, New York
28th Construction Company	Langley Field, Virginia
29th Construction Company	Langley Field, Virginia
30th Construction Company	Langley Field, Virginia
31st Construction Company	Langley Field, Virginia
32nd Construction Company	Langley Field, Virginia
33rd Construction Company	Langley Field, Virginia
34th Construction Company	Langley Field, Virginia
35th Construction Company	Langley Field, Virginia
36th Construction Company	Langley Field, Virginia
37th Construction Company	Langley Field, Virginia
38th Construction Company	Langley Field, Virginia
39th Construction Company	Langley Field, Virginia
