= 1st Construction Company (U.S. Army Air Service) =

- Insignia of S.O.S. troops during WW1
- Active: 5 January 1918 – 5 April 1919
- Disbanded: 5 April 1919
- Country: United States
- Branch: United States Army
- Type: Construction
- Role: Bricklaying
- Size: Company (250 Enlisted Men)
- Part of: United States Army Air Service

Commanders
- Captain: Frederick C. Blodgett
- 1st. Lieutenant: John L. Sheed

The 1st Construction Company, sometimes referred to as the 1st Construction Bricklaying Co., was a United States Army unit that served during World War I. Construction companies were originally created to fulfill the labor requirements created two agreements between the United States and United Kingdom, the 5 December agreement and the Rothermere-Foulois agreement. Each company was organized into one of three roles, bricklaying, carpeting, and general laborers. By the end of the war, over 6,000 men had enlisted across 39 construction companies.

== Organization ==
The 1st Construction Company was authorized in late December 1917 as a bricklaying unit at Kelly Field in San Antonio, Texas. Men began being assigned to the company on 22 December 1917, and by the 27th 160 men had enlisted. While the vast majority were bricklayers, the company was also composed of other construction trades, such as carpenters and mechanics. Following their assignment, the men had their respective trades tested by examiners at Kelly Field and on 5 January 1918, the company was mustered into service under the command of Captain Frederick C. Blodgett. 1st Lieutenant John L. Sheed, who had briefly commanded the company prior to Blodgett's appointment, was placed second in command.

== Service history ==
The 1st remained in Kelly Field for only a short period of time after their organization, departing on 10 January to Camp Sevier in South Carolina. They arrived on the 13th and began the military training and procurement of equipment needed for service in England. While stationed at Camp Sevier the unit was attached to the 30th infantry division, as they also were preparing for going overseas. On 5 March the company left for a camp in Mineola, New York, arriving at midnight the following day. On the 16th of the same month, they boarded the RMS Baltic and began their voyage overseas, along with a convoy of other ships. The company arrived in England as part of the Service of Supply, or S.O.S., troops that were attached to the American Expeditionary Force. In England they were under the authority of Base Section Number 3.

On 28 March the company landed in Liverpool, England, and on the 29th the company was ordered to Romsey, England. Also in March came the authorization of increasing the personal of construction companies from 160 to 250. The 1st only stayed at Romsey for a few days before leaving on 3 April for Chattis Hill in Stockbridge. On 13 July came the arrival of the additional 90 men mentioned earlier, under the command of 2nd Lieutenant John Thomas. The company built many of the buildings at Cattis Hill, including an Aerodrome, Chapels, Military houses, and numerous other construction projects. The 1st was one of five construction units that worked on Chattis Hill, the others being the 471st, 472nd and 478th Construction squadrons, as well as a detachment of men with the 13th construction company. All work at Chattis Hill was completed by 30 October, at which point the company was ordered to U.S. Base Hospital No. 204, then to Southampton, then to Failsworth in Manchester. Failsworth was the site of an Aerodrome and 3 construction companies, including the 1st, arrived to construct it. The armistice, signed on 11 November, stopped these plans as the company began the process of returning equipment to America.

On 28 November the company moved to Knotty Ash in Liverpool but later received orders to begin the process of returning to America. These orders were canceled shortly after however, on 3 January 1919, and the company returned to Knotty Ash to resume their previous construction work. They would remain in England until march of 1919, when they were ordered to return to the U.S. According to an Army Air Service report of 5 March 1919, the company had over $1,000 (nearly $18,800 today) worth of equipment when they were ordered to return to America. The 1st arrived back to the U.S. by the end of March and were stationed at Garden City in New York. By 3 April, all enlisted men had either been transferred or discharged, with the final company roaster being dated on 5 April 1919.

== See also ==
- List of American construction companies in World War I
