= Cobham, Virginia =

Cobham, Virginia may refer to:

- Cobham, Albemarle County, Virginia
- Cobham, Surry County, Virginia
