= List of former counties, cities, and towns of Virginia =

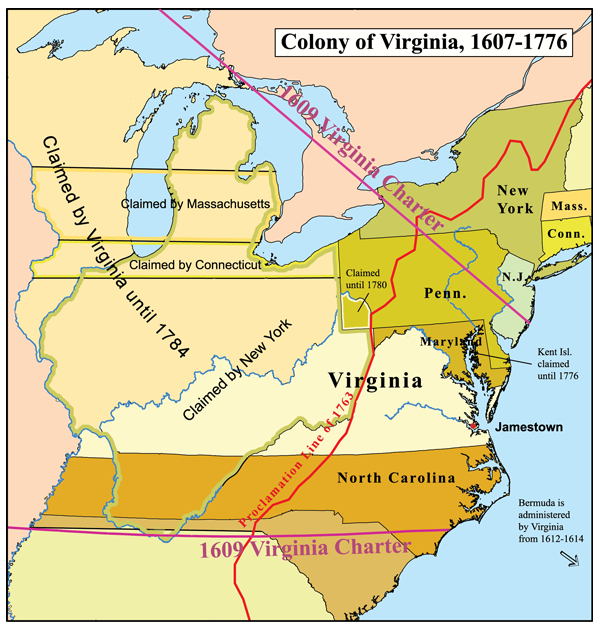
A map of the former Colony of Virginia, showing former territory and territorial claims

Former counties, cities, and towns of Virginia are those that existed within the English Colony of Virginia or, after statehood, the Commonwealth of Virginia, and no longer retain the same form within its boundaries. The settlements, towns, and administrative units discussed here ceased to exist in a number of ways. A number of smaller settlements became extinct due to loss of population. In time, others changed names, ascended to higher levels (or occasionally, descended to lower levels) of autonomy, or were occasionally annexed by larger nearby units. At a higher level, large areas of Virginia were split off to form new states, transferred as state boundaries were clarified, or came under the administration of the federal government.

Virginia has 95 counties, 38 independent cities, and 190 incorporated towns. There are also hundreds of unincorporated places in Virginia with their own identities.

== History ==
=== English settlement ===
After the European discovery of North America in the 15th century, European nations competed to establish colonies on the continent. In the late 16th century, the area claimed by England was well defined along the coast, but was very roughly marked in the west, extending from 34 to 48 degrees north latitude, or from the vicinity of Cape Fear in present-day North Carolina well into Acadia. The English called this huge claim, parts of which other powers contested, "Virginia." In 1609, the northern border was reduced to 45 degrees north latitude on the Atlantic coast, very close to the current coastal border between the U.S. and Canada. In 1584, Sir Walter Raleigh sent Philip Amadas and Arthur Barlowe to explore the coast of present-day North Carolina, and they returned with word of a regional native chief named "Wingina." This name was given to the territory, and was shortly renamed "Virginia" by Queen Elizabeth I, perhaps in part due to her status as the "Virgin Queen." Raleigh's Roanoke Colony in the 1580s and the Virginia Company of Plymouth's Popham Colony in the 1600s (present-day Maine) both took place in what the English then called Virginia, and were both unsuccessful in establishing permanent footholds.

==== Jamestown ====
Jamestown was the first permanent English settlement in North America, and included what was thereafter "Virginia." (The Pilgrims and the Plymouth Company's successor finally established a permanent colony at Plymouth, Massachusetts in 1620, but by then the area was no longer part of Virginia. The region was christened "New England" by Captain John Smith, who had played a crucial role in Jamestown's earliest years).

On May 14, 1607, the Virginia Company of London (competing with the Virginia Company of Plymouth) was the first to achieve a permanent settlement with the establishment of Jamestown Island. While favorable for defending from attacks by enemy ships, the location was poorly sited for supporting a substantial population, with brackish water, little hunting game, and high risk of attacks by hostile Native American tribes. Jamestown's survival was uncertain for the first five years. During that time, it was dependent upon supply missions from England, and a majority of early colonists died.

The colony reached a low point during the "starving time" in 1609-1610 when over 80% of the 500 colonists perished after the third supply mission was disrupted by a massive hurricane in the North Atlantic. However, with the arrival of new supplies, leadership in the person of Lord Delaware, and John Rolfe's successful cultivation of tobacco for export as a cash crop.

Though Jamestown became a permanent settlement, it was largely abandoned as a population center a century later, when the capital was moved to higher ground at Middle Plantation, soon renamed Williamsburg. Jamestown reverted to farmland until historic interest prompted preservation beginning in the late 19th century.

==== Other settlements ====
Kecoughtan, a better-sited location in the present-day independent city of Hampton, was essentially stolen from Native Americans in 1610 by the English colonists, under the leadership of Sir Thomas Gates. In the 21st century, through the old American Indian village of Kecoughtan, the City of Hampton lays claim to status as the oldest continually occupied settlement in the British Colonies in what is now the United States.

For almost 400 years, hundreds of counties, cities, and towns were formed in the Colony of Virginia and later the Commonwealth of Virginia. It was generally the tradition of the English during the colonial period to establish large geographic units, and then to sub-divide them into smaller more manageable units. This two-phase process was conducted in order to establish legal claims to maximum territory. As areas were settled, the large territories were subdivided for a variety of reasons.

=== Extension to Bermuda ===
In 1609, the proprietary Virginia Company of London's Third Supply Mission to its Virginia Colony consisted of a fleet of nine ships, headed by the company's newly built flagship, the Sea Venture. Aboard the flagship, commanded by Vice Admiral Christopher Newport, was the Admiral of the fleet, Sir George Somers, as well as Sir Thomas Gates.

In the Atlantic Ocean, the fleet encountered a massive three-day storm, most likely now thought to have been a hurricane. Sighting land, Admiral Somers had the Sea Venture steered aground there to save it from sinking. All aboard survived but their ship was damaged beyond repair, and they had become separated from the others. They soon realized that they had become shipwrecked on the north-easternmost island of an uninhabited archipelago, known as Bermuda.

They were stranded on the islands for 10 months. Two new ships were built to replace the Sea Venture with many parts used in their construction salvaged from the wrecked ship, which had been left "high and dry" on the reef when the storm abated. By 1610 the Deliverance and the Patience had been completed. Leaving two men behind to maintain England's claim on the islands, Somers set sail with the remainder from Bermuda for Jamestown. Those embarked included William Strachey, whose account of the adventures of the Sea Venture's survivors may have inspired Shakespeare's The Tempest, and who would draft Virginia's first laws, and John Rolfe, who would found Virginia's tobacco industry, making the colony economically viable. John Rolfe left his first wife and son buried in Bermuda, but the widower was to find a second wife in the Native American daughter of Chief Powhatan. He and Pocahontas became the parents of Thomas Rolfe, through whose descendants many First Families of Virginia trace their lineage to both English and Native American roots.

On arrival in Virginia on May 23, 1610, Somers found the colony, headquartered at Jamestown, decimated by what came to be called the Starving Time. Starvation, illness and attacks by Native Americans had left fewer than 100 survivors of the 500 settlers of the previous autumn. It was decided to abandon the settlement, and the survivors were boarded onto the Deliverance and Patience. The timely arrival of another relief fleet (bearing Governor Lord De La Warre) granted the colony a reprieve. Somers returned to Bermuda aboard the Patience, but died there in 1610.

After reaching England, the reports of survivors of the Sea Venture aroused great interest about Bermuda. Two years later, in 1612, the Virginia Company's Royal Charter was extended to include the island, and a party of 60 settlers was sent, under the command of Sir Richard Moore, the island's first governor, to join the three men left by the Deliverance and Patience. They founded and commenced construction of the town of St. George.

The Virginia Company, finding the colony at Bermuda unprofitable, briefly handed its administration to the Crown in 1614. The following year, 1615, King James granted a charter to a new company, the Somers Isles Company, formed by the same shareholders, which ran the colony until it was dissolved in 1684 (The Virginia Company itself was dissolved after its charter was revoked in 1624). Representative government was introduced to Bermuda in 1620, when its House of Assembly held its first session, and it became a self-governing colony. So at the very least, from 1612 until 1614, Bermuda, also known as "Virgineola" and the "Somers Isles," was legally part of the Virginia Colony. Close connections continued for the following century and a half, with many Bermudians settling in Virginia, and wealthy Bermudian merchant families, such as the Tuckers dominating trade through Virginia (and other Southern) ports.

=== Incorporation ===
==== Cities ====
In 1619, The Virginia Company of London divided up the settled portions of Virginia in North America into four large "burroughs," "citties" [sic], or "incorporations." Kecoughtan (soon renamed Elizabeth Cittie) included the eastern portion of the Virginia Peninsula, as well as the entire area known in modern times as the Eastern Shore as well as most of today's South Hampton Roads. Each of the others extended to both sides of the James River and even further.

These four cities were:

- Kecoughtan (later renamed Elizabeth City)
- James City
- Charles City
- Henrico City

It is unclear whether this form of political organization survived the loss of the Virginia Company's charter in 1624, when Virginia became a Royal Colony. Representation in the House of Burgesses had been expanded as plantations grew, and was more representative of population than the boundaries of the "cities", both before and after 1624.

==== Shires ====
In 1634, the local governmental unit of a "county" came to Virginia following the form of shires (or counties) in England. The concept as it was brought to North America, was to have an area of size such that legal matters such as recording land and property transfers, resolutions of disputes, and criminal matters could be handled at a "court" within a day's journey of travel from all of its parts. As the population of counties grew, especially into more distant geographic extremities, many counties subdivided to form additional counties. Having counties composed of areas of common interests to the citizens became a more important factor as the distance one could travel in a single day increased. Throughout the United States, counties are generally the setting for local courts, and local courts are still the designated places for recording land transactions and resolving civil disputes and criminal matters.

Each of the eight original shires of Virginia created in 1634 were renamed as counties only a few years later.

Note that including the earlier names of the four "citties" [sic] (created in 1619) and then changing "shire" to "county" in their names has long caused confusion. These actions led to seemingly contradictory names such as "James City County" and "Charles City County." In Virginia, with the unusual status of independent cities to further confuse some, a locality can be one or the other, but not both.

- The oldest county, James City, which includes the location of the original 1607 settlement at Jamestown, apparently attempted to address the potential for confusion long ago, as the legal name is the "County of James City."
- In 1952, the citizens of the now-extinct Elizabeth City County voted to consolidate with the independent city of Hampton. They also voted to assume the better-known and less cumbersome name of Hampton.

Of these, as of 2007, five of the eight original shires are considered still extant in the Commonwealth of Virginia in essentially their same political form (county), though some boundaries and several names have changed in almost 400 years.

==== Independent cities ====
In Virginia, beginning in 1871, under state constitutional changes after the American Civil War (1861–1865), cities became politically independent of the counties. An independent city in Virginia since then has been comparable to a county. Many agencies of the U.S. Government consider Virginia's independent cities county-equivalents.

==== Incorporated towns ====
In Virginia, incorporated towns are located within counties. The level of services and relationships with the county may vary to suit local preferences. Towns can initiate annexation suits against contiguous counties to expand their territory but cannot do so against other incorporated towns or independent cities. Some incorporated towns have become independent cities. There are prohibitions against forming new incorporated towns in some counties.

==== Unincorporated towns and communities ====
In Virginia, unincorporated towns are essentially unincorporated communities without a formal political structure. They may also be called villages. Virginia does not officially recognize villages or unincorporated towns or communities as units of political subdivision of the state, unlike counties, independent cities, and incorporated towns. Township is also an unused term in Virginia.

In some independent cities of Virginia, areas that had been unincorporated towns are often called neighborhoods or communities of the same or similar names, to maintain their individual areas and identities.

== Areas no longer in Virginia ==
Four other states (Illinois, Indiana, Kentucky, and West Virginia) include significant territories once part of Colonial Virginia, and other neighbors possess smaller such areas. Generally, the earliest border descriptions of Virginia were more specific regarding eastern edges and waterways, than about western extremities, enabling Virginia's initial expansion.

=== Maryland ===
In 1631, William Claiborne of Jamestown established a trading post and settlement on the Isle of Kent (today known as Kent Island) in the Chesapeake Bay three years prior to the founding of the province of Maryland. Following the colony's formation, ownership of the island was disputed between the two colonies, until Claiborne left Kent Island permanently in 1658. Virginia did not give up its claims however, until 1776. Today, Kent Island is part of Queen Anne's County, Maryland.

=== Pennsylvania ===
There were many disputes over boundaries in western Virginia and Pennsylvania prior to 1780. Similar conflicts between Maryland and Pennsylvania were resolved by 1767 through the work of two men chosen by the sixth Lord Baltimore (for Maryland) and Thomas Penn and his brother Richard Penn Sr., sons of William Penn, and proprietors of Pennsylvania. Astronomer Charles Mason and surveyor Jeremiah Dixon came from England to do this work. The line they surveyed in 1766 and 1767 has since been known as the Mason–Dixon line. However, their authority extended west only as far as Western Maryland, and did not resolve border conflicts in the area known as Yohogania County. Virginia and Pennsylvania disputes there and elsewhere along the Virginia-Pennsylvania border areas continued throughout the remainder of the colonial period.

After the areas in dispute became part of the newly formed United States, the new states of Virginia and Pennsylvania (each one of the first thirteen states that formed the union) soon reached an agreement, and most of Yohogania County became part of Pennsylvania in the 1780s under terms agreed of the state legislatures of both Virginia and Pennsylvania. A small remaining portion left in Virginia was too small to form a county, and was annexed to another Virginia county, Ohio County. It is now Hancock County, West Virginia and part of Brooke County, West Virginia.

The areas of Yohogania County ceded to Pennsylvania included all of present-day Westmoreland County and parts of the present Allegheny (including most of the city of Pittsburgh), Beaver, Washington, and Fayette Counties. Ohio and Monongalia Counties also lost territory that they claimed to Pennsylvania (Washington, Greene and Fayette Counties) in this realignment.

=== Illinois and Indiana ===
By the time the United States was formed late in the 18th century following the American Revolutionary War, the areas that formed Illinois and Indiana were all contained in only one Virginia county, named Illinois County, with its county seat at Kaskaskia, Illinois. It was established by George Rogers Clark and the western Virginia militia during the Illinois campaign.

In 1787, the future states of Indiana and Illinois became part of the original Northwest Territory, part of which was partially carved from land previously in the far western portions of Virginia. The Northwest Ordinance of 1787 passed by the United States Congress allowed for the creation of as many as five states in the northwest portion of the Ohio Valley on lines originally laid out in 1784 by Thomas Jefferson.

Known as the Northwest Territory (not to be confused with the Northwest Territories of Canada), the new federal lands were east of the Mississippi River, and between the Ohio River and the Great Lakes. The region comprised more than 260,000 square miles (670,000 km^{2}). The ordinance defined the boundaries of the future states, excluded slavery, and required that 60,000 inhabitants be present for statehood. Ultimately, the territory was organized into the present states of Ohio, Indiana, Illinois, Michigan and Wisconsin.

Subdivided from the Northwest Territory, the Indiana Territory came into being in 1800, and included both Indiana and Illinois. In 1816, Indiana became the 19th state. In 1818, Illinois became the 21st state.

=== Kentucky ===
As tensions flared into protest and then battle during the American Revolution, large numbers of Virginia settlers began migrating through the Cumberland Gap into what is now Kentucky. This region was originally governed as part of Fincastle County, Virginia, but was split off in 1776, and organized as Kentucky County. Four years later it was divided into Fayette, Jefferson, and Lincoln counties. New counties were subsequently created from portions of those counties, and in 1792, the region, then containing nine counties, separated from Virginia to form the Commonwealth of Kentucky.

==== List of lost counties ====
The nine Virginia counties lost when Kentucky was admitted to the Union as the 15th state in 1792 were (alphabetically):

- Bourbon County
- Fayette County
- Jefferson County
- Lincoln County
- Madison County
- Mason County
- Mercer County
- Nelson County
- Woodford County

=== West Virginia ===
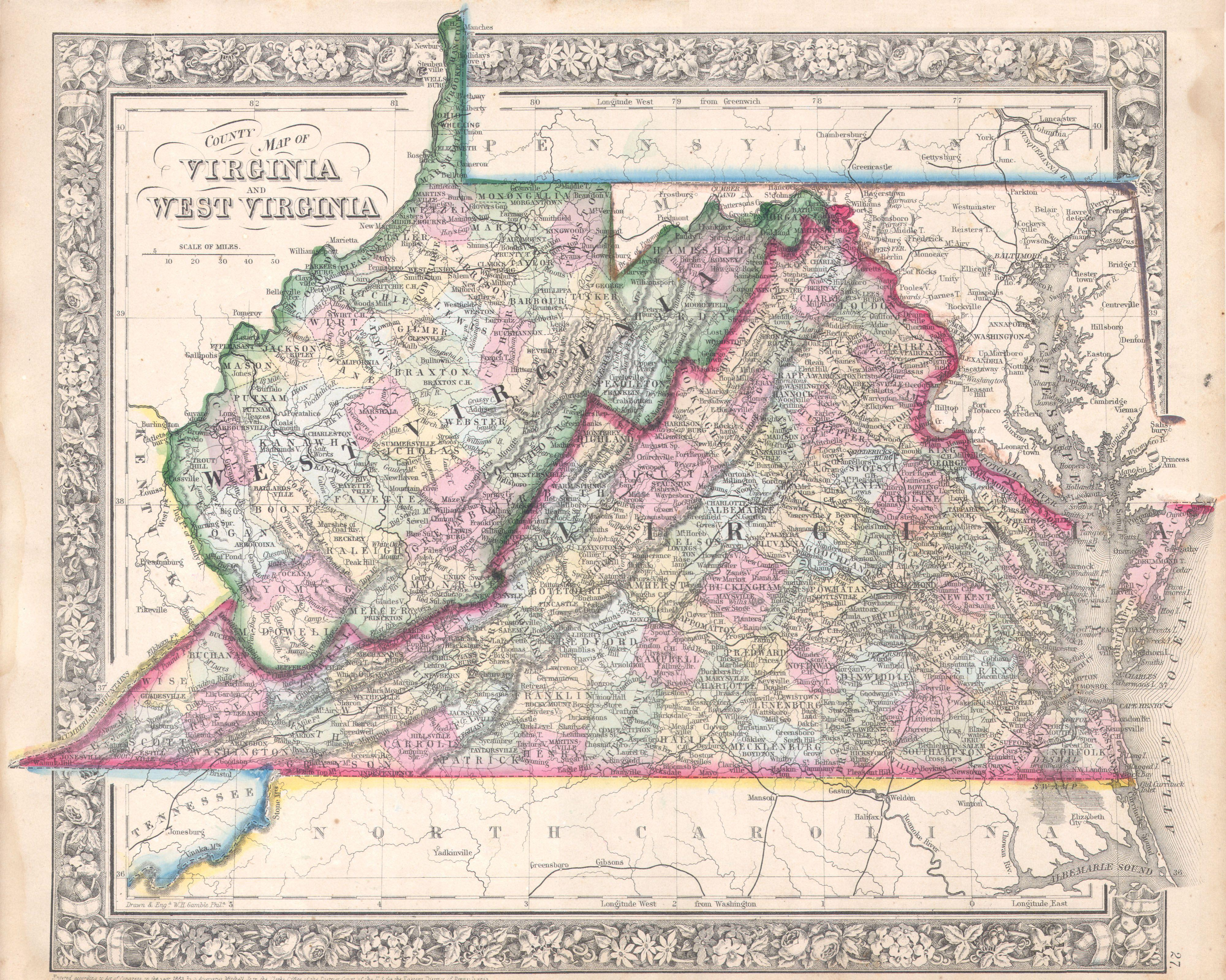
An 1864 county map of Virginia and West Virginia following their separation.

Much as counties were subdivided as the population grew to maintain a government of a size and location both convenient and of citizens with common interests (at least to some degree), as Virginia grew, the portions that remained after the subdivision of Kentucky in 1776 became more populated. For the western areas, problems were the distance from the state seat of government in Richmond and the difference of common economic interests resultant from the tobacco and food crops farming, fishing, and coastal shipping on the Eastern Continental Divide (waters that drain to the Atlantic Ocean) along the Allegheny Mountains, and the interests of the western portion, which drained to the Ohio and Mississippi rivers and the Gulf of Mexico. The western area focused its commerce on neighbors to the west, and many citizens felt that the more populous eastern areas were too dominant in the State Legislature and insensitive to their needs. Major crises in the Virginia state government were averted during the period before the American Civil War, but the underlying problems were fundamental and never well-resolved.

Though slavery was not the major economic issue for the western counties, which were much less dependent upon large scale labor-intensive farming than their eastern counterparts, states rights were an issue for the majority of Virginians, regardless of geographic location. The American Civil War brought Virginia's internal problems with eastern and western conflicting state governmental needs to resolution. The early occupation of the western lands by Union forces and Virginia's divided loyalties led to the formation of the new State of West Virginia, which was admitted to the Union in 1863.

While the total area lost when West Virginia split from the commonwealth was less than what had been lost 70 years earlier, Virginia lost a far greater number of counties as a result of this partition then it had in 1792 – 50, as opposed to nine. Additionally, as the names attached to some of the counties lost when Kentucky separated had been reused by Virginia for new Trans-Allegheny region counties during the early 1800s, those names were lost a second time. Ironically, Virginia has twice named a county for one of its most revered sons, Thomas Jefferson, and lost the county each time to the formation of another state.

==== List of lost counties ====
The 50 Virginia counties lost when West Virginia was admitted to the Union as the 35th state in 1863 were (alphabetically):

- Barbour County
- Berkeley County
- Boone County
- Braxton County
- Brooke County
- Cabell County
- Calhoun County
- Clay County
- Doddridge County
- Fayette County
- Gilmer County
- Greenbrier County
- Hampshire County
- Hancock County
- Hardy County
- Harrison County
- Jackson County
- Jefferson County
- Kanawha County
- Lewis County
- Logan County
- Marion County
- Marshall County
- Mason County
- McDowell County
- Mercer County
- Monongalia County
- Monroe County
- Morgan County
- Nicholas County
- Ohio County
- Pendleton County
- Pleasants County
- Pocahontas County
- Preston County
- Putnam County
- Raleigh County
- Randolph County
- Ritchie County
- Roane County
- Taylor County
- Tucker County
- Tyler County
- Upshur County
- Wayne County
- Webster County
- Wetzel County
- Wirt County
- Wood County
- Wyoming County

In 1866, Virginia unsuccessfully challenged in the Supreme Court the secessions of Berkeley and Jefferson Counties.

==== List of lost cities and towns ====
Also lost to Virginia with the formation of West Virginia were many cities and towns.

- Beckley
- Bath (Berkeley Springs)
- Beverly
- Capon Springs
- Charles Town
- Charleston
- Clarksburg
- Fairmont
- Fayetteville
- Frankfort
- Franklin
- Gerrardstown
- Grafton
- Harper's Ferry
- Harrisville
- Hedgesville
- Lewisburg
- Martinsburg
- Middlebourne
- Moorefield
- Moundsville
- Morgantown
- New Cumberland
- New Martinsville
- North River Mills
- Okonoko
- Parkersburg
- Paw Paw
- Philippi
- Piedmont
- Point Pleasant
- Princeton
- Ripley
- Romney
- Shepherdstown
- Springfield
- St. George
- St. Marys
- Summersville
- Triadelphia
- Union
- Valley Grove
- West Liberty
- Weston
- Wheeling
- White Sulphur Springs

=== Summary ===
By the time Virginia drafted a new state constitution during Reconstruction, 62 former counties had become located in other states. Of course, many cities and towns were "lost" in those areas as well.

== Areas now in Virginia ==
Virginia began "losing" counties, cities, and towns as almost as early as they were formed. The reasons, some known and some unknown, vary widely. The very first town, Jamestown, first settled in 1607, is probably the best known of all of these.

=== Due to patterns of commerce and development ===
Over the period from the beginning of the 17th century through modern times, much of the development of Virginia, as well as the establishment and major changes in communities were relative to patterns of commerce and transportation. For the Native Americans and early European settlers, the natural waterways were the principal paths of commerce, and communities were often located along them. Former Indian trails, often no larger than footpaths, evolved into stagecoach routes. The lessons of floods joined advancements in bridge-building to modify the viability of some locations. The construction of canals expanded the reach of water-borne traffic.

During the first half of the 19th century, the emerging technology of railroads dramatically impacted the economics associated with transportation. Hundreds of new locations were established to service either the railroads' operating requirements, such as fuel and water, and/or the needs of freight and passenger services. By the early 20th century, the emergence of automobiles and motor vehicles supplanted some of the earlier uses of waterways and railroads, adding even more locations in some instances, even as activities at many of the older locations withered, to the extent that some were completely abandoned.

Naming of locations often related to prominent local families, financiers in some cases, and frequently utilized nearby geographic features. With the inception of Rural Free Delivery of the U.S. Mail, some names were changed to avoid confusion from duplications and similarities.

=== Voluntary status changes ===
Virginia law provides several mechanisms for changing the status of a locality. It is possible for an entity to change so that it has either greater or fewer local powers and responsibilities.

Unincorporated towns or communities in some counties may become incorporated towns, which are still within the respective county. Incorporated towns may become independent cities. Any of the above may act to merge or consolidate with a neighbor.

Likewise, it is possible to simplify status. Incorporated towns may relinquish their charters. Some independent cities have been allowed to revert to incorporated town status and rejoin contiguous counties.

=== Annexation and consolidation ===
Virginia law provides for incorporated towns and independent cities to have the power to annex portions of contiguous localities at a lesser level. For example, incorporated towns may seek unincorporated territory in a county. Independent cities may seek additional unincorporated territory in a county or territory located in an incorporated town. Independent cities may not seek annexation from each other.

Many leaders have felt that Virginia's annexation laws are a barrier to regional cooperation among localities, creating an air of mistrust, and a feeling among citizens that such changes often take place against their will. Many of the state's needs may be met best through regional cooperation, which is discouraged by annexation issues. A moratorium on many major annexations has been in place since the late 20th century by actions in the Virginia General Assembly.

Consolidation of counties, cities, and towns is also possible, but only as authorized by special legislation of the Virginia General Assembly. The last wave of consolidations took place in the Hampton Roads area between 1952 and 1976.

=== Jamestown ===
The first English settlers in Virginia chose Jamestown Island largely because they had been advised by the Virginia Company to select a location that was easily defensible. An additional benefit of the site was that the land was not occupied by Indians (Native Americans). This was largely due to the inhospitable terrain and poor conditions, which also caused most of the early settlers to die of disease and starvation. Jamestown was abandoned for the first time for only a day. In the late spring of 1610, following a winter that became known as the Starving Time, the surviving settlers packed up and set sail down the James River toward Hampton Roads, the Chesapeake Bay, and the Atlantic Ocean. They encountered a new supply convoy headed for Jamestown on an expedition led by the new governor appointed by King James, Thomas West, 3rd Baron De La Warr. Among the group leaving was a young businessman named John Rolfe, who had lost both his wife and small child since leaving England. Despite his misfortune to that point, Rolfe possessed experimental seeds for a tobacco strain that became key to the colony's economic survival. The settlement began to prosper by 1617, and became the capital of the colony in 1619 when the House of Burgesses was established.

Despite Virginia's successes, Jamestown had a troublesome climate, lacked a natural source of fresh water, and was plagued by mosquitoes. The statehouse burned several times and was, nevertheless, rebuilt. However, after yet another fire in the 1690s, the capital was relocated in 1699 to Middle Plantation, on higher ground about 12 miles (20 km) east, soon renamed Williamsburg. The town-like settlement at Jamestown was finally abandoned shortly thereafter.

Most of the area soon reverted to its natural state and actually became an island as the isthmus was severed by weather events at an unrecorded later date. By the 1750s, the land was a heavily cultivated plantation, and remained mostly farmland until 1892.

In 1892, Jamestown was purchased by Mr. and Mrs. Edward Barney. The following year, the Barneys donated 2 1/2 acres of land, including the 1639 church tower, to Preservation Virginia (formerly known as the Association for the Preservation of Virginia Antiquities). By that time, erosion from the river had eaten away the island's western shore. Visitors began to conclude that the site of James Fort lay completely underwater. With federal assistance, a sea wall was constructed in 1900 to protect the area from further erosion.

Colonial National Monument was authorized by the U.S. Congress on July 3, 1930. It was established on December 30, 1930. On June 5, 1936, it was re-designated a national historical park, and became known as Colonial National Historical Park.

In 1934, the National Park Service obtained the remaining 1500 acre (6.1 km^{2}) portion of Jamestown Island that had been under private ownership. The National Park Service partnered with the APVA to preserve the area and present it to visitors in an educational manner.

In 1957, for the 350th anniversary of the founding of Jamestown, the National Park Service restored the isthmus to Jamestown Island, making it accessible as a peninsula once again and the Commonwealth of Virginia built Jamestown Festival Park. The island and the former Festival park remained as a permanent attractions after the 1957 celebration, and with many enhancements, are now known respectively as Historic Jamestowne and Jamestown Settlement.

The archaeological remains of the original 1607 fort, which had been protected by the sea wall, were discovered in 1994 by the Jamestown Rediscovery project. Additional significant archaeological discoveries have shed even more light upon the early days of Jamestown in the years since, and the work is ongoing.

Jamestown has been reborn in a way, but it remains an historical site and not an actively inhabited town. Today, only wildlife and perhaps security personnel from the U.S. Park Police regularly spend the night on the island.

=== Eight lost shires ===
Since there are no "shires" in Virginia, and there have been none since the terminology was changed to "county" within a few years of their creation in 1634, all could be considered lost to posterity, at least in name. However, of the eight shires of Virginia created by the Virginia House of Burgesses (predecessor to the Virginia General Assembly) and King Charles I of England in 1634, five still exist in their original political form as counties in Virginia as of 2006, though all have lost some area and some have endured name changes. Some of their courthouses contain land records and other documents that predate the shires of 1634, though some were heavily damaged during the Revolutionary War and Civil War, which both took a heavy toll on eastern Virginia.

==== Present-day extant ====
The five still-existing original shires of Virginia are:

- Charles City Shire (1634–1643) became Charles City County
- Charles River Shire (1634–1643) became Charles River County in 1636, then York County
- James City Shire (1634–1636) became James City County
- Henrico Shire (1634–1642) became Henrico County
- Warrosquyoake Shire (1634–1637) became Isle of Wight County

==== Extinct ====
The three original shires of Virginia that no longer exist in their original political form are:

- Accomac Shire (1634–1643) (extinct)
- Elizabeth River Shire (1634–1636) became Elizabeth City Shire in 1636, and then Elizabeth City County (now extinct)
- Warwick River Shire (1634–1643) became Warwick County, later City of Warwick (now extinct)

=== Nineteen lost counties ===
19 counties once located in parts of Virginia that are still within the state either no longer exist or radically changed their names.

One of these, Alexandria County (not to be confused with the City of Alexandria) left Virginia for approximately 56 years (1791–1847) to become part of the District of Columbia. 74 years after its retrocession to Virginia, its name was changed to its present name, Arlington County. At only 26 square miles (67 km^{2}), it is Virginia's smallest county in land area.

Two other current counties in the state re-used the names of older lost counties. These newer counties (one name earlier lost to Kentucky, the other on the following list) are respectively, Madison and Rappahannock. Both the newer counties of that name are located in Virginia's Piedmont region.

The extinct counties of Virginia (alphabetically) are:

- Alexandria County (1749–1791) and (1846–1920) (was part of the District of Columbia 1791-1846), changed its name to become Arlington County in 1920
- Charles River County (1637–1643) renamed York County
- Dunmore County (1772–1778) renamed Shenandoah County
- Elizabeth City County (1643-1952) consolidated with the Town of Phoebus into the independent City of Hampton
- Fincastle County (1772–1776) divided into Montgomery County, Washington County, and Kentucky County (the latter of which later became the state of Kentucky)
- Lower Norfolk County (1637–1691) divided in Norfolk County and Princess Anne County
- Nansemond County (1646–1972) became the independent City of Nansemond (later consolidated with Suffolk)
- New Norfolk County (1636–1637) divided into Lower Norfolk County and Upper Norfolk County
- Norfolk County (1691–1963) consolidated with the independent City of South Norfolk to form the independent City of Chesapeake
- Patrick Henry County (1777–1790) was split into two counties, the western part becoming Patrick County and the rest becoming Henry County.
- Princess Anne County (1691–1963) consolidated with the independent City of Virginia Beach
- Rappahannock County (1656–1692) divided into Essex County and Richmond County (not to be confused with the current capital city of the same name located elsewhere in Virginia) (also not to be confused with the current Rappahannock County, founded in 1833, located in the northwestern portion of the state)
- Upper Norfolk County (1637–1646) became Nansemond County
- Warwick County (1643–1952) became the independent City of Warwick (later consolidated with Newport News)

=== Seven extinct independent cities ===
Seven Virginia cities are now considered extinct. These should not be confused with many small developments in the 17th century that were called "cities," but in modern terminology were towns.

Virginia laws enacted late in the 20th century enabled smaller independent cities to revert (or convert) to town status, which included rejoining a county. Advocates considered this option as a potential way to streamline local governmental structure. As of 2013, three small independent cities had done so and several others were reported considering it.

The "lost" independent cities of Virginia (alphabetically) were:

- City of Bedford (1968–2013) reverted to become an incorporated town in Bedford County
- City of Clifton Forge (1906–2001) reverted to become an incorporated town in Alleghany County
- City of Manchester (1874–1910) consolidated with the independent City of Richmond
- City of Nansemond (1972–1974) consolidated with the independent City of Suffolk
- City of South Boston (1960–1995) reverted to become an incorporated town in Halifax County
- City of South Norfolk (1919–1963) boundaries extended to include Norfolk County and name changed to independent City of Chesapeake
- City of Warwick (1952–1958) consolidated with the independent City of Newport News

=== Lost incorporated towns ===
Many of Virginia's incorporated towns grew to become independent cities. In fact, most of Virginia's current independent cities began that way. Towns that became cities of the same name include the current cities of Charlottesville, Danville, Fredericksburg, Norfolk, Poquoson, Portsmouth, Richmond, and Williamsburg, to name only a few. Not to be confused with Roanoke County, the town and then city of Roanoke made its two step transition in only a couple of years, the fast growth earning the nickname "Magic City."

It is actually rare in Virginia to find a city not previously incorporated as a town or, in a few instances, as a county. Only two, Hopewell and Newport News, are known to have begun directly as a city without previously incorporating as a town or county. Thus, if an incorporated town became a city of the same name, it is not listed here as extinct or lost.

The lost incorporated towns of Virginia were:

- Town of Barton Heights (incorporated 1896) in Henrico County was annexed by the City of Richmond in 1914.
- Town of Basic City (1890–1923) consolidated with town and later the independent City of Waynesboro
- Town of Berkley (unknown–1906) became part of City of Norfolk by annexation in 1906
- Town of Big Lick (1874–1882) became town and later the independent City of Roanoke (name change)
- Town of Castlewood (1991–1997) became a town on 20 March 1991. Voted for annulment of the town charter on November 4, 1997 and was disincorporated on December 31, 1997.
- Town of Central City (1885–1890) became town, later City of Radford (name change)
- Town of City Point (1826–1923) became part of the independent City of Hopewell by annexation in 1923
- Town of Clover (1895–1998) became a town on December 14, 1895. Voted for annulment of the town charter on November 3, 1998 and was disincorporated on December 31, 1998.
- Town of Columbia (1788–2016) was disincorporated by referendum on July 1, 2016. At the time, it was the smallest incorporated town in Virginia at 83 residents.
- Town of Fairmount (incorporated 1902) in Henrico County was annexed by the City of Richmond in 1914.
- Town of Ginter Park in Henrico County was annexed by the City of Richmond.
- Town of Goodson (1856–1890) became the independent City of Bristol (name change)
- Town of Highland Park in Henrico County was annexed by the City of Richmond in 1914.
- Holland in Nansemond County was consolidated with the rest of the former county and the former county seat town and small city of Suffolk to form the present large independent city known as Suffolk.
- Town of Kecoughtan in Elizabeth City County was annexed by the City of Newport News in 1927, though the original site settled under that name is in an adjacent area that became the Town and later City of Hampton.
- Town of North Danville/Town of Neapolis (1877–1896) was in Pittsylvania County, renamed Neapolis in 1894, and annexed by the City of Danville in 1896.
- Town of North Richmond was in Henrico County, annexed by the City of Richmond.
- Town of North Tazewell (1894–1963) was in Tazewell County, merged with the Town of Tazewell in 1963.
- Town of Phoebus (1900–1952) agreed to consolidation with Elizabeth City County into City of Hampton in 1952
- Town of Portlock (1947?–1952) in Norfolk County was annexed by City of South Norfolk in 1952.
- Town of Potomac (1908–1930) in Arlington County became part of City of Alexandria by annexation in 1930.
- Town of Salem in Fauquier County, Virginia became Marshall, Virginia.
- Whaleyville in Nansemond County was consolidated with the rest of the former county and the former county seat town and small city of Suffolk to form the present large independent city known as Suffolk.

=== Lost unincorporated towns and communities ===
Hundreds of communities in Virginia could be considered unincorporated towns. Most of these simply lost their identity through name changes, or growth and absorption into other municipal entities. However, while many earlier ones have disappeared in name, and are therefore "lost" as defined in this article, some really are entirely gone. One of those was the first settlement in Fairfax County, the town of Colchester.

A few of the lost towns of Virginia have very dramatic stories, and, somewhat like the early settlers of Jamestown, the residents experienced much hardship. While natural factors doomed Jamestown, they also literally wiped out Boyd's Ferry, which was virtually entirely destroyed by flooding of the Dan River in Halifax County around 1800. That town was rebuilt across the river in a better location, and grew to become the Town of South Boston, which was even an incorporated independent city for over 25 years before the citizens decided to rejoin Halifax County as an incorporated town again in 1995.

Conflicts with American Indians doomed several other early Virginia towns. Henricus (also known as "Henricopolis") is now a historic site in Chesterfield County. In the early 17th century, it was a boom town with an emerging school system until the Indian massacre of 1622 wiped it out, along with Wolstenholme Towne on Martin's Hundred Plantation downriver from Jamestown in James City County.

==== Taken by governments ====
Not all the destruction of communities that are completely gone occurred in earlier times. The state and federal government each had a hand in some major actions of this type, albeit theoretically at least for the public safety or good.

===== Shenandoah National Park =====
For example, in the creation of Shenandoah National Park and the Skyline Drive between 1924 and 1936, a number of families and entire communities were required to vacate portions of the Blue Ridge Mountains, mostly by actions of the Commonwealth of Virginia, which then ceded land to the federal government. Many residents in the 500 homes in eight affected counties of Virginia were vehemently opposed to losing their homes and communities. Most of the families removed came from Madison County, Page County, and Rappahannock County. U.S. President Herbert Hoover selected a spot on the Rapidan River for what would become a 164-acre (66-hectare) presidential retreat, Rapidan Camp.

The Commonwealth of Virginia, initially led by efforts of Harry Flood Byrd, used the Great Depression and access to jobs and modern amenities such as indoor plumbing and public schools to help justify the controversial dislodging of the mountain residents. It is true that the development of the Park and the Skyline Drive created badly needed jobs for many Virginians during the Great Depression. Nearly 90% of the inhabitants of the land taken by the government worked the land for a living. Many worked in the apple orchards in the valley and in areas near the eastern slopes. The work to create the National Park and the Skyline Drive began following a terrible drought in 1930 that destroyed the crops of many families in the area who farmed in the mountainous terrain, as well as many of the apple orchards where they worked picking crops. Nevertheless, it remains a fact that they were displaced, often against their will, and even for the very few who managed to stay, their communities were lost.

A little-known fact is that, while some families were removed by force, a few others (who mostly had also become difficult to deal with) were allowed to stay after their properties were acquired, living in the park until nature took its course and they gradually died. The last to die was Annie Lee Bradley Shenk who died in 1979 at age 92. Most of the people displaced left their homes quietly. According to the Virginia Historical Society, 85-year-old Hezekiah Lam explained, "I ain't so crazy about leavin' these hills but I never believed in bein' ag'in the Government. I signed everythin' they asked me.". Small family cemeteries were allowed to remain on the parkland, however. The lost communities and homes were a price paid for one of the country's most beautiful National Parks and scenic roadways. Seven new communities were created for the dislocated mountain people of the northern Blue Ridge. The Library of Virginia and Shenandoah National Park each have created exhibits that chronicle these mountain people and their lost homes.

===== Virginia Peninsula =====
In the eastern Virginia Peninsula region, during World War I, Mulberry Island in Warwick County became part of Camp Abraham Eustis, later expanded and renamed Fort Eustis. Nearby, a large tract of land in York County and a smaller portion of James City County property, occupied primarily by African Americans along the former Yorktown-Williamsburg Road in the unincorporated town of Lackey, was taken to create a military base now known as Naval Weapons Station Yorktown. Assisted by self-educated farmer and county magistrate, John Roberts (born approximately 1860), and known locally as "Judge Roberts," many of the displaced residents, including landowners and tenants, and watermen, gained financial compensation and relocated to the community of Grove in nearby James City County, as well as other nearby communities. Also taken was the community of Halstead's Point.

During World War II, the U.S. Navy took over a large area in York County and a smaller area in James City County which became known as Camp Peary. All residents of the entire towns of Magruder and Bigler's Mill were removed, and the areas were redeveloped for military use. Magruder had been named for Civil War Confederate General John B. Magruder, and a Civil War field hospital had occupied the site of Bigler's Mill. At Magruder, entire families and a church were compensated and relocated, with many again choosing Grove in nearby James City County. The Mt. Gilead Baptist Church on U.S. Route 60 in the Grove Community maintains cemeteries at both the old location (now on the closed base of Camp Peary) and the newer one.

Camp Peary later became well known as "The Farm," a training facility for joint forces in the U.S. military. Though the roads and structures are still there and occupied, access to the base is still restricted. It would be fair to say that the two towns are "lost" to Virginia, albeit for purposes of national defense. Also in 1943, the site of another nearby town, Penniman, was acquired and absorbed into the Cheatham Annex complex, which adjoins Camp Peary, and is part of the Naval Weapons Station Yorktown.

In the 1970s, the National Park Service relocated Slabtown residents to restore portions of the Yorktown Battlefield.

===== Northern Virginia =====
Likewise, in Northern Virginia, a Resettlement Administration program was begun to turn an area in Eastern Prince William County into a park for the nearby city of Washington, D.C. that resulted in the loss of three towns: Batestown, Hickory Ridge, and Joplin. Though some residents persisted, this changed with the onset of World War II, with the parkland becoming an Office of Strategic Services spy training facility. Similarly, nearby Marine Corps Base Quantico expanded for the war effort, engulfing the town of Kopp.

==== Listing ====
The following is an alphabetical list of "lost" unincorporated towns and communities in Virginia, and in some instances, their dispositions:

- Aiken's Landing was located in Henrico the area is now part of Varina.
- Algonquin Park was in Norfolk County
- Batestown became part of Prince William Forest Park
- Bayville was in Princess Anne County
- Beahm near Thornton Gap became part of Shenandoah National Park
- Begonia was located at the intersection of Routes 616, and 618 in Prince George
- Beldore Hollow became part of Shenandoah National Park
- Belfield became part of the Town and later the independent City of Emporia
- Big Meadows became part of Shenandoah National Park
- Big Ran became part of Shenandoah National Park
- Bigler's Mill in York County was taken into a U.S. Navy reservation during World War II and is now part of Camp Peary
- Blandford became part of the independent City of Petersburg in 1784
- Broadwater was located on Hog Island on the Eastern Shore
- Brown Cove became part of Shenandoah National Park
- Buzzard's Roost was in Elizabeth City County
- Canada was a small community of free African Americans near Charlottesville; it had disappeared by the early 20th Century
- Camden Mills was in Norfolk County
- Carvins Cove was flooded to create the Carvins Cove Reservoir
- Cobham in Surry County.
- Cockletown was in York County
- Cohoon's Bridge was in Nansemond County and was county seat for a time
- Cole was in Princess Anne County
- Creeds was in Princess Anne County
- Cumberland was a colonial town on the south side of the Pamunkey River in New Kent County that came within three votes of replacing Williamsburg as the capital of the Virginia Colony after the Williamsburg Capitol building was burned in 1748.
- Cypressville was a town in Princess Anne County
- Dam Neck Mills was located south of Rudee Inlet in Princess Anne County, later part of the independent City of Virginia Beach
- Davis Creek was in Nelson County
- Denbigh in Warwick County became part of the independent City of Warwick, later part of the independent City of Newport News
- Euclid was in Princess Anne County
- Ewell was in James City County
- Fourway became part of Shenandoah National Park
- Freedman's Village became part of Arlington National Cemetery
- Frazier Hollow became part of Shenandoah National Park
- Gayton was a small mining town in western Henrico County
- Glen Rock was in Princess Anne County
- Goose Pond Hollow became part of Shenandoah National Park
- Grand Contraband Camp was in Elizabeth City County
- Granite became part of the independent City of Richmond
- Greenwich was in Princess Anne County
- Grove Station was in James City County
- Groveton became part of Manassas National Battlefield Park
- Gum Grove in Warwick County was renamed Morrison, now a neighborhood of Newport News
- Halstead's Point became part of the US Naval Weapons Station Yorktown
- Hazel became part of Shenandoah National Park
- Henricus was wiped out by the Indian massacre of 1622 and not rebuilt.
- Henry Town, 17th century colonial settlement, later part of the independent City of Virginia Beach
- Hickory Ridge became part of Prince William Forest Park
- Hicksford, also known as Hick's Ford, became part of Town and later the independent City of Emporia
- Hoco, was at the end of Calthrop Neck in York County. The name was an abbreviation of Hopkins Oyster Company, where the community post office was located. After Hopkins Oyster company along with the post office was destroyed by fire in the 1920s the area became part of Tabb
- Holland became part of City of Nansemond, later the independent City of Suffolk
- Isle of Wight Plantation was a town in what is now Isle of Wight County
- Jeffs was in York County and became part of the independent City of Poquoson
- Joplin became part of Prince William Forest Park
- Kecoughtan (settled 1610) became part of the Town and later independent City of Hampton, though a nearby area incorporated as a town under the same name became part of the city of Newport News in 1926.
- Keyser Run became part of Shenandoah National Park
- Kopp became part of Marine Corps Base Quantico
- Lackey in York County was taken into a U.S. Navy reservation during World War I and is now part of the Naval Weapons Station Yorktown facility
- Lamb's Mill became part of Shenandoah National Park
- Little Island Station was located in Princess Anne County
- Lorraine was located in Henrico County
- Magruder in York County was taken into a U.S. Navy reservation during World War II and is now part of the Camp Peary facility
- Mellen was located in Warwick County
- Millwood became the incorporated Town of Phoebus, later part of the independent City of Hampton
- Minnieville became part of Dale City in Prince William County
- Morrison was in Warwick County, now a neighborhood of Newport News
- Another Mt. Pleasant in Franklin County became a part of Rocky Mount.
- Mulberry Island was a farming and fishing community in Warwick County. It became part of a U.S. Army Camp during World War that is now Fort Eustis.
- Negro Foot was in Hanover County
- Newmarket Corners was in Elizabeth City County
- New Market was a village in eastern Henrico County
- Newtown was the county seat of Princess Anne County before the American Revolutionary War
- Nicholson Hollow became part of Shenandoah National Park
- Novis was in the South Gap section of Bland County.
- Nutmeg Quarter in Warwick County became Hidenwood, now a neighborhood area in the City of Newport News
- Ocean View became part of the independent City of Norfolk
- Odd was in York County and became part of the independent City of Poquoson
- Old Rag became part of Shenandoah National Park (the mountain of the same name is still there)
- Osborne (or Osborne's) was located on the James River at the mouth of Proctor's Creek
- Penniman in York County became part of Cheatham Annex (military reservation)
- Pocahontas (not to be confused with the current incorporated Town of Pocahontas in Tazewell County) became part of the independent City of Petersburg in 1784
- Port Conway was across the Rappahannock River from Port Royal
- Port Walthall was located in Chesterfield County on the Appomattox River
- Port Warwick was a town in Chesterfield County on the James River at Falling Creek (destroyed during the American Revolutionary War and not rebuilt)
- Town of Potomac was annexed by the City of Alexandria
- Princess Anne became part of the independent City of Virginia Beach
- Punch Bowl (aka Punch Bowl Hollow) became part of Shenandoah National Park
- Ravenscroft became part of the independent City of Petersburg in 1744
- Rio Vista was in Henrico County on the Westham Plank Road
- Rocklin became part of Shenandoah National Park
- Rocky Ridge became Town of and later City of Manchester, now part of City of Richmond
- Roseland Farms became the incorporated Town of Phoebus, and later part of the independent City of Hampton
- Schoolfield became part of Danville
- Skyland Resort was a privately owned resort established in 1895 that became part of Shenandoah National Park.
- Slabtown was in Elizabeth City County.
- Slabtown was in York County.
- Spring Hill became part of the independent City of Manchester, later part of the independent City of Richmond
- Strawberry Banks became the incorporated Town of Phoebus, later part of the independent city of Hampton
- Sydney became part of the independent City of Richmond
- Titustown was in Norfolk County
- Tottem-Down-Hill was in Culpeper County
- Trone in Frederick County, west of Gore on Hollow Road
- Upper Pocosin became part of Shenandoah National Park
- Town of Varina was once the county seat of Henrico County, during the Civil War it was known as Aiken's Landing, now just a historic farm
- Wangle Junction
- Warwick Towne, formed in 1680 as the first county seat of Warwick County was abandoned in 1809. The area later became part of the independent City of Newport News
- Wash Woods was located at today's False Cape State Park in the City of Virginia Beach
- Wayland Crossing was renamed Crozet for Claudius Crozet in 1870
- Westham was in Henrico County on the Westham Plank Road
- Whaleyville became part of the independent City of Nansemond, later the independent City of Suffolk
- White House Landing was located on the Pamunkey River in New Kent County.
- Willard (also known as Willard Crossroads) was an unincorporated community demolished in 1958 to make room for Dulles International Airport.
- Wolstenholme Towne was wiped out by the Indian massacre of 1622 and not rebuilt.
- Yorke was a town in York County that no longer exists.
- Yorkville was in York County.

== See also ==
- Hampton Roads
- South Hampton Roads
- Virginia Peninsula
- List of former United States counties
