= Keyser Run, Virginia =

Former unincorporated community in Virginia

Coordinates: 38.752°N 78.263°W

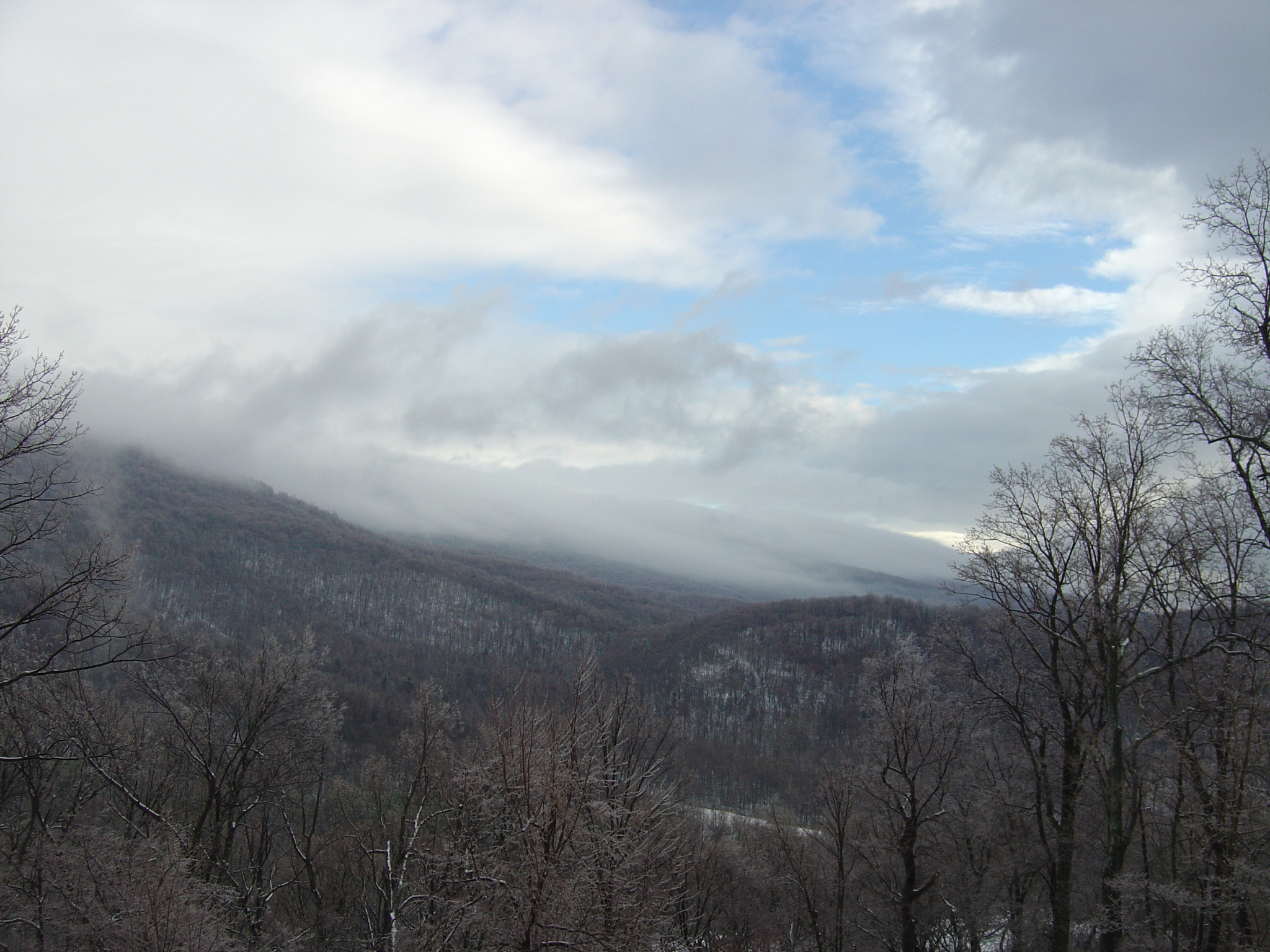
Photograph of the Keyser Run valley, circa 2007

Keyser Run, Virginia is an extinct unincorporated community in Rappahannock County, Virginia, located near what is now Flint Hill.

The Keyser Run community included homesteads, farms, and a cemetery in the mountains of the Shenandoah Valley. The area was named for the Keyser family of Virginia.

The community became part of Shenandoah National Park during the Great Depression, and part of the area is now referred to as Keyser Run. Keyser Mountain is also named for the former community.

== See also ==
- Former counties, cities, and towns of Virginia
- Skyline Drive
