= Carvins Cove, Virginia =

- Ghost town
- Location within Virginia Location within the United States
- Coordinates: 37°22′10″N 79°57′29″W
- Country: United States
- State: Virginia
- County: Roanoke & Botetourt
- Established: Early 1800s
- Abandoned: c. 1940s
- Named for: William Carvin
- Elevation: 1,168 ft (356 m)

Carvins Cove was a community in both Botetourt and Roanoke County, Virginia, United States, that was abandoned and subsequently inundated in order to create the Carvins Cove Reservoir by the City of Roanoke in the mid–1940s.

== History ==
The community was established in the early 19th century with the establishment of a grist mill at the falls along Carvins Creek. Its namesake, William Carvin, is recognized as the first settler in the Hollins area of present-day Roanoke County. Before the community was destroyed in the 1940s, it included the Rocky Branch School, Cove Alum Baptist Church, the Cove Alum Springs resort hotel, the Tuck-Away Park amusement park and at least 60 homes.

The demise of the community began in the early 1920s when the Virginia Water Company announced that a dam was to be constructed in the vicinity of the community to impound water. By November 1926 the company made public their intention to construct this dam at the Carvins Creek falls. Construction of the 80-foot (24 m) tall abutment was complete by 1928, however the actual reservoir would not be complete until the mid-1940s following the acquisition of the Roanoke Water Works by the City of Roanoke. By 1942, the City of Roanoke acquired the Roanoke Water Company and completed the process of purchasing the land in the Cove necessary to complete the reservoir. The final structures were auctioned by the city on February 14, 1944, effectively marking the end of the community.

All told, the city acquired over 12,000 acres (49 km^{2}) through purchase and condemnation at a cost of approximately $1 million. German Prisoners of War cleared some of the timber in the cove in the spring of 1945. The reservoir was completely filled by May 1946 when water topped the dam. The completed facility subsequently became the largest supplier of water to the city upon its official dedication on March 25, 1947.

Today the reservoir serves as the Western Virginia Water Authority's primary source of water for 130,000 customers in the Roanoke Valley. Additionally, the Cove is the ninth largest municipal park in the United States and offers numerous mountain biking, hiking and equestrian trails, connection to the Appalachian Trail and boating opportunities. Remnants of the former community can be seen in the numerous stone foundations that are still visible throughout the present day reserve. Additionally, during times of drought submerged foundations become visible as the shoreline recedes.

== See also ==
- Carvins Cove Natural Reserve
- Former counties, cities, and towns of Virginia
- List of ghost towns in Virginia

== Bibliography ==
- Kagey, Deedie (1988). When Past Is Prologue: A History of Roanoke County. Roanoke County Sesquicentennial Committee, Walsworth Press, Inc.
