= Basic City, Virginia =

Former town in Virginia, US

Coordinates: 38°04′15″N 78°52′27″W

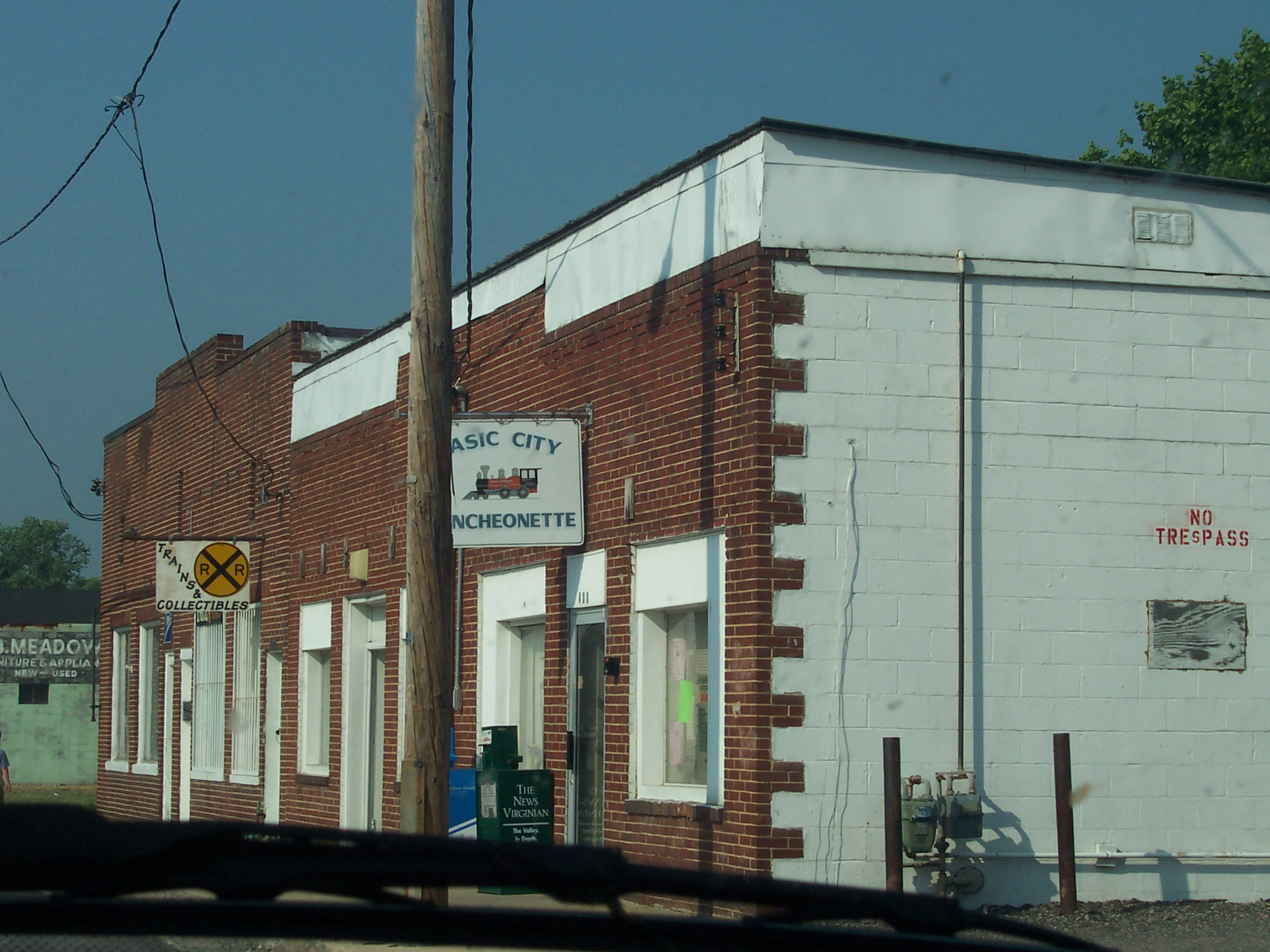
Basic City Luncheonette on Commerce Avenue.

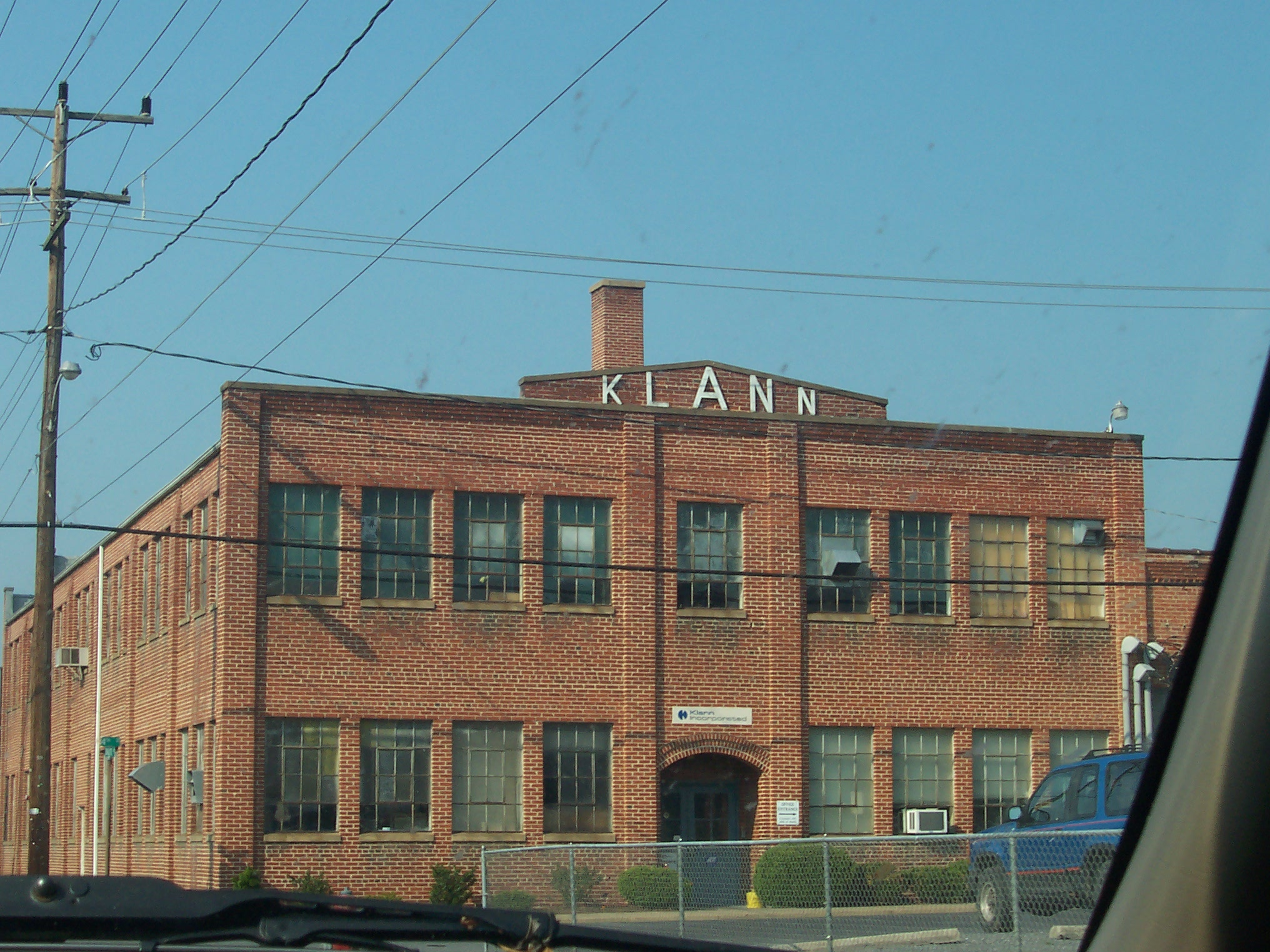
Klann Organ Works in what is now Waynesboro.

Basic City was an incorporated town located in Augusta County, Virginia, in the United States. Formed in 1890, it was named after a process for steel manufacture. This process was to be implemented in Basic City, and gave rise to land speculation. There was a boomtown rally of manufacturing and commercial development in Basic City between 1890 and 1893 as two railroads crossed here at a point called The Iron Cross: the Norfolk and Western and the Chesapeake and Ohio. Basic City was once bigger than the surrounding city of Waynesboro, Virginia. As the national economy experienced a depression between 1893 and 1896, sources of investment money disappeared and many new industries in Basic City experienced bankruptcy and closed. The town's real estate bubble burst and many businesses started between 1890 and 1893 did not survive.

In August 1923, Basic City consolidated with the adjacent Town of Waynesboro, which had been formed in 1798, following a vote by the two towns. The new name for the town was Waynesboro-Basic. It was renamed "Waynesboro" the following year by the Virginia General Assembly during their 1924 session.

In 1948, the Town of Waynesboro became an independent city. However, Basic City had become one of the "Lost Towns" of Virginia. In modern times, only a handful of buildings and businesses bear the Basic name. One of them is the Basic City Luncheonette. The city-owned Basic Park is another. The Basic City Beer Company is a recent enterprise set up in the east end of the otherwise-vacant former Virginia Metalcrafters fabrication complex. At least one church, Basic United Methodist Church (BUMc) has long had the word Basic in its name.
