= Kopp, Virginia =

- Ghost town
- Location within the state of Virginia Kopp, Virginia (Virginia) Kopp, Virginia (the United States)
- Coordinates: 38°35′24″N 77°26′45″W
- Country: United States
- State: Virginia
- County: Prince William
- Time zone: UTC−5 (Eastern (EST))
  - Summer (DST): UTC−4 (EDT)

Kopp is an extinct unincorporated community located in Prince William County, Virginia, United States. The town began in 1885 and consisted, at one time, of a country store, school, post office, and Bellehaven Baptist Church, and was the home to about 100 local farming families. The town ceased to exist in 1942 when the federal government added approximately 50,000 acres (200 square kilometers) to Marine Corps Base Quantico. The land upon which the residents of Kopp lived was purchased in what came to be known locally as "The Taking". It was located near the current town of Independent Hill on the western portion of the Marine Corps Base. No town buildings remain standing, and the church was demolished in about 1945, but the Marine Corps Base has been required to maintain the cemetery on the church grounds.

According to the Belle Haven church records, a concrete sidewalk was added in 1912. It is all that remains of the church today. The foundation and a part of the chimney from the Belle Haven School can also be found across MCB-1 from that sidewalk, east of a training shelter.

The town of Kopp could, as of 2016, still be located on Microsoft Terraserver, Mapquest, and Google Maps. The town lies on road MCB-1 near the "Combat Village", an artificial town constructed for urban warfare training.

== See also ==
- Former counties, cities, and towns of Virginia
