= Beahm, Virginia =

Former unincorporated community in Virginia, US

Coordinates: 38°39′40″N 78°19′12″W

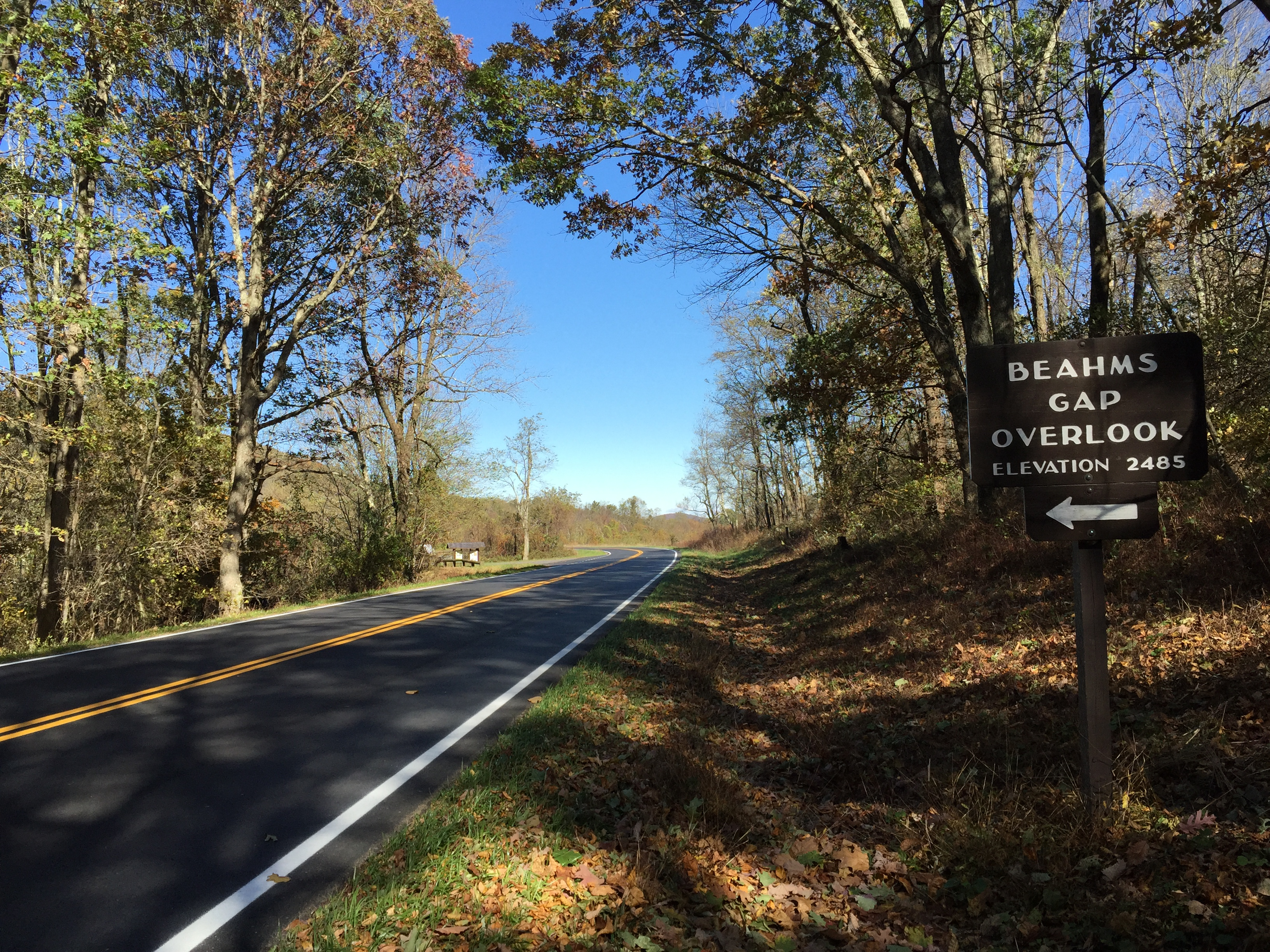
Sign for the "Beahm’s Gap Overlook" along Shenandoah National Park's Skyline Drive.

Beahm, Virginia was an unincorporated community in Page County, Virginia.

The Beahm community included homesteads, farms, cemeteries, a mill, and an outpost in the mountains of the Shenandoah Valley. The community was serviced by the Washington, Cincinnati, and Saint Louis Railroad. The community was named for the Beahm family who were prominent farmers and landowners in Page County.

The community became part of Shenandoah National Park during the Great Depression. Part of the area is now referred to as "Beahm's Gap Overlook" in Thornton Gap. Beahm Lane in Page County is also named for the area.

== See also ==
- Former counties, cities, and towns of Virginia
- Skyline Drive
