= Beldore Hollow, Virginia =

Extinct unincorporated community in Virginia

Coordinates: 38°18′45.46″N 78°37′11.06″W

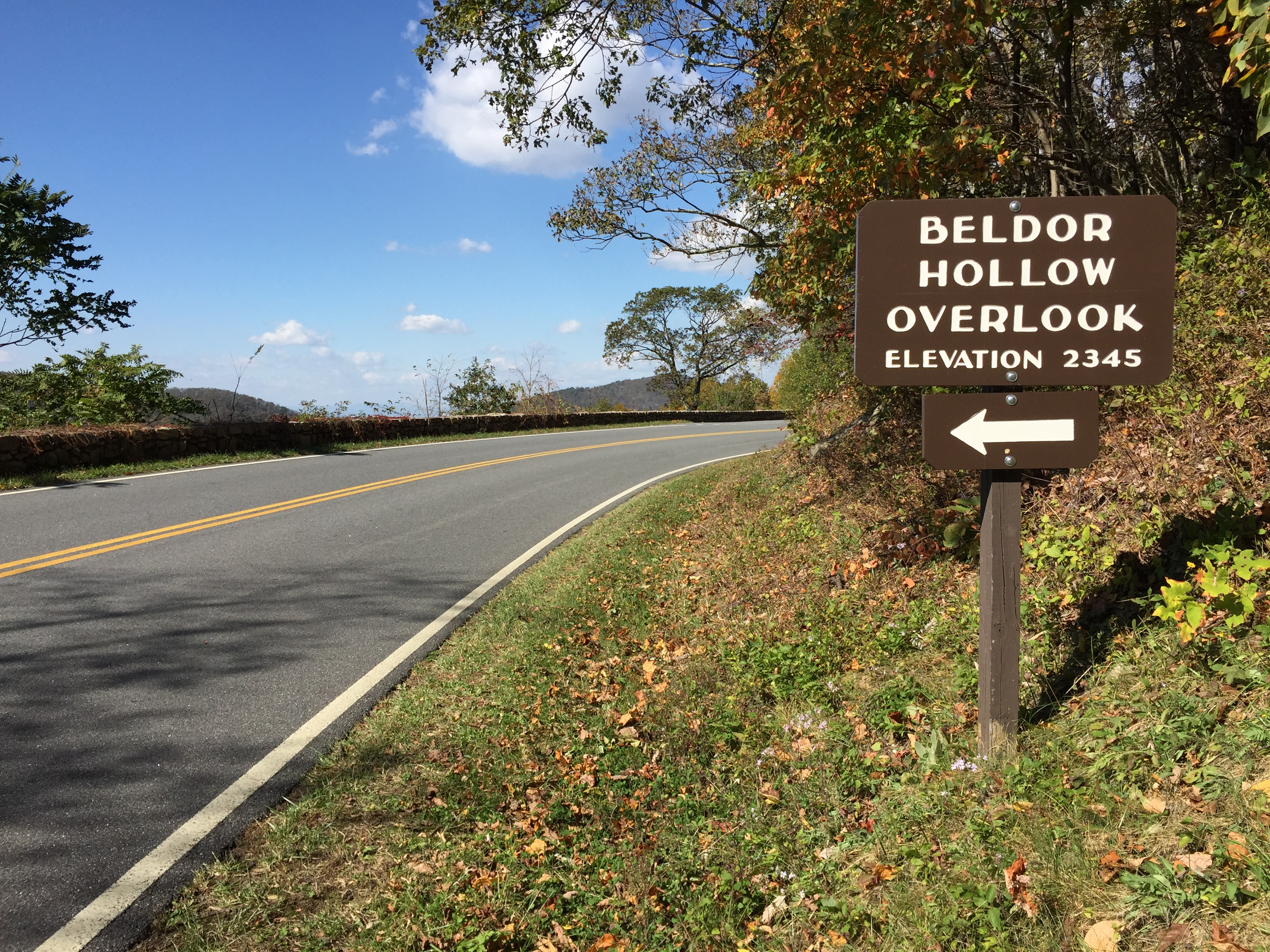
Sign for the "Beldor Hollow Overlook" along Shenandoah National Park's Skyline Drive in Rockingham County, Virginia

Beldore Hollow, Virginia (also referred to as "Beldor" and spelled "Beldor Hollow") is an extinct unincorporated community in Rockingham County, Virginia.

The Beldore Hollow community included homesteads, farms, cemeteries, a one-room school, and a village in the mountains of the Shenandoah Valley.

The community became part of Shenandoah National Park, and the area is now locally referred to as the "Beldor Hollow Overlook."

State Route 628 is locally referred to as Beldor Road.

== See also ==
- Former counties, cities, and towns of Virginia
- Skyline Drive
