= Blue Ridge Land Conservancy =

Non-profit land trust and conservation organization in Virginia

The Blue Ridge Land Conservancy (BRLC), formerly known as the Western Virginia Land Trust (WVLT), is a non-profit land trust and conservation organization headquartered in Roanoke, Virginia that seeks to preserve the wilderness and farmlands in the western portion of the Commonwealth of Virginia (not the State of West Virginia) from excessive commercial development. BRLC's service area contains ten counties: Bedford, Botetourt, Craig, Floyd, Franklin, Montgomery, and Roanoke.

In December 2012, the Western Virginia Land Trust changed its name to the Blue Ridge Land Conservancy.

== Conservation efforts ==
Since 1996, BRLC has been credited with protecting more than 56,000 acres (230 km^{2}) of land. In 2009, Roanoke, Virginia donated the second of two conservation easements on the 11,300 acres (46 km^{2}) Carvins Cove Natural Reserve to BRLC and the Virginia Outdoors Foundation, making the Carvins Cove Natural Reserve the largest tract of land protected with a conservation easement in Virginia. The easement was designed to protect 14 miles (23 km) of the viewshed from the Appalachian Trail as well as a major source of the drinking water supply for the Roanoke Valley. Carvins Cove Natural Reserve is the second-largest city park in the United States and the largest east of the Mississippi.

In August 2008, BRLC worked to preserve more than a mile of a Chesapeake Bay tributary stream and a wetland the size of 16 football fields in Botetourt County, VA.

== Donations ==
In April 2008, BRLC donated 145 acres (0.59 km^{2}) adjacent to the Grassy Hill Natural Area Preserve to the Virginia Department of Conservation and Recreation.

== Awards ==
In 2004, Scenic Virginia honored BRLC with its "Best Preservation of a Scenic Viewshed" award for preservation work along the Blue Ridge Parkway. In 2006, Scenic Virginia presented WVLT and a group of partners the same award for their efforts in preserving Tinker Mountain. Scenic Virginia also recognized BRLC in 2008 with its Scenic Water Corridor Preservation Award. In 2009, BRLC received a Governor’s Environmental Excellence Award along with the City of Roanoke, VA, and the Virginia Outdoors Foundation for the preservation of Carvins Cove Natural Reserve.

In 2009, BRLC presented Virginia Governor Tim Kaine with the A. Victor Thomas Environmental Stewardship Award in recognition of the governor's conservation efforts during his term in office.
