= Groveton, Prince William County, Virginia =

- Extinct unincorporated village
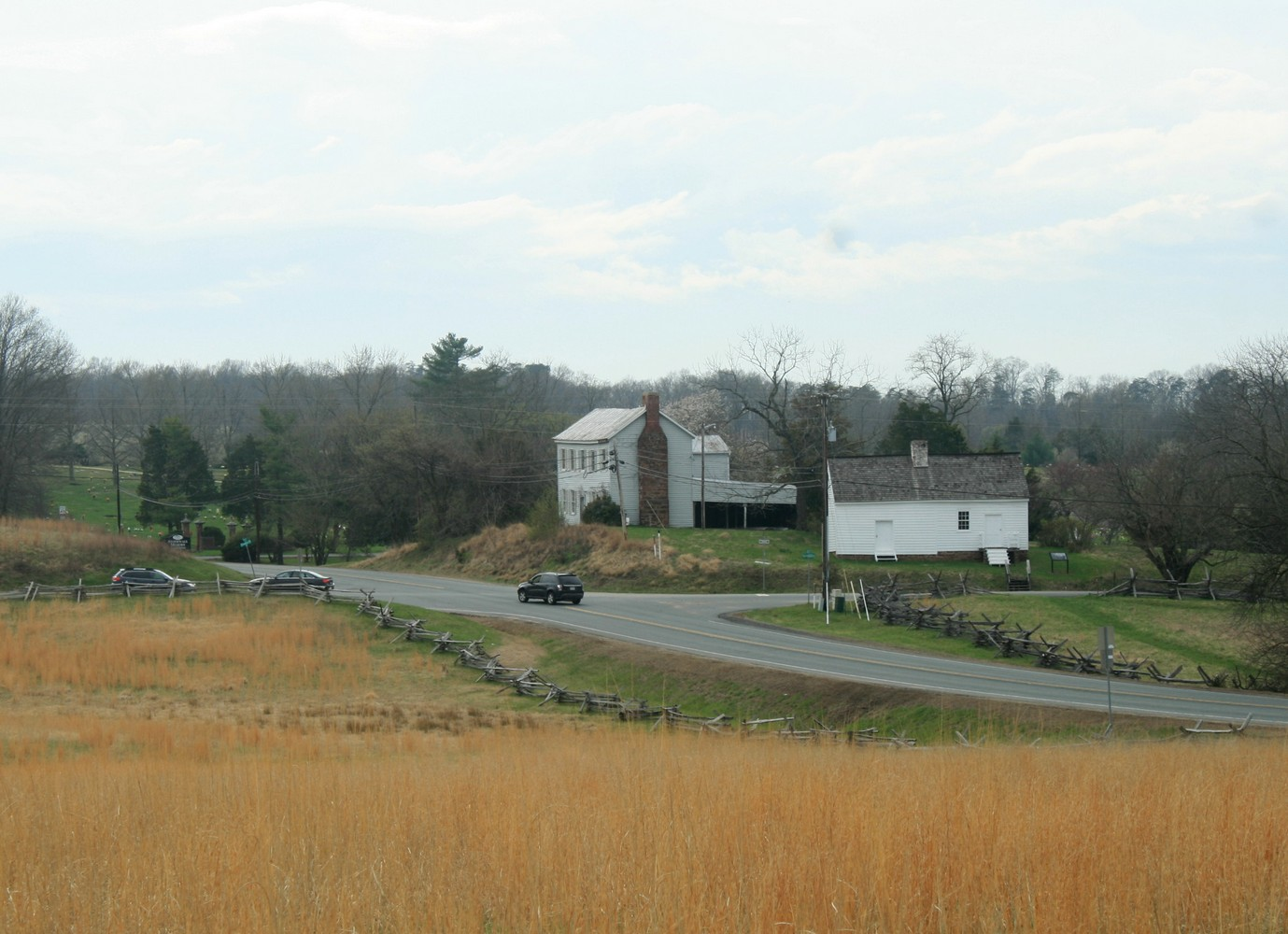

- Location within the state of Virginia Groveton, Prince William County, Virginia (Virginia) Groveton, Prince William County, Virginia (the United States)
- Coordinates: 38°48′45″N 77°32′54″W
- Country: United States
- State: Virginia
- County: Prince William
- Time zone: UTC−5 (Eastern (EST))
  - Summer (DST): UTC−4 (EDT)

Groveton is an extinct unincorporated Civil War era village in Prince William County, Virginia, United States. The village is located at the intersection of U.S. Highway 29 (Lee Highway) and Groveton Road on land that is now part of Manassas National Battlefield Park, a National Park Service property. The only remnant of the village is the L. Dogan House, a small, white frame structure, and the nearby Groveton Confederate Cemetery that contains the remains of over 260 Confederate soldiers.

== See also ==
- Former counties, cities, and towns of Virginia
