= Euclid, Virginia =

Unincorporated community in Virginia, US

Coordinates: 36°50′26″N 76°09′19″W

Euclid was a small unincorporated community in the former county of Princess Anne County, Virginia, now known as Virginia Beach. Euclid is located at an elevation of 16 feet above sea level.

== See also ==
- List of former counties, cities, and towns of Virginia
