= Carvins Cove Natural Reserve =

City park in Virginia, US

- Location within Virginia Location within the United States
- Type: Municipal park
- Location: Botetourt and Roanoke counties, Virginia
- Nearest city: Roanoke, Virginia
- Coordinates: 37°23′12″N 79°56′59″W
- Area: 12,700 acres (51 km^{2})
- Operator: Western Virginia Water Authority; Roanoke Parks and Recreation
- Open: All year

Carvins Cove Natural Reserve is a 12,700-acre (51 km^{2}) city park in Botetourt and Roanoke counties, Virginia. Managed by the Western Virginia Water Authority and the City of Roanoke, it is the fifth-largest city park in the United States, and the second-largest city park managed by a municipality. Within the park's boundary is Carvins Cove Reservoir and also the main ridgeline of Brushy Mountain, which rises about 1200 feet above the lake's waterline.

== History and ownership ==
In the 1930s, Carvins Creek was dammed to create the Carvins Cove Reservoir, which for many decades served as the primary water source for the City of Roanoke. A small rural community (called Carvins Cove) was displaced by the reservoir's creation, and some of its roads and housing foundations still become visible during droughts. A series of droughts in the late 1990s spurred the City of Roanoke and Roanoke County to create the Western Virginia Water Authority, which consolidated their water delivery systems.

The 630-acre (2.5 km^{2}) reservoir and the land below the 1,200-foot (370 m) contour are owned by the Authority; the land above the contour is owned by the City of Roanoke. In April 2008, Roanoke City Council placed 6,185 acres (25.03 km^{2}) of Carvins Cove under a conservation easement donated to the Western Virginia Land Trust and the Virginia Outdoors Foundation. The easement protects much of the Cove from inappropriate development and is the largest ever recorded in the Commonwealth of Virginia.

== Recreation ==
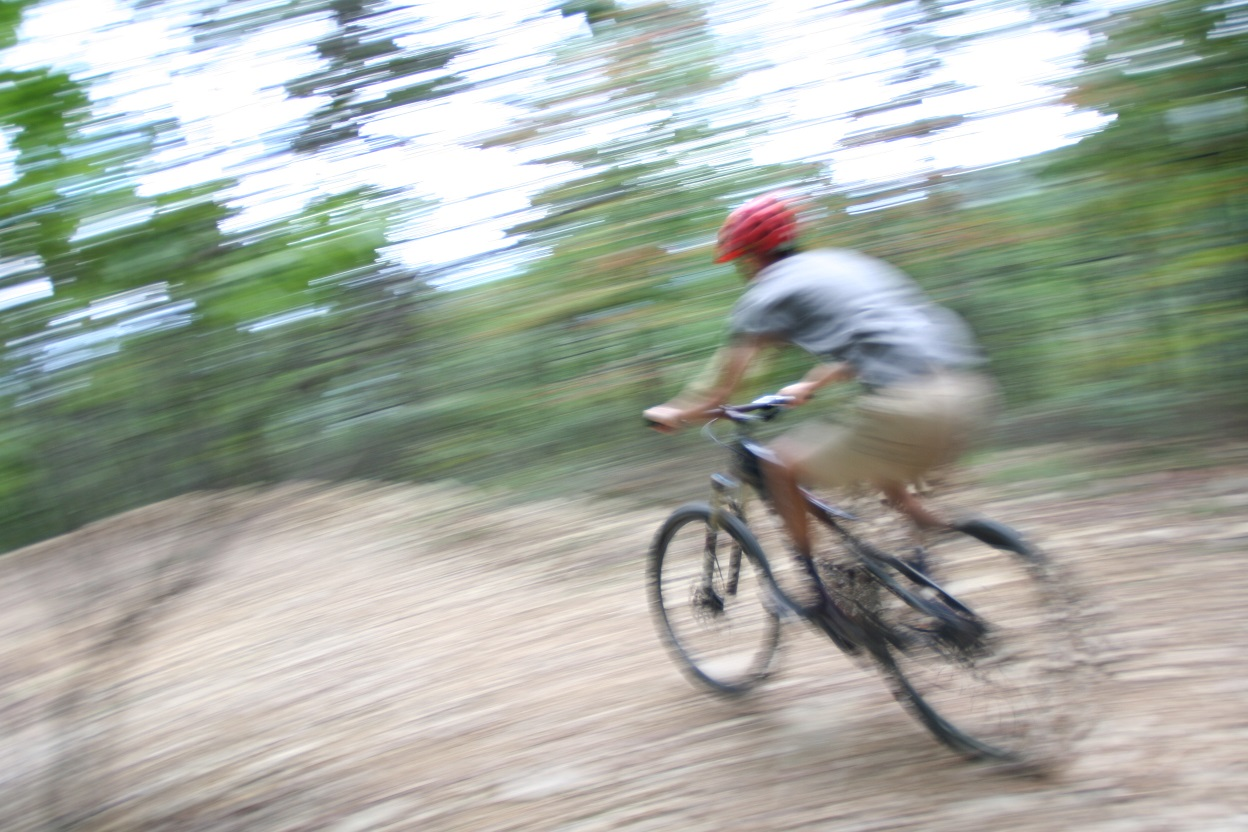
A mountain bike rider in Carvins Cove

Recreational activities, such as mountain biking, hiking, and equestrian activities, are allowed around the reservoir. Several mountain bike races are held at Carvins Cove each year, including the "XXC" endurance race which covers 43 miles of trails and involves climbs totalling over 6000 feet. Some downhill trails are considered expert-level only, and involve overall descents of over 1000 feet. Boating and fishing are allowed on the reservoir itself, but there are strict limits to preserve water quality. The fear of zebra mussels motivated the city to apply the first restrictions in the early 1990s.
