= Pine Bluff Daily Graphic =

Pine Bluff, Arkansas newspaper (1893–1942)

- Type: Daily newspaper
- Format: Broadsheet
- Founder(s): James W. Adams
- Publisher: Adams Printing
- President: James W. Adams (1893–1908)
- Founded: October 2, 1893
- Language: English
- Ceased publication: March 11, 1942
- City: Pine Bluff, Arkansas
- Country: United States
- ISSN: 2833-2016
- OCLC number: 19596361

Pine Bluff Daily Graphic, previously known as the Pine Bluff Weekly Graphic and the Pine Bluff Semi-Weekly Graphic, was an American daily newspaper published in Pine Bluff, Arkansas, between 1893 and 1942. The Sunday edition was known as the Pine Bluff Sunday Morning Graphic. It was founded by James W. Adams.
