= Cobham, Surry County, Virginia =

Former town in Virginia, United States

Coordinates: 37°10′18″N 76°46′12″W

Cobham was a small town in Surry County, Virginia, United States. It was established by an Act of the Virginia House of Burgesses in 1691, when each county in the Virginia Colony was directed set aside 50 acres (200,000 m^{2}) of land for a town. Storehouses were to be built for products imported and tobacco to be exported. It was ordered that the county sell half-acre lots for its citizens to inhabit the town. It was located at the mouth of Gray's Creek at the James River across and somewhat downstream from Jamestown. It was probably named for Cobham, in Surrey, England.

Cobham was active during the 18th and early 19th centuries, but eventually became one of the Former counties, cities, and towns of Virginia. According to the Surry County Historical Society, "today there is little evidence of the town, which became mostly farmland." The society reports that "farmers, while plowing the fields, have run into old foundations, as well as finding locks, broken china, and even a long-barreled pistol."

There is also a Cobham in eastern Albemarle County, Virginia. It is located at the intersection of Route 22 (Louisa Road) and Route 640 (St. John's Road / Cobham Station Lane), roughly halfway between Charlottesville and Louisa. The unincorporated community consists of horse farms and homes. Cobham had a train station until the early 20th Century, and one building remains next to the train tracks, thought to have been a feed store. The old train station building was moved to another site near Gordonsville where it is used as a home. The original one-story general store near the tracks was moved about two hundred feet up to Route 22, and with the addition of a two-story building in 1936, served as the Cobham General Store and Post Office until the mid-1990s. After serving other purposes, such as a tack store and internet business, the building was converted to a home in 2002.
