= Chattis Hill =

Village in Hampshire, England

Coordinates: 51.11540°N 1.53468°W

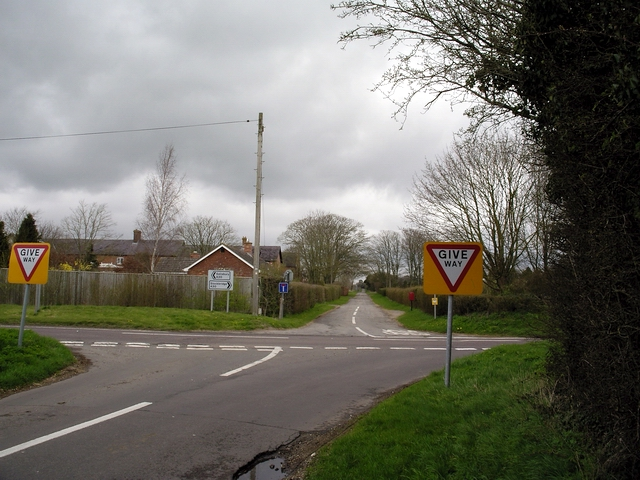
- Crossroads at Chattis Hill

- Location within Hampshire
- OS grid reference: SU326352
- Civil parish: West Tytherley
- District: Test Valley
- Shire county: Hampshire
- Region: South East
- Country: England
- Sovereign state: United Kingdom
- Post town: STOCKBRIDGE
- Postcode district: S020
- Dialling code: 01264
- Police: Hampshire and Isle of Wight
- Fire: Hampshire and Isle of Wight
- Ambulance: South Central
- UK Parliament: North West Hampshire

Chattis Hill is a hamlet in the Test Valley district of Hampshire, England. The village lies approximately 2.5 miles (4.0 km) west from Stockbridge, which both lie on the A30 road. At the 2011 Census the Post Office indicates that the population of the hamlet was included in the civil parish of Broughton.
