= Morrison, Virginia =

Unincorporated community in Virginia

Coordinates: 37°03′20″N 76°27′46″W

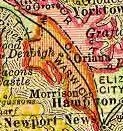
Morrison shows clearly in Warwick County on this 1895 map showing the lower Virginia Peninsula.

Morrison was a small unincorporated community in Warwick County, Virginia. After a municipal consolidation in 1958, it became a neighborhood of the independent city of Newport News.

== History ==
Originally known as Gum Grove, the town of Morrison was located in Warwick County east of the longtime county seat of Denbigh. In 1881, the community was made a station on the Chesapeake and Ohio Railway's Peninsula Extension which was completed from Richmond east down the Virginia Peninsula. It was renamed Morrison for Colonel J.S. Morrison, a construction engineer for the new railroad.

At Newport News Point in the extreme southeastern edge of Warwick County, on the harbor of Hampton Roads, new coal piers were built for the export shipment of bituminous coal from West Virginia. Soon, a new independent city was created there as Newport News in 1896.

Morrison post office was established February 2, 1883, and a public school was recorded in a deed dated August 16, 1906.

During World War I, Camp Morrison was located nearby about one mile from the James River. With 24 supply warehouses, Camp Morrison was used for the U.S. Army Air Corps and Balloon Corps personnel.

Morrison High School was built in the community after World War I, in 1926. It was renamed Warwick High School in 1948.

Warwick County, which included Morrison, became an independent city itself in 1952. Six years later, in 1958, by mutual agreement the City of Warwick was politically consolidated with the independent City of Newport News, assuming the latter's better-known name. Morrison gradually became a neighborhood area of Newport News as the portion which had been Warwick County became developed. As a primarily residential area, Morrison, which is also known locally as Harpersville, offers quiet tree-lined streets with easy access to shopping, recreation and schools. Camp Morrison Industrial Park is nearby.

== See also ==
- Former counties, cities, and towns of Virginia
