= Camp Elmore =

Camp Elmore may be:

- Camp Elmore, Florida
- Camp Allen
