= Mkokoni =

- Location within Kenya
- Coordinates: 1.97°S 41.3°E
- Country: Kenya
- Province: Coast Province
- Time zone: UTC+3 (EAT)

Mkokoni is a settlement in Kenya's Coast Province in the Lamu County.

The Köppen climate type is classified as a tropical dry savanna climate.

Mkokoni borders along the Western Indian Ocean and has extensive coral reefs along the coast.

United States military teams providing aid has been normalized in the Lamu County area since the mid 2000s. CJTF–HoA’s Maritime Civil Affairs Teams have implemented as of 2014, 200 projects in the county, mostly surrounding school renovations and water catchment projects.
