= NCHF =

NCHF may refer to:

- Non-cryptographic hash function
- The National Cooperative Housing Federation of India
- Navy Cargo Handling Force of the Navy Expeditionary Logistics Support Group (United States)
- Nicklaus Children's Hospital Foundation
