= Marine Corps Security Force Battalion Bangor =

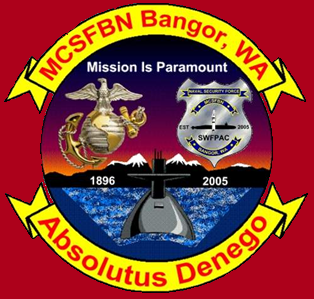
- Marine Corps Security Force Battalion Bangor logo
- Active: 1896–present
- Country: United States
- Branch: United States Marine Corps
- Type: Specialty battalion
- Role: National Strategic Asset Security
- Garrison/HQ: Naval Base Kitsap-Bangor, Washington
- Nickname: Bangor Marines
- Mottos: Absolutus Denego (Absolute Denial) 2008-Present; Previously: Mors de Contactus (Death on Contact) 1978-2008
- Anniversaries: September 16, 1896

Commanders
- Commanding officer: LtCol Ben Early
- Battalion Sergeant Major: SgtMaj Matthew O. Ingwerson
- Command Master Chief: MACM John A. Brooks

The Marine Corps Security Force Battalion Bangor (MCSFBn Bangor) is part of the Marine Corps Security Force Regiment. Its mission is to provide dedicated security support to Strategic Weapons Facility, Pacific (SWFPAC) operations.

== History ==
MCSFBn Bangor traces its lineage back to the establishment of the former Marine Barracks, Puget Sound Naval Shipyard on Sept. 16, 1896. The Barracks has since grown steadily in size and responsibility. On July 2, 2008, the unit was re-designated as Marine Corps Security Force Battalion, Bangor.

== Lineage ==
1896-1960

- Activated 16 September 1896 as Marine Barracks, Puget Sound Naval Station, Washington.
- Marine Detachment established 18 October 1919 at Naval Ammunition Depot, Puget Sound, Washington.
- Redesignated 30 November 1945 as Marine Barracks, Naval Ammunition Depot, Puget Sound, Washington.
- Redesignated 1 July 1948 as Marine Barracks, Naval Ammunition Depot, Bangor, Washington.
- Deactivated 1 July 1950 as all personnel transferred to Marine Barracks, Naval Ordnance Depot, Puget Sound, Keyport, Washington.
- Redesignated 23 April 1952 as Marine Barracks, Naval Torpedo Station, Keyport, Washington.
- Redesignated 30 May 1956 as Marine Barracks, Naval Ammunition Depot, Bangor, Washington.
- Deactivated 30 June 1960.

1964–Present

- Reactivated 1 January 1964 as Marine Barracks, Naval Ammunition Depot, Bangor, Washington.
- Relocated 23 November 1970 to Keyport, Washington, and redesignated as Marine Barracks, Naval Torpedo Station, Keyport, Washington.
- Placed under Operational Control of Naval Submarine Base Bangor, Washington, on 1 February 1977.
- Redesignated 15 June 1977 as Marine Barracks, Naval Submarine Base, Bangor, Washington.
- Redesignated 1 October 1978 as Marine Corps Security Forces Company, Bangor, Washington.
- Placed under Operational Control of Strategic Weapons Facility, Pacific, Bangor, Washington, on 23 April 1991.
- Redesignated during April 2008 as Marine Corps Security Force Battalion, Bangor, Washington.

== Unit awards ==
The following unit and campaign awards have been awarded to MCSFBn Bangor:

Navy/Marine Corps Navy Unit Citation (NUC) Streamer

- 1975-1979

Navy/Marine Corps Meritorious Unit Citation (MUC) Streamer with 4 Bronze Stars

- 1982-1985
- 1986-1988
- 1995-1997
- 2011-2014

World War I Victory Streamer

American Defense Service Streamer

American Campaign Service Streamer

World War II Victory Streamer

National Defense Service Streamer with 3 Bronze Stars

- Korean War June 27, 1950 - July 27, 1954
- Vietnam War January 1, 1961- August 14, 1974
- Persian Gulf War August 2, 1990 - November 30, 1995
- Global war on terrorism September 11, 2001 – Present day

Global War on Terrorism Service Streamer

== Personnel ==
The majority of the Navy personnel assigned are Masters-At-Arms specialist, while the majority of the Marines are Infantrymen.

Marines assigned to the battalion are assigned a secondary Military Occupational Specialty (MOS) of 8152 (Marine Corps Security Force Guard).

Junior Marines come direct to the unit after receiving their basic training at one of the Marine Corps Recruit Depots, followed by the School of Infantry (to become infantrymen) and Marine Corps Security Forces Training Company (for security forces specific training). Junior Marines on their first enlistment typically serve two years with the unit before receiving orders to a standard Marine Infantry battalion for the rest of their enlistment.

NCO's, SNCO's, and Officers may come from virtually any MOS in the Marine Corps, and are typically have at least four years in the Marine Corps. NCO's and above are considered to be on a career enhancing "B-billet", or Special Duty Assignment, and typically serve three years with the battalion.

== Personnel Reliability Program (PRP) ==
All personnel assigned to the unit must meet the vigorous standards of the Navy's Personnel Reliability Program (PRP). Failure to meet and maintain these standards results in reassignment to a conventional unit in the Fleet. Losing one's clearance can also be punished under the UCMJ.

== Training ==
All junior Marines assigned to MCSFBn Bangor must have completed the following training:

- Infantry Training Battalion at the School of Infantry (East/West) (SOI(E)/SOI(W)) - Teaches basic infantry skills to new Marines.
- Marine Corps Security Force Training Company - (NSA Northwest, Chesapeake, VA) - Teaches Security Forces specific skills and procedures, basic room clearing, shotgun and pistol marksmanship, and unarmed/armed restraint techniques and combat skills.

NCO's typically attend the same training as the junior Marines, while SNCOs and Officers attend a shortened supervisor's course.

== Organization ==
The Battalion is organized into several Marine Guard Platoons and Navy Master-At-Arms Divisions. There is also a Recapture Tactics Team (RTT) organic to the battalion. Details regarding the exact organization, operations, and facilities is confidential information, covered by federal non-disclosure agreements.

Externally, MCSFBn operationally reports to SWFPAC, while administratively answering to Marine Corps Security Force Regiment. MCSFBn also interacts with the U.S. Department of Energy, the Defense Threat Reduction Agency, and the U.S. Strategic Command.

=== Ceremonial Drill Team and Summer Parades ===
In addition to its guard mission, the MCSFBn maintains a Ceremonial Drill Team which is the only one of its kind in the Pacific Northwest. The unit is active at a number of regional civic and sporting events and unit sponsored summer parades. All of these functions are in addition to each Marine being a member of the guard force. The annual Summer Parade has been hosted by the battalion every summer since 1977.

=== Recapture Tactics Team (RTT) ===
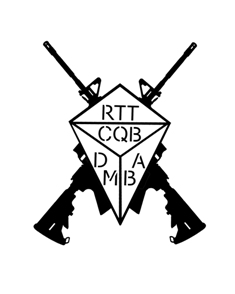
Recapture Tactics Team, Bangor logo

Recapture Tactics Team
- Active: 1987–present
- Nickname: CQB Cowboys
- Mottos: "Speed, Surprise, and Violence of Action"

The Recapture Tactics Team (RTT) specializes in SWAT procedures. Marines and Sailors are given an opportunity, if the Command allows them, to try out for RTT. Typically, only a small fraction of the Marines and Sailors who are permitted to try out for CQB Platoon are actually selected from the grueling two-week selection process. Those who are selected then have a tactical spin-up (a period of intensive preparatory training,) before reporting to USMC CQB School where they undergo an intensive seven-week advanced combat marksmanship and dynamic assault course. The Marines and Sailors learn to violently recapture and take back by force, the United States personnel and property that has been stolen or otherwise compromised.

All RTT Marines attend the Close Quarter Battle School, which is 7 weeks long (not including platoon tryouts, spin-ups, and the post-Schoolhouse breaking in period.) Afterward, they are eligible to attend the following courses, pending their command's approval:

- Designated Marksman Course
- Assault Breacher / Methods of Entry or MOE, (small unit demolition and door breaching tactics)

== Significant Events ==
=== 1989 Marine Suicide ===
On 14 January 1989, an 18- year-old Marine shot himself in the head with his M-16 rifle while stationed in a guard tower. A Navy investigation revealed discrepancies with his behavior that were not reported as required under the PRP program. A Stanford University report below in the external links portion provides additional details.

=== 2001 Vehicle Accident ===
In July 2001, a V-150 armored vehicle rolled over. Two 20-year-old Marines died of injuries and three other Marines were injured. A 2001 Kitsap Sun article below in the external links portion provides additional details.

=== 2009 Security breach ===
In November 2009, 5 senior citizens were arrested after breaching the base perimeter security and attempting to gain access to one of the restricted areas of the base. A 2009 Kitsap Sun article below in the external links section provides additional details.

== In Popular Books ==
The 2006 book "Blood Stripes: The Grunt's View of the War in Iraq" was written by a former Marine officer who had served at Bangor and follows several junior Marines from their time at Bangor through the war in Iraq and onwards to their civilian life.

== Notable Marines ==
Former Marine Sgt Jarrett Kraft was stationed with (then) MCSFCo Bangor's 1st Platoon before serving in Iraq where he earned the Navy Cross in Dec. 2004. One of the Marines he was attempting to aid was Lance Corporal Eric Hillenburg, who had also served with Kraft at Bangor. LCPL Hillenburg died of wounds received during the battle. Details on both are provided below in the external links section.

== See also ==
- Marine Corps Security Force Battalion Kings Bay
- 43 Commando Fleet Protection Group Royal Marines
- Marine Security Guard
- Office of Secure Transportation
