= Navy Cargo Handling Battalion =

US Navy logistics units

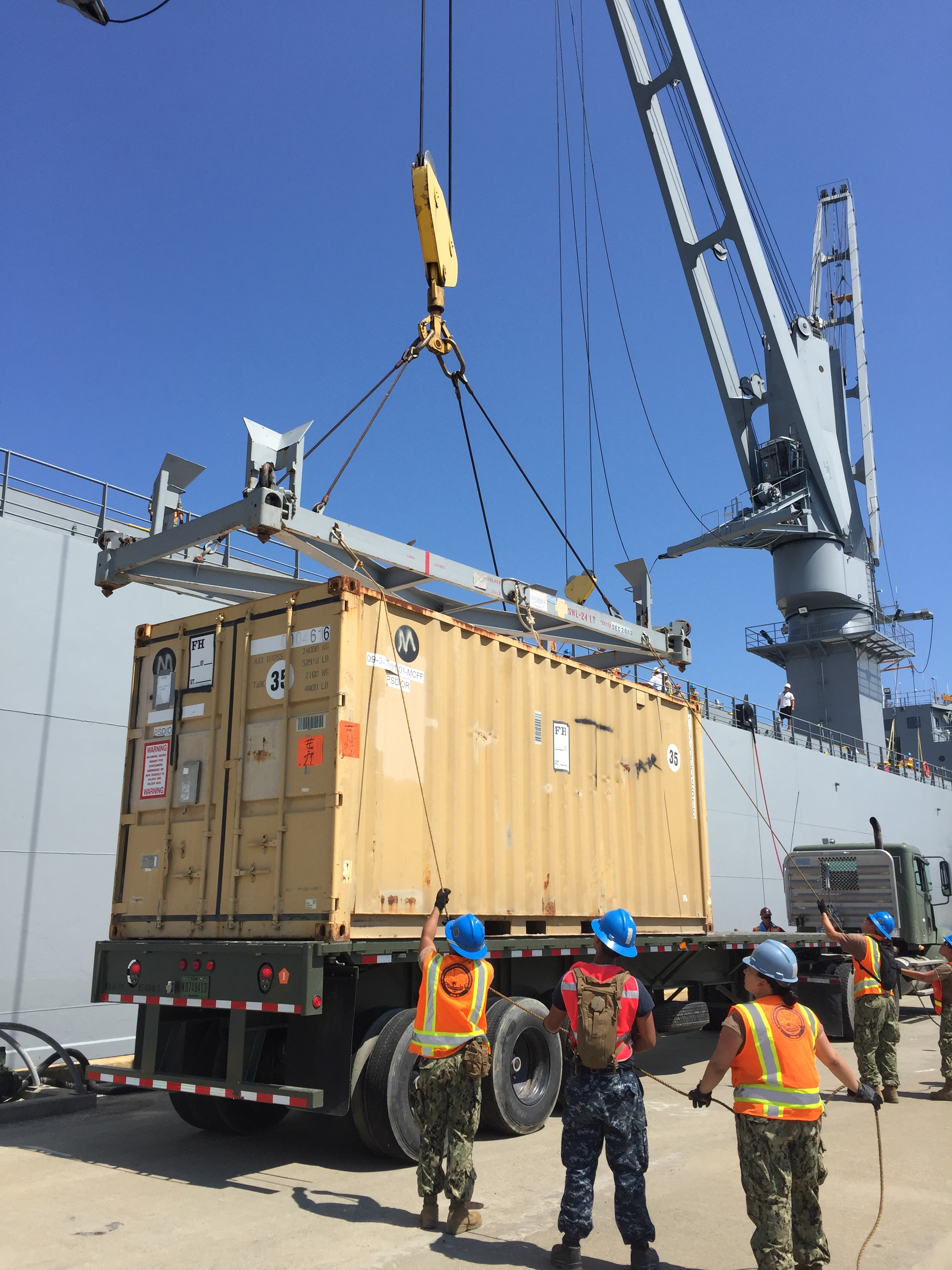
NCHB-14 personnel engaging in pre-deployment training exercises in 2016.

Navy Cargo Handling Battalions (NCHBs) are expeditionary logistics units of the United States Navy.

== History ==
The Cargo Handling Battalions trace their lineage to U.S. Navy's first "Combat Stevedores" - the 41 "Special" Naval Construction Battalions, created during WWII.

== Warfare qualification ==
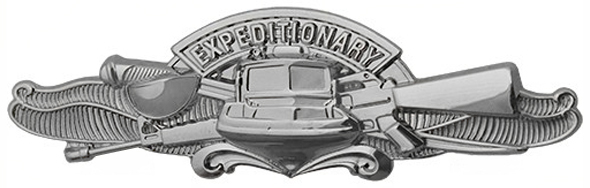
Enlisted Expeditionary Warfare Specialist insignia

Sailors assigned to NCHBs are eligible to earn designation as Enlisted Expeditionary Warfare Specialist. To do this, candidates must attend various training events over the course of several months and then demonstrate their knowledge at an oral board.

== List of Navy Cargo Handling Battalions ==
Designation	Abbreviation	Headquarters	Component	Status
ONE	NCHB-1	Cheatham Annex, Naval Weapons Station Yorktown, Virginia	Active	Active
FIVE	NCHB-5	Joint Base Lewis-McChord, Tacoma, Washington	Reserve	Active
EIGHT	NCHB-8	Lakehurst Maxfield Field, Lakehurst, New Jersey	Reserve	Decommissioned 2026
TEN	NCHB-10	Naval Weapons Station Yorktown, Virginia	Reserve	Active
ELEVEN	NCHB-11	Blount Island Command, Florida	Reserve	Active
THIRTEEN	NCHB-13	CBC Gulfport, Mississippi	Reserve	Decommissioned 2025
FOURTEEN	NCHB-14	Port Hueneme, California	Reserve	Decommissioned 2026
