= Kiskiack (Lee House) =

Historic house in Virginia, United States

- U.S. National Register of Historic Places
- Virginia Landmarks Register
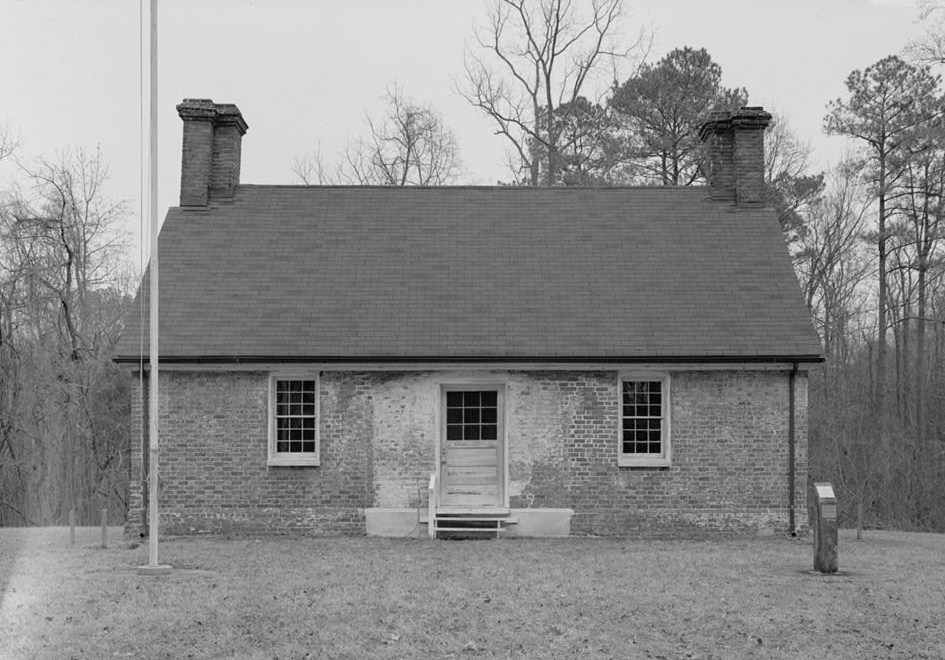
- Kiskiack, HABS Photo

- Location within Virginia Location within the United States
- Location: NE of jct. of VA 238 and 168, near Lackey, Virginia
- Coordinates: 37°14′28″N 76°33′51″W
- Area: 0 acres (0 ha)
- NRHP reference No.: 69000287
- VLR No.: 099-0012

Significant dates
- Added to NRHP: November 12, 1969
- Designated VLR: September 9, 1969

Kiskiack (Lee House) is the name of an early 17th-century brick building, originally built as a private residence, which still stands at the Naval Weapons Station Yorktown in York County, Virginia. This brick structure, the oldest building owned by the U.S. Navy, is listed on the National Register of Historic Places. It was named for the historic Kiskiack, an Algonquian-speaking tribe of the Powhatan Confederacy, who occupied this area at the time of English colonization.

It is one-and-a-half stories, built with a gable roof at a relatively steep pitch of 55 degrees. All four walls were laid in Flemish bond, with English bond below the glazed water table. It has a central passage plan and the entrance facade on the west is symmetrical, with a central doorway. Due to a fire in 1915, much of the interior was destroyed but the house is structurally preserved.

The house was built on property acquired in 1641 English immigrant colonist Dr. Henry Harry Lee, who added to his property in 1650 and 1653. He served as a justice of the court of York County in 1646 and was elected to the House of Burgesses in 1656. There is no genealogical evidence connecting him to ancestors of the family of Robert E. Lee. He married Marah Adkins Fulgate. (Lee's descendants spelled the name of the property as "Kiskiak.") Marah's father was the minister who officiated at the 17th-century marriage of Pocahontas, the Powhatan's daughter, and English colonist John Rolfe.

It is not known if Lee or one of his descendants built the house; it is in the style of the late 17th century and could have been built by his son or grandson. It is described as "a rare survival of a typical early Virginia country house. The quality of both its design and construction is a testament to the high standards of craftsmanship attained by Virginians during the first century of settlement." The T-shaped chimney stacks were assessed as the most significant architectural feature of the house. A small Lee family cemetery is nearby.

The Lee family owned the property until 1918, when it and adjoining lands were acquired by the federal government for the Naval Mine Depot. This installation what ultimately developed as Naval Weapons Station Yorktown and is off-limits to the general public.

Years later, Barbara Blunt Brooks of Richmond, Virginia donated one of Dr. Lee's hand-crafted tables to the Naval Weapons Museum. This table is one of two identical tables known to have been made by Lee; the location of the other is unknown.

The house was photographed and measured for the Historic American Buildings Survey. It is listed on the National Register of Historic Places and the Virginia Landmarks Register.Register]].
