= Commander, Navy Expeditionary Forces =

Echelon III command of the U.S. Navy

- The seal of the U.S. Navy Expeditionary Combat Command.
- Active: 2006 – present
- Country: United States of America
- Branch: United States Navy
- Type: Echelon III command
- Role: Expeditionary Warfare
- Size: 21,000
- Garrison/HQ: Joint Expeditionary Base Little Creek, Virginia Beach, U.S.
- Engagements: Global War on Terrorism: Operation Enduring Freedom; War in Afghanistan; Iraq War

Commanders
- Current commander: RADM Bradley J. Andros, USN

The Commander, Navy Expeditionary Forces (CNEF) formerly the Navy Expeditionary Combat Command (NECC), is an echelon III command of the United States Navy, which serves as the single functional command to centrally manage current and future readiness, resources, manning, training and equipping of the United States Navy's 21,000 expeditionary forces who are currently serving in every theater of operation. The Navy Expeditionary Combat Command (NECC) was established in January 2006. NECC is a subordinate command of the Navy's Fleet Forces Command. On 1 October 2026, the Chief of Naval Operations officially announced the name change of the command.

NECC components offer functions such as command and control of expeditionary warfare operations, training, maritime and port security, logistics support, construction, littoral and coastal warfare and patrol, coastal riverine warfare, explosive ordnance disposal (EOD), expeditionary diving and combat salvage, and combat photography.

== Purpose ==
CNEF aligns disparate expeditionary capabilities to coordinate expeditionary practices, procedures and requirements in the joint battlespace. CNEF integrates all warfighting requirements for expeditionary combat and combat support elements, consolidating and realigning the Navy's expeditionary forces under a single command to improve fleet readiness. NECC's goal is to improve efficiencies and effectiveness through economies of scale.

CNEF changed how the U.S. Navy organizes, trains and equips its forces to meet the maritime security operations and joint contingency operations requirements. CNEF is not a stand-alone or combat force, but rather a protection force that fills the gaps in the joint warfare arena and complements capabilities of foreign military partners. As an asset to operational commanders, CNEF is designed to provide an array of capabilities that are unique to the expeditionary maritime environment as opposed to the blue water and land warfare environments.

CNEF operates alongside the other services and coalition partners to provide cooperative assistance as requested. This reallocation of support places naval forces where they are needed the most and establishes new capabilities in support of Maritime Security Operations.

== Individual training and qualifications ==
Members of most CNEF Commands are generally expected to seek qualification for the Enlisted Expeditionary Warfare Specialist Insignia. Unless they belong to specialized communities and training which require them to qualify for their respective badge such as Seabee Combat Warfare Badge, Navy Diving Badge or Navy Explosive Ordnance Disposal Badge.

== Component commands of the CNEF ==
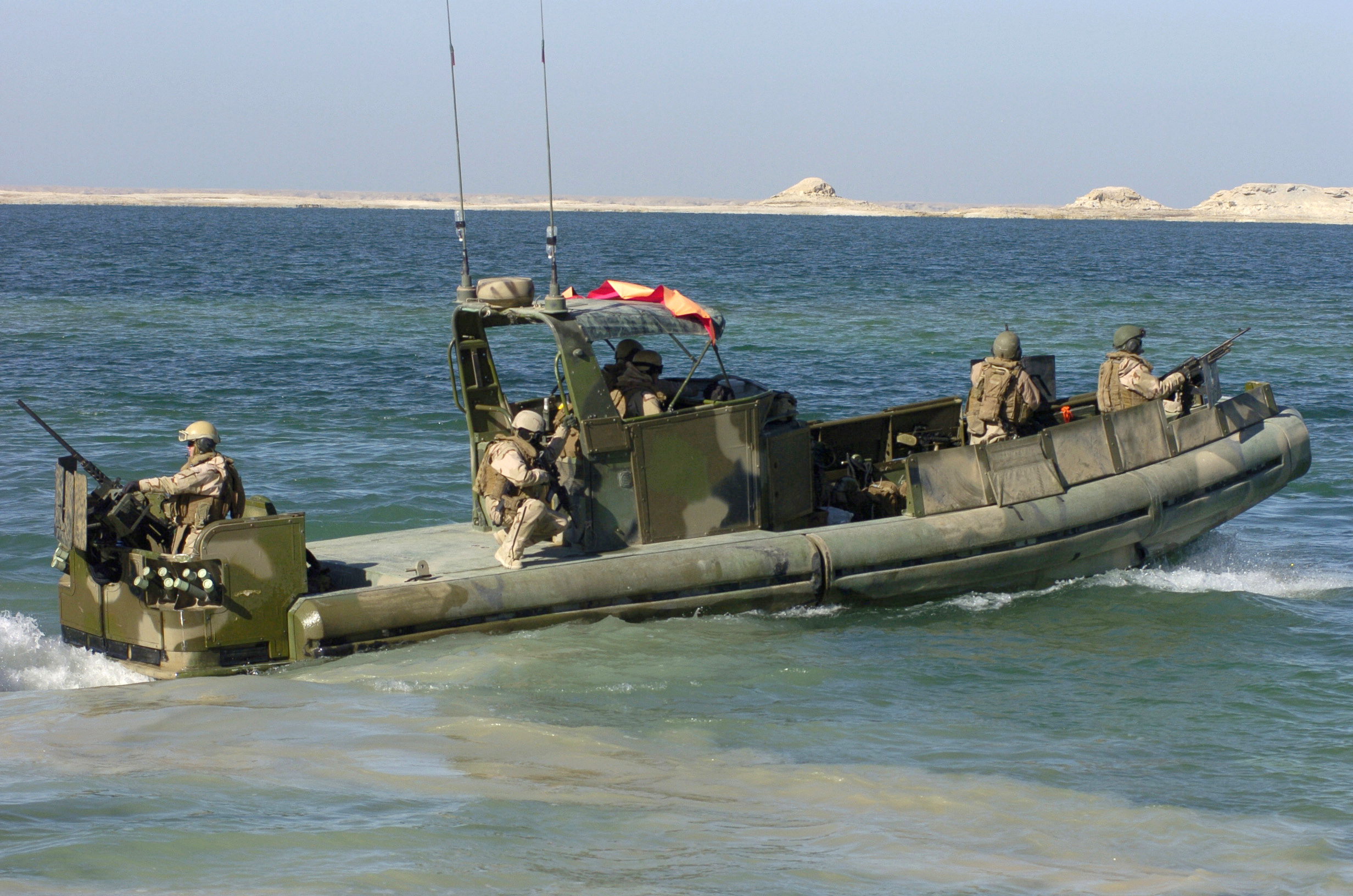
Sailors of US Navy Riverine Squadron 2 patrol waters near Haditha Dam, Anbar Province, Iraq

The CNEF's component commands included in January 2007:

- Naval Construction Forces (NCF) or "Seabees"
- Explosive Ordnance Disposal Group (EOD)
- Maritime Expeditionary Security Force (MESF)
- Expeditionary Combat Camera, Norfolk (COMCAM)
- Navy Expeditionary Intelligence Command (NEIC) provides tactical force protection/indications and warning intelligence collection, enabling Navy commanders to conduct missions across the full spectrum of expeditionary operations.
- Navy Expeditionary Logistics Support Group
- Mobile Diving and Salvage Units
- Expeditionary Warfighting Development Center (EXWDC) prepares expeditionary warriors for a wide array of missions from major combat operations to Defense Support to Civil Authorities.

On the 2007 "Navy Times" list of component commands was Maritime Civil Affairs. In May 2014 the Navy disestablished its only civil affairs formation, the Maritime Civil Affairs and Security Training Command (MCAST). McFate, writing in 2020, argued that the disestablishment of MCAST illustrated the Navy's relative prioritisation of partnerships and partnership building as opposed to combat capability.

== NECC in war on terrorism ==
The United States Navy Riverine Squadrons of the United States Navy are elements of the NECC that have taken active part in the land operations in support of the Army and USMC units. According to the Navy: "The Navy's Riverine force focuses on conducting Maritime Security Operations and Theater Security Cooperation in a riverine area of operations or other suitable area. The force is capable of combating enemy riverine forces by applying fires directly, or by coordinating supporting fires. It will share battle space with the other Services in an effort to close the seams in Doctrine, Tactics, Techniques, and Procedures, and Command, Control, Communications, Computers, Intelligence, Surveillance and Reconnaissance."

As of 2008, three riverine squadrons are active in the Navy, all under the command of Riverine Group 1, located in Norfolk, Virginia. Riverine Squadron 1 (RIVRON 1) deployed to Iraq in April 2007 and was relieved by Riverine Squadron 2 (RIVRON 2) in October 2007. Riverine Squadron 3 (RIVRON 3) was established in July 2007 and will presumably relieve RIVRON 2 in Iraq when their deployment is completed.

== Other forces that CNEF supports ==
Amphibious Warfare: transporting, ship-to-shore and across the beach, personnel, weapons, equipment, and cargo of the assault elements of the Marine Air-Ground Task Force.

- Naval Beach Group One
  - Assault Craft Unit 1, over the horizon amphibious assaults
  - Assault Craft Unit 2, over the horizon amphibious assaults.
  - Naval Beach Unit Seven, various amphibious assault capabilities

Amphibious Naval beach units:

- Beachmaster Unit One
- Beachmaster Unit Two

LCAC Units:

- Assault Craft Unit 4
- Assault Craft Unit 5

Naval Special Warfare entities:

- Naval Special Clearance Team (NSCT) consisting of SEALs, SWCC, Divers, and EOD.

Conventional United States Marine Corps and US Navy entities:

- Fleet Marine Force (FMF), a component maritime military force that provides expeditionary and amphibious warfare (ship-to-shore beach landings), supported by appropriate U.S. Navy operational forces. Subordinate commands of the FMF, comprising the Marine Expeditionary Forces (MEF)—and its subordinate Marine Expeditionary Units (MEU)—are responsible in conflicts pertaining to littoral zones, and their adjacent areas (green-water naval support); the MEFs no longer provide conventional riverine missions (brown-water naval support), as it handed this function on to NECC.

United States Coast Guard entities:

- Deployable Specialized Forces, various units within Deployable Specialized forces can be sent under NECC Command or augment the forces.
  - Port Security Unit, PSU’s are the Reserve element under Maritime Expeditionary Security Forces (MESFs), Within the Navy Expeditionary Combat Command structure. These Coast Guard units are part of an interoperable force and are part of the Department of Defense international and domestic security. They provide anti-terrorism / force protection / security for forward deployed base camps and ports around the world where needed.

== See also ==
- Deployable Operations Group, the U.S. Coast Guard equivalent of the NECC. Many Coastguardsmen are also attached to NECC.
