= Navy Expeditionary Logistics Support Group =

Echelon IV component of the U.S. Navy

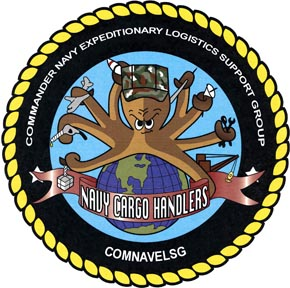
- Active: 1993 – present
- Allegiance: United States of America
- Branch: United States Navy
- Type: Navy Expeditionary Combat Force
- Role: Rapid response logistics
- Size: 2,900
- Garrison/HQ: Naval Weapons Station Yorktown, Cheatham Annex
- Nickname: "Combat Stevedores"
- Motto: Keep The Hook Moving
- Mascot: Octopus

Commanders
- Commander, NAVELSG: RDML Dennis Collins

The Navy Expeditionary Logistics Support Group (NAVELSG) is a United States Navy echelon IV component of Navy Expeditionary Combat Command, delivering logistics capabilities with active and mobilization-ready Reserve Force personnel and equipment to theater commanders.

== Mission ==
Navy Expeditionary Logistics Support Group (NAVELSG) is an enabler of Maritime Prepositioning Forces (MPF), Joint Logistics Over-the-Shore (JLOTS) operations, and maritime forces ashore, providing expeditionary cargo handling services for surface, air, and terminal operations, tactical fueling, and ordnance handling/reporting in support of worldwide Naval, Joint, inter-agency, and combined forces/organization.

NAVELSG is responsible for providing expeditionary logistic capabilities for the Navy, primarily within the maritime domain of the littorals, and conducts surface and air cargo handling missions, cargo terminal and warehouse operations, fuels distribution, postal services, customs inspections, ordnance reporting and handling, and expeditionary communications.

NAVELSG is an "Operational Reserve" command organized and staffed to provide a wide range of supply and transportation support critical for peacetime support, crisis response, humanitarian and combat service support missions.

== History ==
=== WWII and Establishment of "Special Naval Construction Battalions" ===
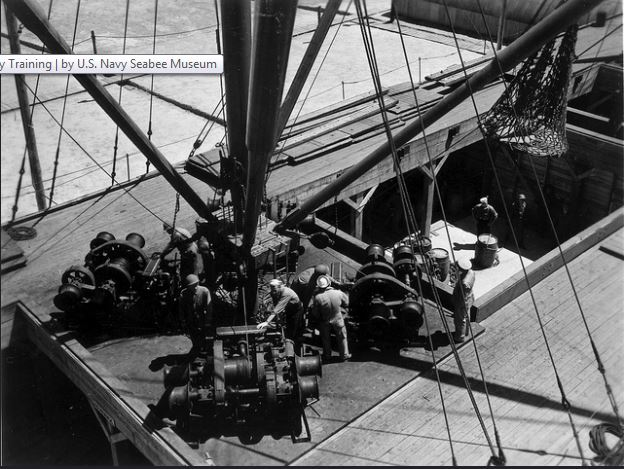
Stevedore training at the Seabee's training center Camp Allen, VA in 1943.

The U.S. Navy's first "Combat Stevedores" were the 41 "Special" Naval Construction Battalions, created during WWII. Their primary function was stevedoring in active theaters of war. The men received the standard mix of Navy/Marine Corps training that Seabees received, after which they went through stevedore schools with complete mock ships built on dry land at the Seabee training centers. 15 of the original battalions were segregated units; by 1945 they were among the Navy's first integrated units. The downsizing at the end of the war brought about the decommissioning of all 41 battalions.

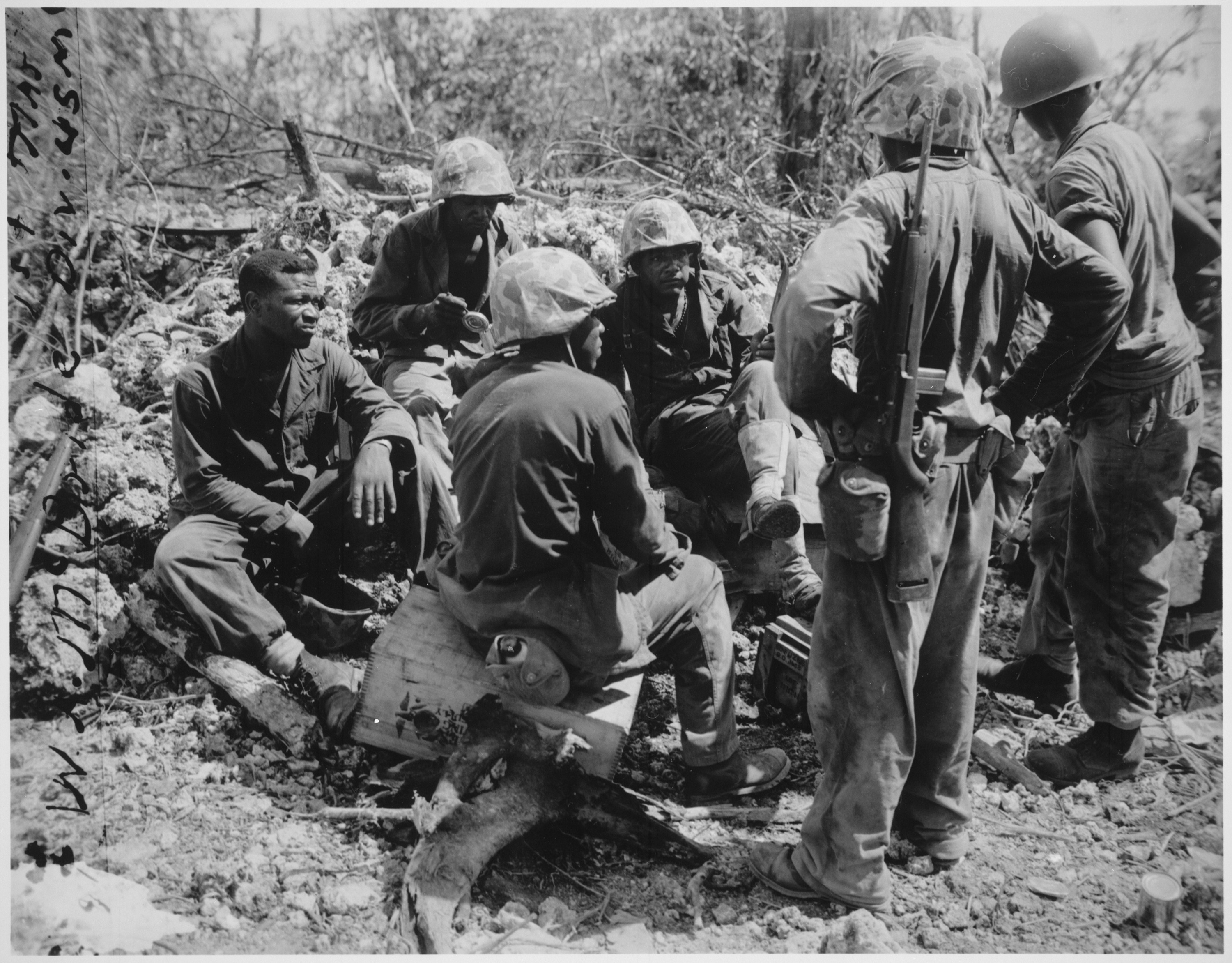
"17th Special" Seabees with the 7th Marines on Peleliu made national news in an official U.S. Navy press release.

The Special Battalions saw combat in the Pacific War. Of note were the actions of the 17th Special (segregated) at Peleliu 15-18 Sept 1944. The Japanese mounted a counter-attack 0200 D-day nite. By the time it was over, nearly the entire 17th had volunteered to carry ammunition to the front lines, bring wounded back, fill where needed on the line and man weapons which had lost their crews. The 17th Special remained with the 7th Marines until the right flank had been secured D-plus3.

=== Re-establishment and Cold War ===
Navy Cargo Handling Battalion ONE (NCHB 1) was commissioned 1 October 1949 and was organized after the Special Construction Battalions of World War II. In 1956 the battalion was an element of Operation Deep Freeze and has deployed to Antarctica numerous times in the years since.

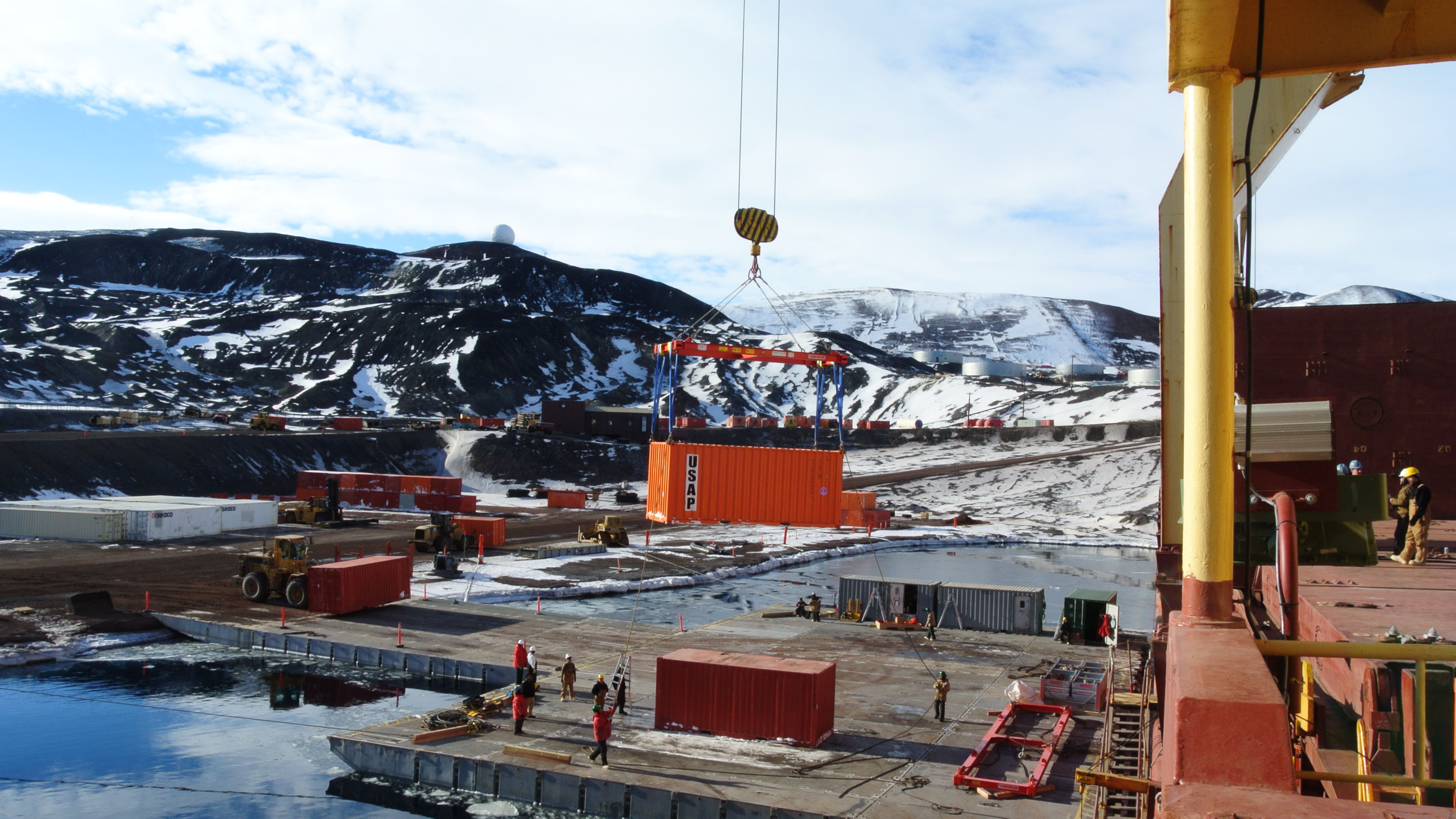
Sailors from NCHB-1 and NCHB-10 move cargo as part of the annual resupply mission at McMurdo Station, Antarctica to support Operation Deep Freeze 2012. The National Science Foundation relies on the Navy cargo handlers from Navy Expeditionary Logistics Support Group to ensure delivery of supplies to both McMurdo and South Pole Stations.

In 1965, the Cargo Handling Battalions were deployed to augment Task Group 76.4 in the discharge of ships' cargo for I Corps (South Vietnam) of the III Marine Amphibious Force".

=== Post-Cold War ===
NCHB-1 in Iraq. NCHB-1 is currently the only active duty NCHB.

More recently, the lessons learned from Operation Desert Storm identified a requirement for a single, multi-functional organization able to provide flexible, deployable transportation and supply support logistics services in any area of the world. Established in 1993, the Naval Expeditionary Logistics Support Group (NAVELSG) was built upon the foundation of the Navy Cargo Handling Force (NCHF). The NCHF originated in the 1970s with the establishment of six Reserve Navy Cargo Handling Battalions to support the Marine Corps Maritime Prepositioning Force. The number of battalions grew to 12 in the 1980s.

NCHBs deployed to Afghanistan and Iraq during the war on terror.

=== Current ===
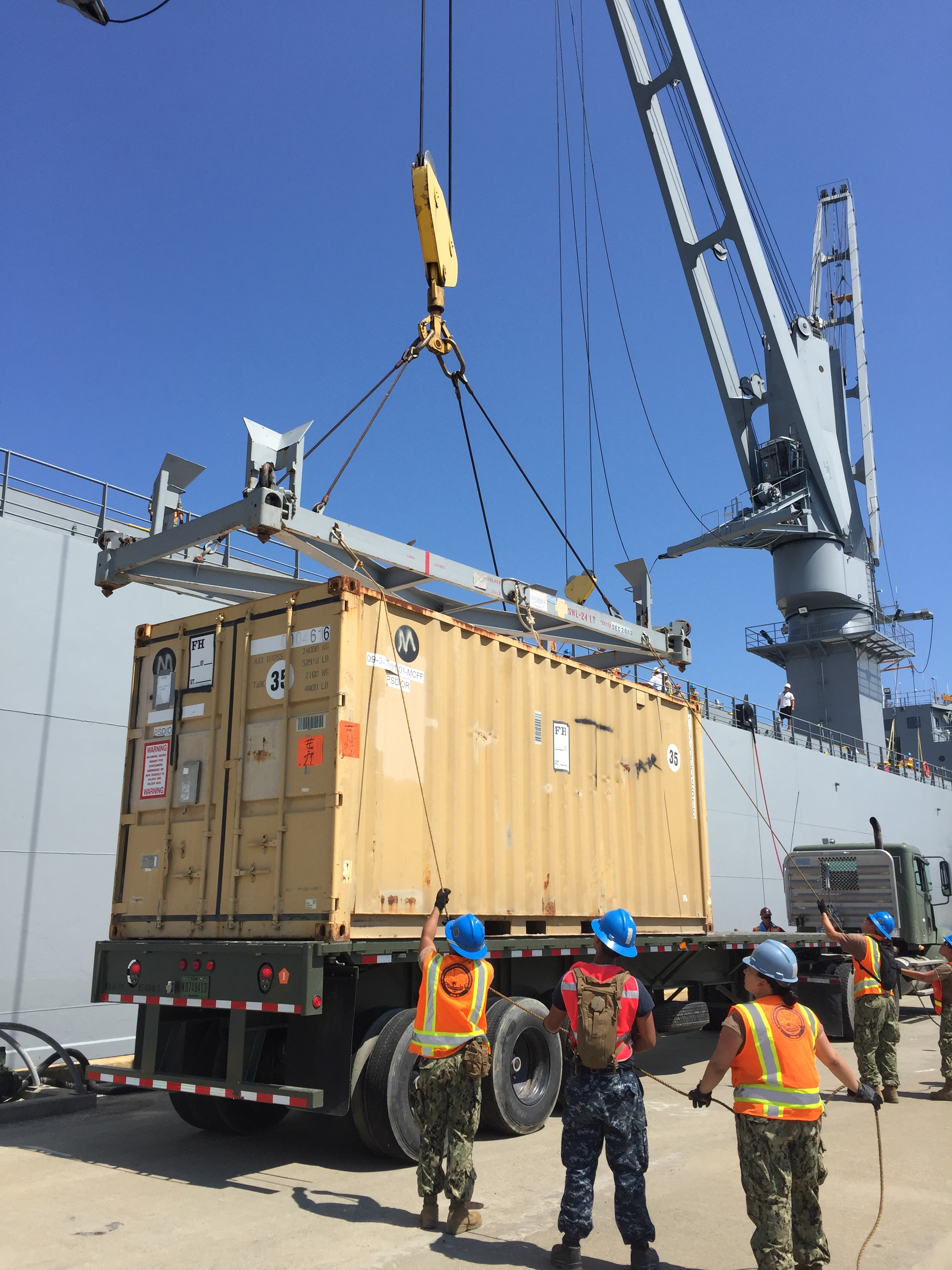
NCHB-14 personnel engaging in pre-deployment training exercises in 2016.

NCHBs deploy on a rotational basis around the world in support of national strategic objectives.

Sailors assigned to units of the Navy Expeditionary Logistics Group are eligible to earn designation as Enlisted Expeditionary Warfare Specialist after several months of training and an oral board.

== Subordinate Units ==
NAVELSG (Echelon IV), directs four Navy Expeditionary Logistics Regiments (NELR) (Echelon V) and their subordinate Navy Cargo Handling Battalions (NCHBs)(Echelon VI). Additionally, each NELR has an Expeditionary Communications Detachment (ECD).

- Navy Expeditionary Logistics Support Group Forward (NAVELSG FWD), NSA Bahrain
- First Navy Expeditionary Logistics Regiment (1ST NELR), Naval Weapons Station Yorktown, Cheatham Annex
  - NCHB 1: Cheatham Annex, Naval Weapons Station Yorktown, Virginia.
  - ECD 1: Joint Base Andrews, Maryland
- Second Navy Expeditionary Logistics Regiment (2ND NELR), Cheatham Annex
  - NCHB 8: Lakehurst Maxfield Field, Lakehurst, New Jersey
  - NCHB 10: Yorktown Naval Weapons Station, Yorktown, Virginia
  - ECD 2: Cheatham Annex, Williamsburg, Virginia
- Fourth Navy Expeditionary Logistics Regiment (4TH NELR), NAS Jacksonville, Florida
  - NCHB 11: NAS Jacksonville, Florida
  - NCHB 13: CBC Gulfport, Mississippi
- Fifth Navy Expeditionary Logistics Regiment (5TH NELR), Point Mugu, California
  - NCHB 5: Joint Base Lewis-McChord, Tacoma, WA
  - NCHB 14: Port Hueneme, California
  - ECD 5: Naval Air Station North Island, Coronado, California
