= Kiskiack =

Native group

Total population
- 40–50 warriors (150–200 people) (not state recognized)

Regions with significant populations
- Virginia Peninsula
- defunct as tribe

Languages
- Kiskiack

Religion
- Native (indigenous)

Related ethnic groups
- Pamunkey, Chickahominy, Mattaponi, Rappahannock, and other Powhatan Algonquian peoples

Kiskiack (or Chisiack or Chiskiack) was a Native American tribal group of the Powhatan Confederacy in what is present-day York County, Virginia. The name means "Wide Land" or "Broad Place" in the native language, one of the Virginia Algonquian languages. It was also the name of their village on the Virginia Peninsula.

Later English colonists adopted the name for their own village in that area. The site was later developed for the US Naval Weapons Station Yorktown in York County. The settlement was 11 miles (18 km) from Werowocomoco, the capital of the Powhatan Confederacy.

== History ==
In the mid-16th and early 17th century, the Algonquian-speaking Kiskiack tribe, part of the large Powhatan Confederacy, was located near the south bank of the York River on the Virginia Peninsula, which extended into the Chesapeake Bay. The present-day city of Yorktown developed a few miles east of here. The Kiskiack had built permanent villages, made up of numerous long-houses or yihakans, in which related families would live. The longhouses had both private and communal spaces.

The Kiskiack were one of the original four tribes of the Powhatan Confederacy, which by the early 17th century included 30 tributary tribes. Beginning with the arrival of the English colonists at Jamestown in 1607, the Kiskiack was generally one of the most hostile toward the English encroachments. They were reluctant to give away their goods to English parties from Jamestown who sought corn and other foodstuffs in order to survive during their first difficult years. But, the Kiskiack was one of the few tribes to be relatively friendly to the English in the First Anglo-Powhatan War.

Kiskiack was about 15 miles (24 km) from Jamestown, to the north across the Peninsula and located along the York River. This area did not receive as many English colonists as did the waterfront along the James River. In 1612, John Smith estimated the Kiskiack population included about 40–50 warriors. William Strachey recorded the name of their weroance as Ottahotin.

The Kiskiack took part in the Indian massacre of 1622 and helped kill colonists, hoping to drive away the survivors. The next year the colonists retaliated against them and other nearby tribes, killing about 200 men by giving them poison at a supposed friendly meeting. Some time before 1627, the Kiskiack left their village to migrate west; the English colonists occupied the site in 1629 and retained the name for some time.

By 1649, the Kiskiack had settled along the Piankatank River, where the English granted their weroance Ossakican (or Wassatickon) a reservation of 5,000 acres (20 km^{2}). In 1651, the Kiskiack exchanged this land for another 5,000-acre (20 km^{2}) tract farther upriver. Soon the English began to encroach on that reservation in Gloucester County as well. In 1669 the Kiskiack were recorded as having only 15 bowmen. They last appeared in historical records as participants in the 1676 Bacon's Rebellion. The remaining Kiskiack appear to have merged and intermarried with other groups, probably the Pamunkey, Chickahominy, or Rappahannock.

== English settlement and the palisade ==
At a meeting held at Jamestown on October 8, 1630, Sir John Harvey, the Governor, and his Council ordered the granting of lands in this area, noting:

"for the securing and taking in a tract of land called the forest, bordering upon the cheife residence of ye Pamunkey King, the most dangerous head of ye Indyan enemy," did "after much consultation thereof had, decree and sett down several proportions of land for such commanders, and 50 acres (200,000 m^{2}) per poll for all other persons who ye first yeare and five and 20 acres (81,000 m^{2}) who the second yeare, should adventure or be adventured to seate and inhabit on the southern side of Pamunkey River, now called York, and formerly known by the Indyan name of Chiskiack, as a reward and encouragement for their undertaking."

Under this order, colonists built houses on both sides of King's Creek. New ones were added along the south side of York River. The colony decided to fortify the area. In 1634, they erected a palisade across the Peninsula from Martin's Hundred to Kiskiack to protect the lower (eastern) area from Indian attacks. Middle Plantation, near the center of the palisade, was the first inland settlement. It was established by an Act of Assembly of the House of Burgesses in 1632. In 1699 Middle Plantation was renamed Williamsburg after being designated the capital of the Colony.

== Current uses ==
The former site of Kiskiack was developed and occupied by the U.S. Naval Weapons Station Yorktown. The original Algonquian name, often mispronounced, was the origin of the names of "Cheesecake Road" and "Cheesecake Cemetery", now part of Navy lands in this same area.

The southern end of Cheesecake Road left the federal property and crossed State Route 143 (Merrimack Trail), and the Chesapeake and Ohio Railway, connecting with U.S. Route 60 (Pocahontas Trail) near the western edge of Grove and the James City County-York County border. It was split by the construction of Interstate 64 in the late 1960s.

== See also ==
- Don Luis
- Ajacán Mission
- Kiskiack (Lee House)
