= Naval Weapons Station Yorktown =

United States Navy base in Virginia

- Yorktown, Virginia in United States

Site information
- Type: Military base
- Owner: U.S. Department of Defense
- Controlled by: United States Navy
- Open to the public: Limited
- Website: Official website

Location
- Location within Virginia
- Coordinates: 37°14′09″N 76°32′57″W
- Area: 108.5 sq mi (281 km^{2})

Site history
- Built: 1918
- In use: 1918–present

Garrison information
- Current commander: Captain Dan Patrick
- Occupants: Navy Munitions Command Atlantic; Naval Ophthalmic Support and Training Activity; Marine Corps Security Force Regiment; Riverine Squadron THREE; Navy Expeditionary Logistics Support Group; NAVSUP Fleet Logistics Center Norfolk detachment; Naval Expeditionary Medical Support Command; Navy Cargo Handling Battalion One; Navy Mine Depot; Maritime Civil Affairs Squadron TWO

Naval Weapons Station Yorktown is a United States Navy base in York County, James City County, and Newport News in the Hampton Roads region of Virginia. It provided a weapons and ammunition storage and loading facility for ships of the United States Atlantic Fleet, and more recently, for those from the Fleet Forces Command.

== Location ==
The Naval Weapons Station (NWS) Complex (including Cheatham Annex) is 108.5 sq mi (281 km^{2}) in area, roughly 1/5 of the total land area of York County, in which most of it lies; a small portion is within James City County.

The station is bounded on the northwest by the Naval Supply Center Cheatham Annex, the Virginia Emergency Fuel Farm, and land owned by the Department of the Interior; on the northeast by almost 14 miles (23 km) of the York River and Colonial National Historical Park; on the southwest by Route 143 and I-64; and on the southeast by Route 238 and the community of Lackey.

The station borders the cities of Newport News and Williamsburg. It shares almost 14 miles (23 km) of the York River shoreline (about half of York County's York River shoreline and wetlands) with the National Park Service.

The large Camp Peary, which also has much York River frontage on the northern side of the Virginia Peninsula, is adjacent to the Naval Station.

== History ==
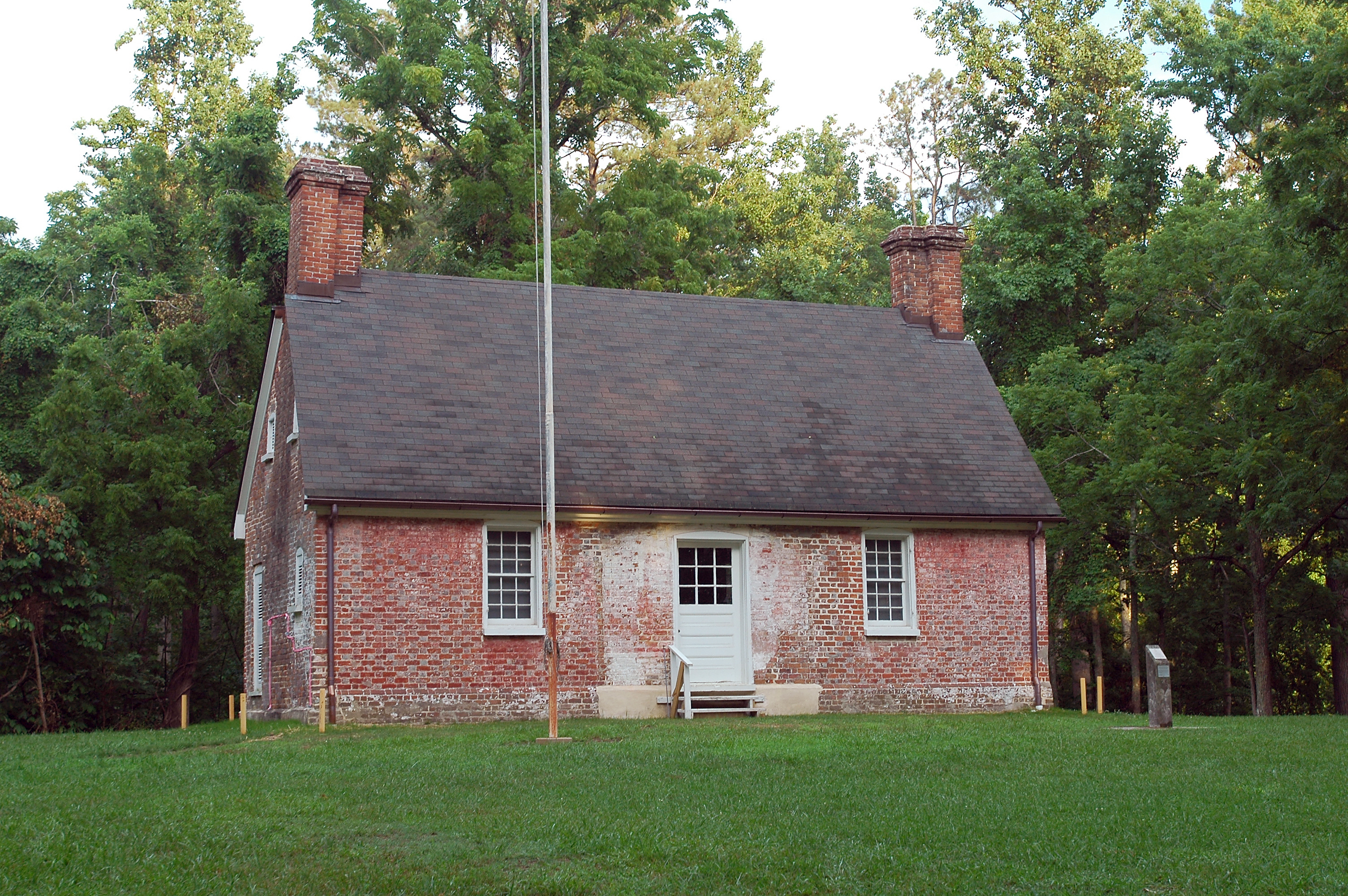
Kiskiack (Lee House), the only original country house still standing on Naval Weapons Station Yorktown

The site of NWS Yorktown is rich in colonial era (1607–1776) history, as well as that of the American Civil War (1861–1865). The station is located on the York River, in an area that was an early settlement of English colonists in Virginia. They displaced the Algonquian-speaking Kiskiack and other American Indian tribes of the Powhatan Confederacy, who historically inhabited the area. The colonial infantry of the American Revolutionary War and forces of the Civil War slogged along the Old Williamsburg Road that today runs through the station.

=== Kiskiack (Lee House) ===
The oldest structure at the Yorktown Naval Weapons Station is the brick "Kiskiack (Lee House)", built as a private residence in the late 17th century by English immigrant Henry Lee or his near descendants. At that time, the owner of the farm likely cultivated tobacco for export. It is listed on the National Register of Historic Places and the Virginia Landmarks Register. Descendants of the Lee family owned the property until its acquisition in 1918 by the federal government for the Navy Mine Depot.

=== Bellfield / E.D. Plantation ===
Naval Weapons Station Yorktown is also the location of most of the historic Bellfield Plantation (E.D. Plantation) land, located on the east side of Felgate's Creek. The land was originally granted in 1630 to John West (governor) and held through from 1650 till 1769 by decedents of Edward Digges. Bellfield continued as an agricultural operation until August 7, 1918 when the Navy purchased the land to establish the mine depot.

=== 20th Century ===
Around 1914, the DuPont Company acquired a 4,000-acre (16 km^{2}) site on the banks of the York River and built a dynamite plant, which came to be known as Penniman. Before DuPont production started, the Navy acquired the site in August 1918 by presidential proclamation in response to the outbreak of World War I in Europe. This eventually developed as the largest naval installation in the world.

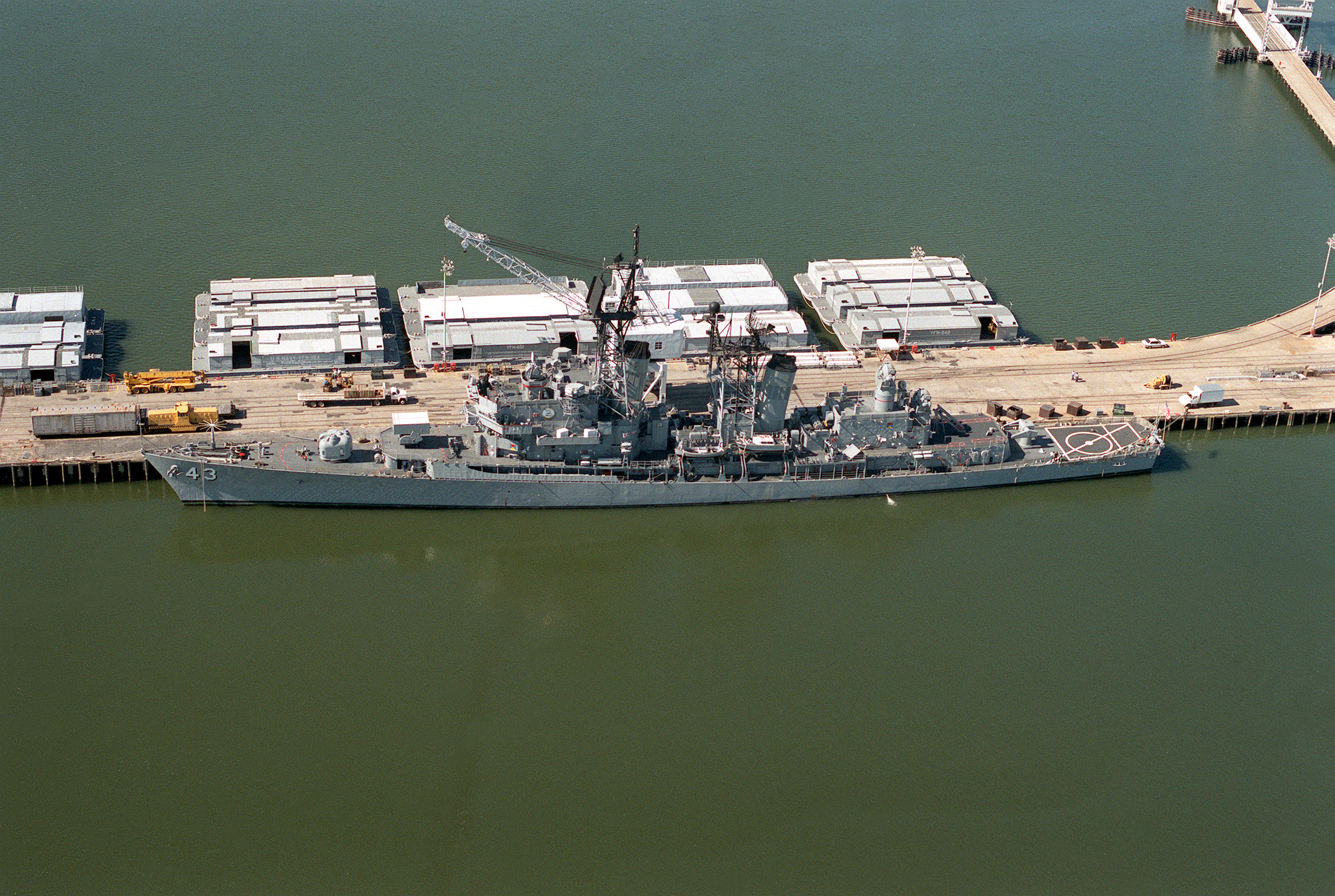
USS Dahlgren at Naval Weapons Station Yorktown in 1990

The Navy acquired the property to establish the Navy Mine Depot, Yorktown at this site. The Navy planned to lay the North Sea Mine Barrage to protect commercial shipping and required an Atlantic Seaboard plant to support the effort. Here the mines would be stored, assembled, loaded, tested and issued to the Service. A related station was required for the training of personnel to adjust and operate the mines. The Navy selected the DuPont site, about 18 square miles (47 km^{2}) of area near Yorktown, Virginia, as the best location on the East Coast for its mine activities. The Bureau of Ordnance of the Navy Department assumed possession one month later.

Yorktown was near the Navy Operating Base at Hampton Roads, the Norfolk Navy Yard, and the Fuel Bases of the Fifth Naval District. It had excellent transportation access, with the main lines of the Chesapeake and Ohio Railway forming one of the boundaries of the Depot, and 5 mi (8 km) of waterfront on the navigable York River. Ocean-going vessels of largest dimension and deepest draft could navigate there.

To make way for the new Mine Depot, the government acquired by eminent domain the property of many landowners along the former Yorktown-Williamsburg Road in nearby Lackey, Virginia. Both landowners and tenants in this area were primarily African American. (Since the late 19th century, this area had been locally known as "the Reservation".) Assisted by self-educated farmer John Tack Roberts (born c.1860), many of the displaced residents of Lackey negotiated better financial compensation for their properties. Many relocated to the community of Grove in nearby James City County. Another small community, also named Lackey, was later developed along the Yorktown Road a few miles away.

As many as 10,000 personnel worked at the Naval facility during World War I. Many workers lived in the town of Penniman. After World War I and the Navy's shift away from mines, this community also vanished as workers moved away. Halstead's Point, another community of workers on the station, also declined and disappeared. It was located near the present main gate off State Route 143.

== Current use ==
Over the years, the growth and expansion of the Navy's technical requirements and responsibilities have been reflected by corresponding developments at the station to support the Atlantic Fleet and CFFC.

As part of the Navy’s Mid-Atlantic installation consolidation, Cheatham Annex, formerly an annex of the Fleet Industrial Supply Center, Norfolk, was incorporated with the station on October 1, 1998. This area of land, located in the Jamestown, Williamsburg, and Yorktown area known as the Historic Triangle of Colonial Virginia, was acquired by the Navy on June 21, 1943. Cheatham Annex includes the former site of the "lost town" of Penniman, Virginia. Importantly, in 1992, the station was added to the Environmental Protection Agency's National Priorities List due to a Hazard Ranking Score of 50. Subsequent assessments of the site and a partnership with USEPA and VDEQ have led to a continued effort to clean up environmental hazards at the site that could affect living conditions.

Naval Weapons Station Yorktown hosts 25 tenant commands which include the Navy Munitions Command, the Naval Ophthalmic Support and Training Activity, the Marine Corps Second Fleet Antiterrorism Security Team, NAVSUP Fleet Logistics Center Norfolk detachment, Navy Expeditionary Medical Support Command, Navy Expeditionary Logistics Support Group, Riverine Squadron THREE, Maritime Civil Affairs Squadron TWO, and 19 storefronts.

The station and tenant commands work together to provide ordnance logistics, technical, supply and related services to Fleet Forces Command and its ships. Today the station is a hub of activity. As one of the Navy's "explosive corridors" to the sea, supply, amphibious and combatant ships may be seen arriving and departing the station's two piers.

== See also ==
- Magruder, Virginia
- Camp Peary

== Additional reading ==
- McCartney, Martha W. (1977) James City County: Keystone of the Commonwealth; James City County, Virginia; Donning and Company; ISBN 0-89865-999-X
