= United States Navy Riverine Squadron =

US military units

The Riverine Squadrons of the United States Navy are elements of the Navy's Navy Expeditionary Combat Command (NECC). According to the Navy: “The Navy’s Riverine force focuses on conducting Maritime Security Operations and Theater Security Cooperation in a riverine area of operations or other suitable area. The force is capable of combating enemy riverine forces by direct fire, or by coordinating supporting fire. It will share battle space with the other Services in an effort to close the seams in Doctrine, Tactics, Techniques, and Procedures, and Command, Control, Communications, Computers, Intelligence, Surveillance and Reconnaissance.”

== Background ==
Riverine warfare has a long history in the US Navy, dating back to the Revolutionary War, when American sailors in row galleys engaged the formidable warships of the British operating in colonial waterways. Modern American riverine warfare came of age during the Vietnam War, as patrol boats and river assault craft combed the Mekong Delta and other vital waterways. Navy Riverine units conduct brown water operations on inland waters such as rivers and lakes and can also conduct green water littoral operations along the coasts. The development of a robust Navy and Army riverine warfare capability during the Vietnam War produced the forerunner to the modern special warfare combatant-craft crewman.

A US Navy Riverine Group was created in 2006 to take over riverine warfare from the USMC as the Marines needed every Marine to conduct counter insurgency ground operations during the Iraq War. The Riverine Group had a 4-month training pipeline with infantry and machine gun training provided by the USMC. Sailors attended 5 weeks of Riverine Combat Skills then 3 months of Riverine Craft Crewman, Riverine Security Team or Riverine Unit Level Leader. The Riverine Group had Riverine Craft Crewman who operated the boats and machine guns and Riverine Security Teams. Each Riverine Security Team had three riflemen with one patrol leader, one machine gunner and one grenadier. Riverines also received 1 week of combat life saver training. The Riverine Group also had designated marksman and JTAC trained sailors in the group. The JTAC course was 3 months long.

The Navy Riverine Group was changed to Coastal Riverine Force in 2012 when it was merged with the US Navy's Naval Coastal Warfare Groups. The Coastal Riverine Force was renamed to Maritime Expeditionary Security Force when the riverine capability was disbanded in 2020 as the USMC took over riverine warfare again. The responsibility of riverine warfare has been tasked to the US Navy, USMC and even the US Army at different times in US military history. The US Coast Guard under command of the US Navy has also participated in riverine warfare.

The US Navy created the Riverine Group in 2006 when the US Navy took over riverine warfare from the US Marine Corps. In 2008, three riverine squadrons were active in the Navy, all under the command of Riverine Group 1, located in Norfolk, Virginia. Riverine Squadron 1 (RIVRON 1) deployed to Iraq in April 2007 and was relieved by Riverine Squadron 2 (RIVRON 2) in October 2007. Riverine Squadron 3 (RIVRON 3) was established in July 2007 and relieved RIVRON 2 in Iraq when their deployment completed in April 2008.

The United States Navy merged its riverine forces (US Navy Riverine Group) and Naval Coastal Warfare Groups (NCWs) in 2012 to form the Coastal Riverine Force (CRF). The Coastal Riverine Force was disbanded in 2020 when riverine warfare responsibility was turned back over to the US Marine Corps. The US Navy still has the Maritime Expeditionary Security Force (MESF) to conduct coastal warfare and security operations.

== History ==
=== RIVGRU and RIVRON 1 ===
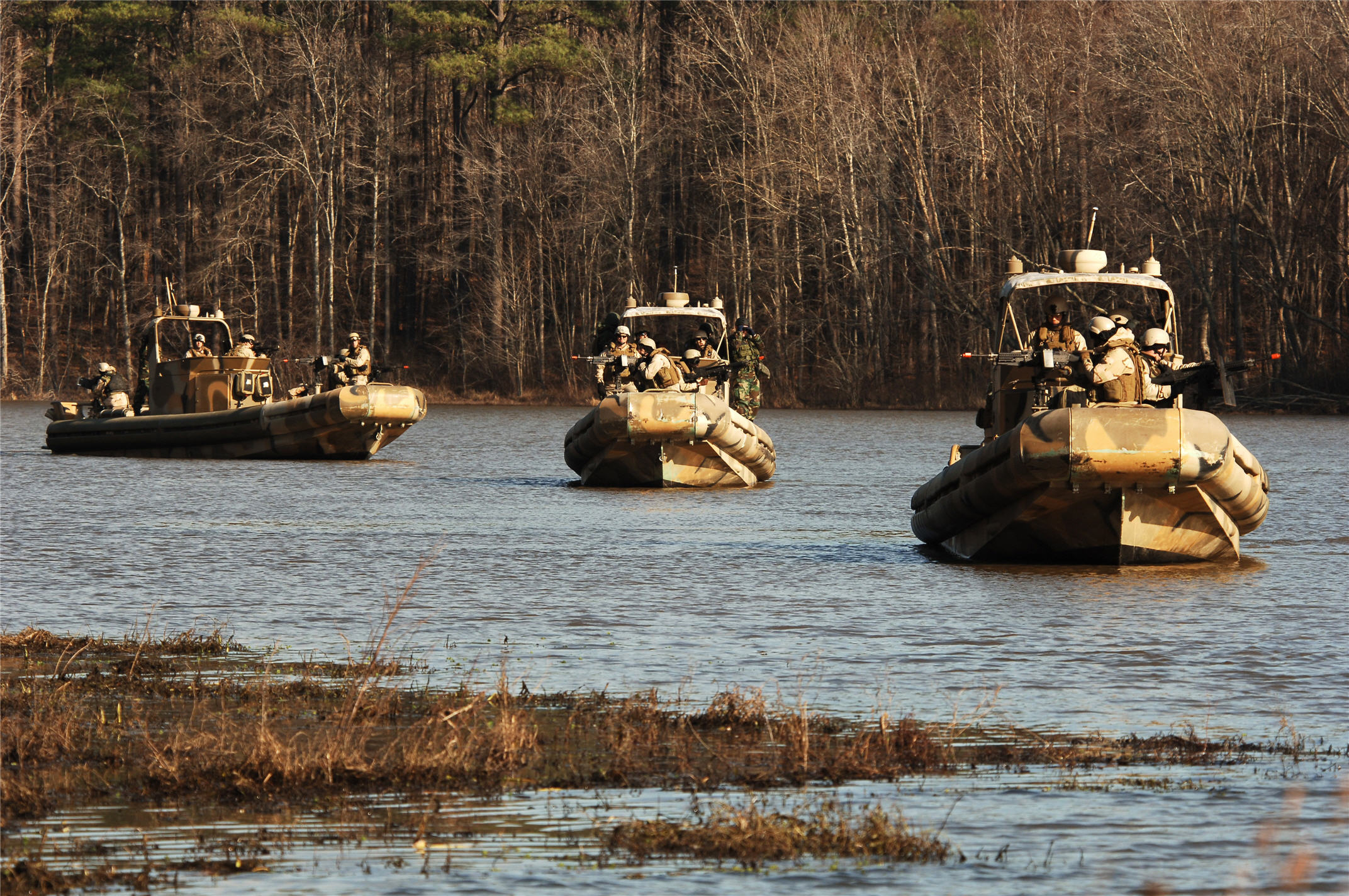
RIVRON 1 training with SURC at Ft. Pickett, Virginia

Riverine Group (RIVGRU 1) and Riverine Squadron 1 were both formally established May 25, 2006, under Navy Expeditionary Combat Command. It was modeled after the Marines Small Craft Company. The establishment brought together sailors from diverse backgrounds to begin a transformation from blue water to brown water sailors.

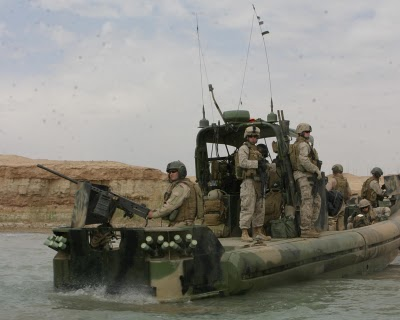
US Navy RIVERINE SQUADRON 1 along with US Marines patrol Euphrates River in Iraq

Following several months of training in combat skills, SURC operations, and cultural and language skills, RIVRON 1 Advance Party deployed to Iraq on February 13, 2007, followed by RIVRON 1 Main Body deployed March 8. RIVRON 1 conducted integrated maritime combat operations with Marines, Soldiers, Coalition Forces, Iraqi Army, and Iraqi Police. RIVRON 1 assumed patrol duties around Haditha Dam from the Marine Corps, who had previously been performing this task. On 1 August 2012, RIVRON 1 was decommissioned. It was replaced by Coastal Riverine Squadron (CORIVRON) 4, which combined RIVRON 1 with Maritime Expeditionary Security Squadron (MSRON) 4. This reorganization combined navy small boat units to provide both offensive and defensive force protection.

=== RIVRON 2 ===
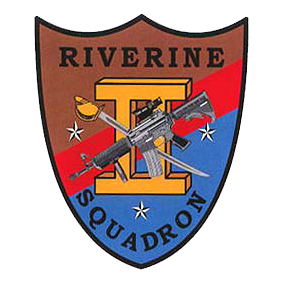
RIVRON II insignia.

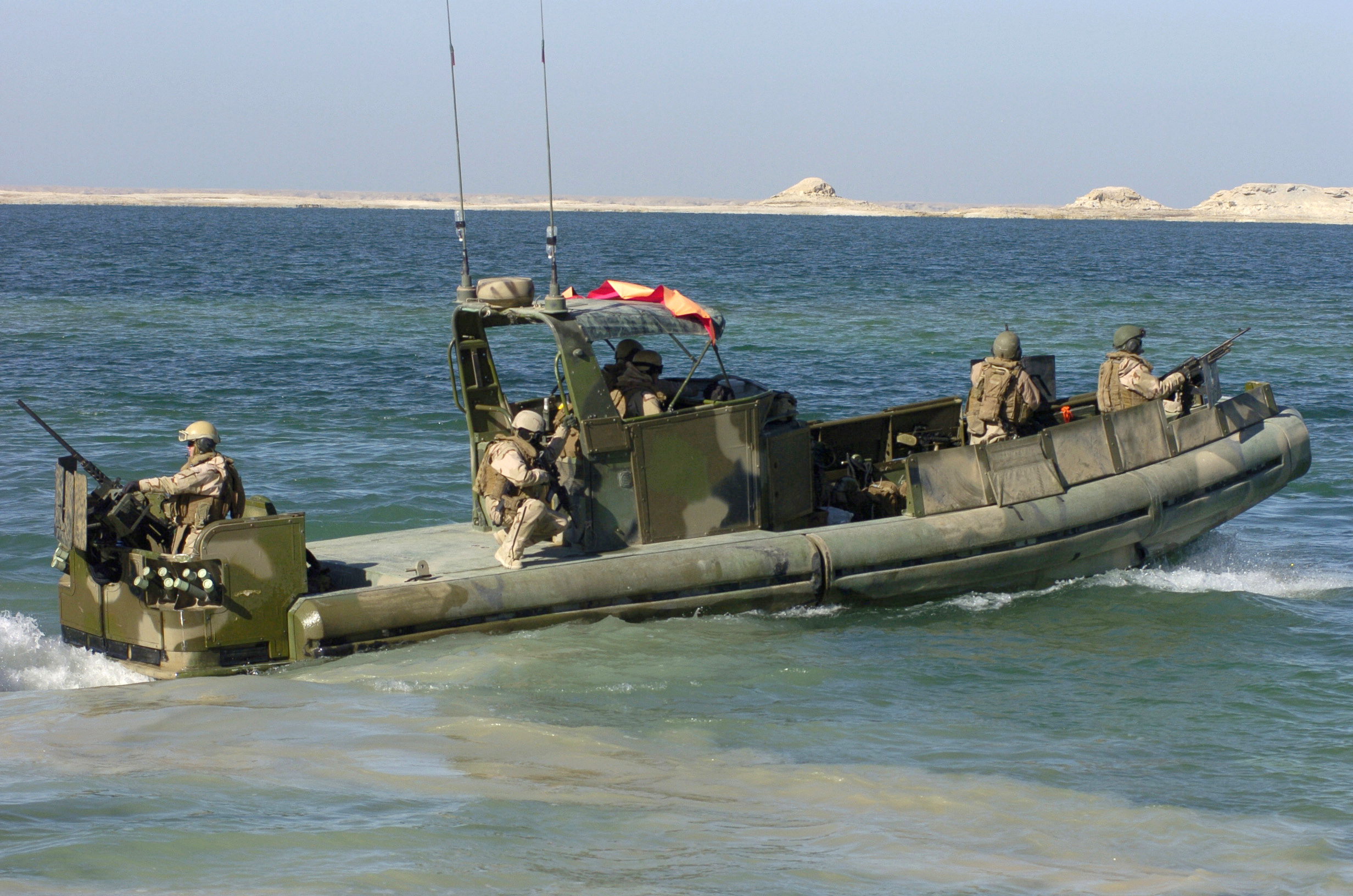
U.S. Navy Riverine Squadron 2 patrols the waters around Haditha Dam in small unit riverine craft (SURC)

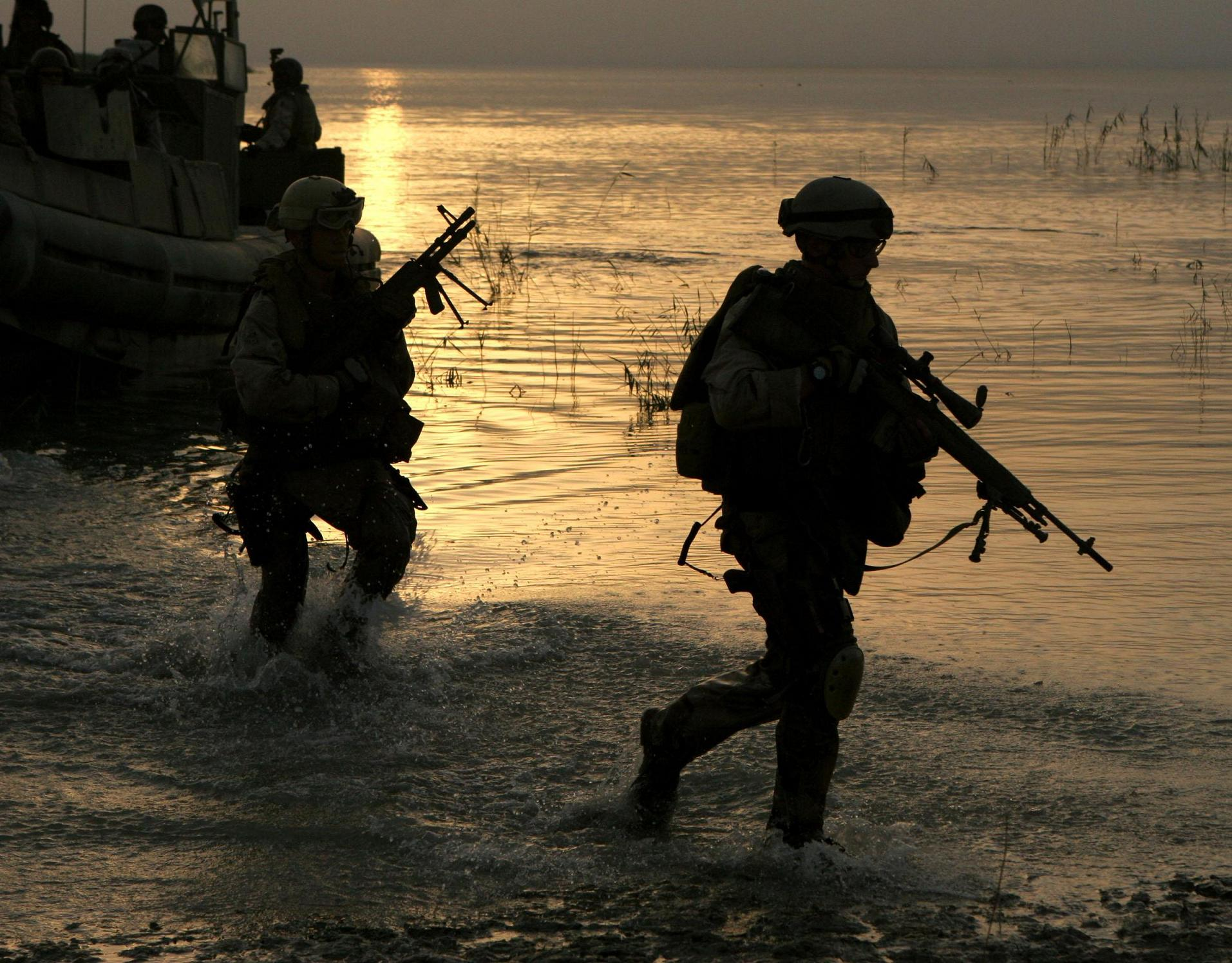
Sailors from Riverine Security Team from Riverine Squadron 1 come ashore to conduct patrols

RIVRON 2 was established on February 2, 2007, and began unit-level training with the Marine Corps at Camp Lejeune, North Carolina. RIVRON 2 deployed to Iraq in October 2007, relieving RIVRON 1.

=== RIVRON 3 ===
RIVRON 3 was established on July 6, 2007, at Naval Weapons Station Yorktown, Virginia. The unit deployed to Iraq in April 2008 relieving RIVRON 2.

== Units ==
- Riverine Group ONE (RIVGRU 1), Little Creek, Virginia
  - Riverine Squadron ONE (RIVRON 1), Little Creek, Virginia
  - Riverine Squadron TWO (RIVRON 2), Little Creek, Virginia
  - Riverine Squadron THREE (RIVRON 3), Yorktown, Virginia

== See also ==
- Special Warfare Combatant-craft Crewmen
- 2016 U.S.–Iran naval incident

== References and external links ==
- GlobalSecurity.org: “Navy getting back into the riverboat patrol business in Iraq” (from Associated Press)
- Stars and Stripes: “Navy’s revived riverine squadron to patrol dam”, 2007-03-24
- U.S. Navy Bureau of Personnel: Qualification requirements for the Riverine Force
- Navy Times: “First riverine unit deploys to Iraq”, 2007-03-09
- United States Central Command: “Navy’s riverine force plans first homecoming since Vietnam”, 2007-09-22
- U.S. Marine Corps News: “Riverines combat guerrilla tactics, enforce new curfew”, 2007-10-03
- Photos
- https://web.archive.org/web/20130301233842/http://www.public.navy.mil/necc/hq/PublishingImages/NECC%20fact%20sheets/NECC_CRF_FactSheet2012.pdf
