= Camp Allen =

Coordinates: 36°55′42″N 76°17′38″W

Camp Allen, is a small United States Marine Corps base in Norfolk, Virginia, a satellite of the Naval Station Norfolk. In 1942 the Chief of the Bureau of Yards and Docks (now NAVFAC) wanted the first Seabee training center close to an existing Naval training facility with Norfolk being chosen because of the available land that could be purchased. On 25 March 1942 the Commandant of the 5th Naval District announced that the U.S. Naval Construction Training Center, Naval Operating Base Norfolk had been commissioned 4 days prior. The base was named Camp Allen in memory of the CEC Captain Walter H. Allen founder of the naval construction regiment at Great Lakes Naval Training Center during WWI.

Camp Allen later became home to the 3rd Fleet Antiterrorism Security Team (FAST) Companies. The base had a supply warehouse, battalion aid station, and transportation area, but all have been re-purposed. All units are members of the Marine Corps Security Force Regiment, headquartered aboard Naval Weapons Station Yorktown.

== Education ==
In regards to dependents in the Camp Allen area, the facility is zoned to Norfolk Public Schools and is assigned to: Camp Allen Elementary School, Blair Middle School, and Maury High School.
