= Marine Corps Security Force Regiment =

Dedicated security and anti-terrorism regiment of the US Marine Corps

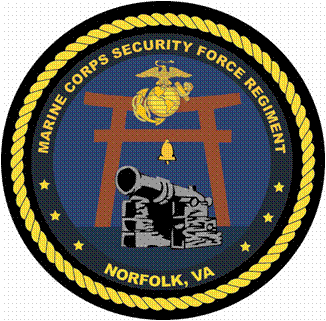
- The unit's logo
- Active: 1920–present
- Country: United States
- Allegiance: United States Armed Forces
- Branch: United States Marine Corps
- Type: Specialized unit
- Role: Anti-terrorism; Expeditionary Security
- Size: Regiment
- Garrison/HQ: Naval Weapons Station Yorktown, Virginia
- Nickname: Gunslingers
- Mottos: Deter, Detect, Defend

Commanders
- Current commander: Col Scott Reed

The Marine Corps Security Force Regiment is a dedicated expeditionary security and anti-terrorism regiment of the United States Marine Corps. Its mission is to provide security forces to guard high-value naval installations, most notably those containing nuclear vessels and weapons. Additionally, it also provides the Fleet Anti-terrorism Security Teams (FAST) and Recapture Tactics Teams (RTT). Marines who complete Security Forces training are assigned a secondary Military Occupational Specialty (MOS) of 8152 (Marine Corps Security Force Guard), while instructors can earn 8153 (Marine Corps Security Force Cadre Trainer).

== History ==
The unit was initially organized as the Marine Detachment, Naval Operation Base in 1920. It was re-designated as Marine Barracks, Norfolk in 1939. During World War II, Marines from the Norfolk Barracks provided security for several commands in the Tidewater area, including the Naval Station, Naval Air Station, and Naval Fuel Annex at Craney Island, and what is now Naval Amphibious Base Little Creek.

The Barracks also acted as the processing center for transient Marines on the East Coast. In addition to providing gate security for the Norfolk Naval Base Complex and a security force for a nearby Service Storage Facility, Barracks Marines also served as ceremonial troops and provided security at the headquarters of United States Atlantic Fleet and provided administrative support to Marines stationed in various Naval commands in Norfolk area.

The Norfolk Barracks was re-designated as Marine Corps Security Force Battalion, Atlantic, on 1 April 1987, and exercised administrative control over security force companies and detachments afloat in the Atlantic region. FAST (FMF LANT) Marines engaged with "intruders" on 14 April 1988 at the Arraijan fuel farms near Howard Air Force Base in Panama during a two hour-long firefight.

The former Marine Barracks at Mare Island Naval Shipyard, Vallejo, CA was re-designated as Marine Corps Security Force Battalion, Pacific, FMF on 3 August 1987. The battalion exercised administrative control over security force companies and detachments afloat in the Pacific region such as the former Marine Barracks Concord, Marine Barracks Bangor, Marine Barracks Hawaii, Marine Barracks North Island, and Marine Barracks Yokusuka, Japan. Originally, Commanding General, Fleet Marine Force, Pacific had direct operational command of MCSFBN, FMF, Pacific. CG FMF PAC visited the battalion at Mare Island near the end of August that year.

The Marine Corps also established FAST Company (Pacific) on 3 August 1987. FAST Marines had participated in the Shallow Hawk 1-87 Riverine Exercise led by US Navy Special Boat Unit-11 a battalion-sanctioned a month earlier in July 1987 prior to the official battalion stand-up. The company comprised five 50-man platoons and assumed responsibility for temporary security of US Navy Nuclear Submarine refueling and defueling (RF/DF) sites; reinforcement of US Navy Nuclear Weapons security facilities; security of transportation of special weapons under contingency operations; and US Navy related nuclear accident-incident (i.e. Broken Arrow and Bent Spear) site security; as well as, reinforcement of US Navy Facilities and US Embassies in the Pacific and Indian Ocean AOR. The first and second platoons were trained and commanded by former guard officers and staff NCO's from Marine Barracks Naval Weapons Station Concord, who were already qualified under Navy Technical Proficiency Inspection (NTPI) standard and had several years experience as nuclear weapons couriers.

The first operational deployment of a FAST Platoon from MCSFBN (PAC) was 1st Platoon, FAST Company (FMF PAC), on 1 September 1987 to reinforce security at Naval Weapons Station Concord. The second operational deployment of a FAST Platoon from MCSFBN (PAC) was 2nd Platoon, FAST (FMF PAC) to Naval Submarine Base Bremerton Washington in October 1987 for a nuclear fueling security (RF/DF) mission. 1st Platoon also provided RF/DF security for the decommissioning of the USS Seawolf (SSN-575) during the fall of 1987 at Mare Island Naval Shipyard. Three of the FAST platoons also participated in KENNEL LANCE BRAVO anti-terrorism exercises with and against US Navy SEALS at several CONUS Naval Bases in the San Diego and Oakland areas. The exercise was terminated with the Loma Prieta earthquake. 1st Platoon, FAST (FMF PAC) also deployed to Naval Station Hawaii during Fall 1988 on an RF/DF mission.

Although the FAST companies (FMF LANT and FMF PAC) were established in 1987 to provide a more mobile force under their respective FMF CG's, the battalions were consolidated and re-organized as Marine Corps Security Force Regiment on 16 December 1993. The new regiment assumed control of all security force companies and detachments globally. In 1998, numerous companies and detachments were deactivated due to force reductions and realignments; two FAST companies were established to take their place.

== Units ==
Active

- Headquarters Company, Naval Weapons Station Yorktown, Yorktown, Virginia
- Training Company, Naval Support Activity Hampton Roads, Northwest Annex, Chesapeake, Virginia
- Marine Corps Security Forces Battalion Bangor at Naval Base Kitsap, Bangor Trident Base, Washington
- Marine Corps Security Forces Battalion at Naval Submarine Base Kings Bay, Kings Bay, Georgia
- Company at Naval Station Guantanamo Bay, Guantanamo Bay, Cuba
- Company A, Naval Weapons Station Yorktown, Virginia
- Company B, Naval Weapons Station Yorktown, Virginia
- Company C, Naval Weapons Station Yorktown, Virginia
- FAST Company Central, Naval Support Activity Bahrain, Manama, Bahrain
- FAST Company Europe, Naval Station Rota, Rota, Spain
- FAST Company Pacific, United States Fleet Activities Yokosuka, Yokosuka, Japan

Former

- Marine Corps Security Force Regiment, Norfolk, Virginia
- Marine Corps Security Force Battalion, Pacific, Mare Island, California
- (Naval Station Mare Island California FAST Company PACIFIC)
- Naval Air Station North Island, Marine Corps Security Force, Coronado, California
- Naval Air Station Patuxent River, Lexington Park, Maryland
- Naval Air Station Keflavik, Keflavik, Iceland
- Naval Computer and Telecommunications Station Naples, Naples, Italy
  - Detachment to Naval Support Activity Suda Bay, Crete, Greece
- Naval Activities United Kingdom, London, United Kingdom
- Naval Security Group Activity Sábana Seca, Puerto Rico
- Naval Station Subic Bay, Olongapo, Philippines
- Concord Naval Weapons Station, Concord, California
- Marine Corps Security Force Company, Naval Air Station Alameda, Alameda, California
- Marine Corps Security Force Company, Naval Air Station Cecil Field, Jacksonville, Florida
- Marine Corps Security Force Company, Naval Weapons Station Earle, Colts Neck, New Jersey

== Fleet Anti-terrorism Security Team (FAST) companies ==
Fleet Anti-terrorism Security Team Companies
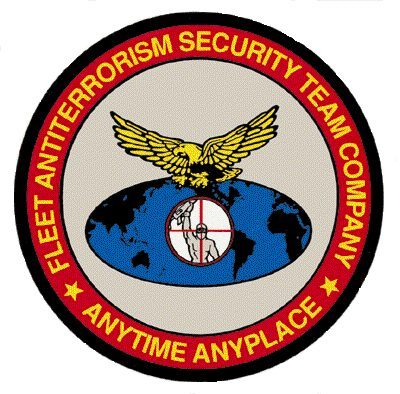
- Fleet Anti-Terrorism Security Team logo
- Active: 1987–present
- Nickname: "FAST Company"
- Mottos: Anytime, Anyplace
- Engagements: USS Cole bombing, Operation Just Cause, Operation Desert Shield, Operation Desert Storm, American Embassy bombings in Kenya and Tanzania, Iraq War, Afghan War, Haitian crisis

The Fleet Anti-terrorism Security Team (FAST) platoons are an elite unit of the United States Marine Corps that is capable of rapidly deploying to immediately improve security at United States Government installations worldwide, and are also capable of deploying as an infantry quick reaction force. Additionally, the unit provides High Threat Protection to high ranking officials and diplomats in austere environments.

Established in 1987, FAST companies provide a limited-duration, expeditionary security force to protect vital naval and national assets and personnel. FAST maintains forward-deployed platoons at various naval commands around the globe, and possesses US-based alert forces capable of rapidly responding to unforeseen contingencies worldwide. Each FAST company is equipped and trains with some of the most state-of-the-art weaponry and currently consists of around 500 marines.

FAST companies maintain a high degree of readiness in order to conduct these short-notice, limited-duration contingency operations. The USMC's FAST companies provide both the US Navy and Marine Corps with a dedicated force protection and anti-terrorist unit.

=== History ===
The late 1970s and early 1980s were a high water mark for US military anti-terrorist efforts. A series of deadly attacks directed at Americans highlighted the requirement for security forces capable of countering terrorist threats against military units.

The President issued a directive ordering US security agencies and all branches of the military to enhance their capabilities in this field. In compliance with this directive, the USMC conducted a thorough evaluation of its security forces during the mid-eighties. Upon the study's completion, the Corps came to the conclusion that its current security procedures were inadequate to handle the security threats being posed against it. The Corps decided to form a new unit of highly trained elite Marines dedicated to defending both US Navy and Marine Corps assets from terrorist attack.

The new unit was designated as the Fleet Anti-terrorism Security Team, or FAST. Established in 1987, FAST Companies are equipped to perform security missions as directed by the Chief of Naval Operations. FAST Company marines augment installation security when a threat condition is elevated beyond the ability of resident and auxiliary security forces. They are not designed to provide a permanent security force for the installation. The Marine Corps uses FAST Companies to protect forces when a threat level requires it. Other missions include infantry duties, Close Protection, and occasionally augmenting part of Maritime Raid Forces aboard Marine Expeditionary Units (MEU).

Each company is well grounded in basic infantry skills. FAST Companies are primarily designed to conduct defensive combat operations, military security operations, and infantry operations. They also can be tailored for specific tasks from the Chief of Naval Operations. They also ensure nuclear material on submarines is not compromised when the vessels are docked.

- Dedicated, armed, combat-trained cadre
- Task organized and equipped to perform security and combat operations of short duration
- Augment installation security when the threat condition has been elevated beyond the capability of the permanent security force
- Conduct anti-terrorism missions out of threatened installations.
- Train, advise, and assist host nation security forces in anti-terrorism and weapons marksmanship.
- Assist the base security officer and DSS Agents in the preparation of base defense and other security operation planning.
- Conduct PSD (Personnel Security Detachment) missions for diplomats, high ranking officials, and other at risk national assets.
- Requested by combatant and fleet commanders-in-chief
- Deploy only upon approval of the Chief of Naval Operations

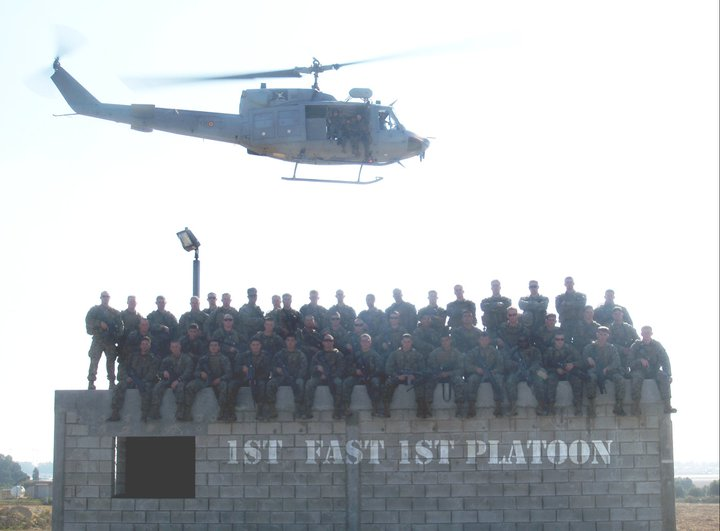
The marines of 1st FAST 1st Platoon after raiding a mock embassy in Rota Spain.

Since their inception, FAST Company marines have seen a heavy operations tempo, being deployed to participate in numerous training, security, and combat operations. In 1988, elements of 1st FAST had been deployed to Rodman Naval Station, Panama as a response to a number of incursions by unknown intruders (the intruders were believed to be members of a Cuban special operations unit who were attempting to sabotage US POL stockpiles located on the base). On alternating with US Army security elements, FAST conducted operations including combat and security patrols in the battle space, and establishing ambush positions along known avenues of approach. During one incident in April 1988, a Marine Corporal, an 0331 augment from the 2nd Marine Division, was killed by rifle fire during a half-hour long fire-fight with a force of about 30 well-armed soldiers, who were suspected to be Cuban special forces.

The FAST marines were successful in deterring further assaults, and on a number of occasions they captured infiltrators, attempting to gain entry to the base, under fire. On 21 December 1989 the US launched Operation Just Cause, the invasion of Panama. US forces were to secure the country and remove Panamanian military strongman, and the country's de facto leader, from power. Although primarily a US Army, and special operations forces mission, a select number of USMC units were to participate. One of the USMC units selected for the operation was 1st FAST Co.

1st FAST had been operating in Panama for some time providing security at US naval installations; conducting training exercises; and gearing up for any possible terrorist attack directed at USMC or USN facilities in Panama. 1st FAST along with a detachment from the 2nd Light Armored Infantry (LAI) Battalion, another new USMC unit, conducted several joint combat missions together. The 2nd LAI det. provided speed, armored protection, and heavy firepower, while 1st FAST provided CQB skills necessary for operating in the tight confines of an urban environment that was seen during the invasion.

During Operations Desert Storm and Desert Shield, FAST marines provided additional security to US naval installations in Bahrain.

In January 1991, the US Navy and Marines conducted Operation Sharp Edge, the noncombatant evacuation operation of US and foreign nationals from Liberia. FAST was deployed to relieve the Marine Amphibious Readiness Group that was providing security at the US embassy in Monrovia, Liberia.

Shortly after the conclusion of Vigilant Warrior, USCENTCOM found itself involved once again in Somalia, this time to cover the withdrawal of UNOSOM II in accordance with a United Nations decision to pull its forces out of that war ravaged country. After the withdrawal of US forces on 25 March 1994, the United States maintained a liaison office in Mogadishu in an attempt to further the process of political reconciliation in Somalia. Security for this office was provided by a FAST platoon. As conditions in Mogadishu deteriorated, the liaison office relocated to Nairobi and the FAST platoon redeployed to Mombasa, Kenya, on 15 September 1994, with FAST redeploying to home station three days later.

FAST Platoons also provided protection support for the transfer of Cuban migrants from Panama holding areas to Guantanamo Bay during Operation Safe Passage from January to February 1995. Following the 1996 bombing of a USAF barracks in Saudi Arabia, FAST marines responded. Elements of FAST Company arrived on the scene and secured several buildings within 10 hours.

During Operation Fairwinds in late 1996, FAST Platoons provided security for Navy Seabees and USAF Civil Engineers, work sites, camp sites, and convoys in Haiti.

In September 2001, a FAST platoon was deployed to New York City after the 9/11 attacks to provide security for the USNS Comfort.

During Operation Iraqi Freedom, Operation Enduring Freedom, and Operation Inherent Resolve FAST Platoons from FASTCENT provided Combat/QRF support for MEU (Marine Expeditionary Units). High Threat Protection and Embassy missions were conducted routinely during these operations throughout the Middle East.

During the attack on the U.S consulate in Benghazi, Libya on September 11, 2012, a FAST Platoon was deployed to the country to assist in combat operations.

Fast Platoons from FASTCENT assisted in Operation Ocean Shield on October 11, 2016, to assist in the counter piracy campaign against Somali pirates and Houthi Rebels from Yemen.

=== Organization ===
There are currently three FAST companies in the US and a training company. All Companies A, B, and C are located at Naval Weapons Station Yorktown, Yorktown, Virginia. These companies operate under the control of the Marine Corps Security Force Regiment located on Naval Air Station, Norfolk, Virginia, The Security Force Regiment Training Company is located on Naval Support Activity Hampton Roads, Northwest Annex (NSA Northwest), in Chesapeake, Virginia. Each company includes almost 400 marines, task-organized based upon mission.

=== Training ===
All Marines assigned to FAST must have completed the following training:

- Recruit Training (13 weeks)
- Infantry Marine Course (School of Infantry) (14 weeks)
- BSG (Basic Security Guard school) Security Force Training (6 weeks) - (NSA Northwest, Chesapeake, VA) - Teaches Combat Marksmanship (shotgun and pistol), Close Quarter Battle, machine guns, and non lethal training. Upon completion marines will be given the BMOS of 8152 (Basic Security Guard).
- AUT (Advanced Urban Tactics) (3 weeks)-(NSA Northwest, Chesapeake, VA) Additional training in CQB and riot control.

Optional schools:

- Close Quarter Battle School - 9 weeks long, MOS producing school mandatory for marines assigned to RTT. Note FAST marines that which have completed this course will NOT be granted the MOS (8154 CQB team member).
- BSR Summit Point, West Virginia High performance driving school that teaches, high risk driving, motorcade operations, evasive driving techniques, driving beyond normal limits, ramming, pit, close proximity, driver down and various other driving techniques.
- High Risk Personnel also known as executive protection, similar to protective services detail, the military version of Federal Law Enforcement Training Center focused heavily on providing High Threat Protection training. This course includes route reconnaissance and surveillance training.
- Inter-service Nonlethal Individual Weapons Instructor Course and other riot control techniques
- Helicopter and Rope Suspension Techniques Master Course, aka H.R.S.T., from Special Operations Training Group: This course focuses on how to properly rappel down structures and out of helicopter, fast rope out of helicopter, use Special Purpose Insertion and Extraction SPIE rigging and how to rig these systems to an aircraft with the proper gear for safe tactical operations.
- VBSS (Visit, Board, Search, Seizure): This training focuses on how to properly raid enemy vessels, oil rigs, and contested coastal areas via boat.
- Designated Marksman School: The course trains Marines to be able to conduct long range precision shooting.

During their training exercises, FAST makes extensive use of simulated ammunition or UTM. Si-munition and UTMs are like paintball ammunition, but it can be fired from weapons normally used by the unit instead of plastic guns. The USMC has seen fit to equip its FAST units with a wide array of weapons, and equipment to help them accomplish their mission. The FAST's arsenal is known to include M4 rifles, M4/M-203 40 mm grenade launchers, Modified M-14 rifles with specialized stocks to make them Designated Marksmen Rifles (DMR which has a composite stock and fixed magnification scope) or Enhanced Marksmen Rifle (EMR which has a SAGE stock with a specialized scope known as the Scout Sniper Day Scope or SSDS), Beretta M9A1 9mm pistols, Remington 870 shotguns, Benelli M1014 semi automatic shotgun, M-249 5.56mm Squad Automatic Weapons (SAWs), M-240B 7.62mm MMGs, Browning .50 Cal. HMGs, MK-19 40mm HMGs (automatic grenade launchers).

All these weapons can at any time be outfitted with the most advanced optics known today like ACOG, EoTech, AimPoint, various PEQ laser systems and night vision scopes. Almost all of FAST Company's missions are unknown, except by the members of that platoon. Charlie FAST Company from NAS Bahrain was sent to secure the embassy in Sanna Yemen in July 2011 just one year prior to the FAST's most recent mission that was known around the world and caught media attention was on 12 September 2012. A FAST team 1 from Rota, Spain was sent to Libya in response to the 2012 US Consulate attack in Benghazi.

== Recapture Tactics Team ==
The Recapture Tactics Team or RTT specializes In-Extremis Hostage Rescue (IEHR) and Nuclear Counter-Proliferation (NCP). RTT units are attached to Nuclear Weapon Stations aboard US naval installations and do not deploy. Whereas FAST Platoons deploy to areas in need of naval security operations, RTT has no need to deploy because they are already positioned in the appropriate strategic locations where they are most needed.

Marines assigned to Naval Nuclear Weapons Stations are given an opportunity, if the Command allows them, to try out for RTT, which is colloquially referred to within the nuclear commands as simply "CQB Platoon," or just "CQB."

Typically, only a small fraction of the marines who are permitted to try out (or “screen”) for the CQB Platoon are actually selected from the grueling 2 week selection process. Those who are selected then have a 4 week long tactical spin-up (a period of intensive preparatory training), in which the CQB Platoon's current Operators help to get the newly selected candidates ready. If they successfully complete the combined 6 week long tryout and spin-up, also known as Assessment and Selection, the RTT candidates then report to USMC CQB School where they undergo an intensive 9 week advanced combat marksmanship and dynamic assault course, during which they are taught In-Extremis Hostage Rescue and Nuclear Counter-Proliferation. The marines and sailors who attend this school learn to violently recapture, or take back by force, United States personnel and property that has been stolen, taken hostage or otherwise compromised.

If they pass the two-month long USMC CQB school, they have officially earned the 8154 MOS, and they then report back to their Naval Nuclear Weapons Command where they spend several more weeks getting "broken in" by the platoon as new Operators. Upon successfully completing that phase, the candidates are formally admitted onto the Recapture Tactics Team.

All RTT marines must attend the following schools to obtain the appropriate certifications:

- United States Marine Corps Recruit Training, viz., Boot Camp - 13 weeks long
- Marine Corps School of Infantry, Infantry Training Battalion (SOI-ITB) - 14 weeks long
- Basic Security Guard (Marine Corps Security Guard Anti-Terrorism Training) - 7 weeks long
- Close Quarter Battle School - 9 weeks long (not including platoon Assessment & Selection and the post-Schoolhouse breaking in period.)

And are eligible to attend the following courses, pending their command's approval:

- Designated Marksman Course
- Methods of Entry or MOE, (small unit demolition and door breaching tactics)

This is not in the pipeline fashion, as it is with other specialty units. RTT receives the "on job training" needed after going to CQB school, before going to the other schools listed.

The Marine Corps Security Forces Regiment's Close Quarters Battle Teams also go to various installations as Mobile Training Teams to teach CQB course to units such as but are not limited to: military police special reaction teams, other military branches (both American and allied), and law enforcement organizations (federal, state, county, local and international/foreign).

== See also ==
- 43 Commando Fleet Protection Group Royal Marines
- Marine Security Guard
- Office of Secure Transportation
- Torii for use of symbol on unit logo or patch
