= Maritime Civil Affairs and Security Training Command =

Former Echelon III command of the U.S. Navy (2009-2014)

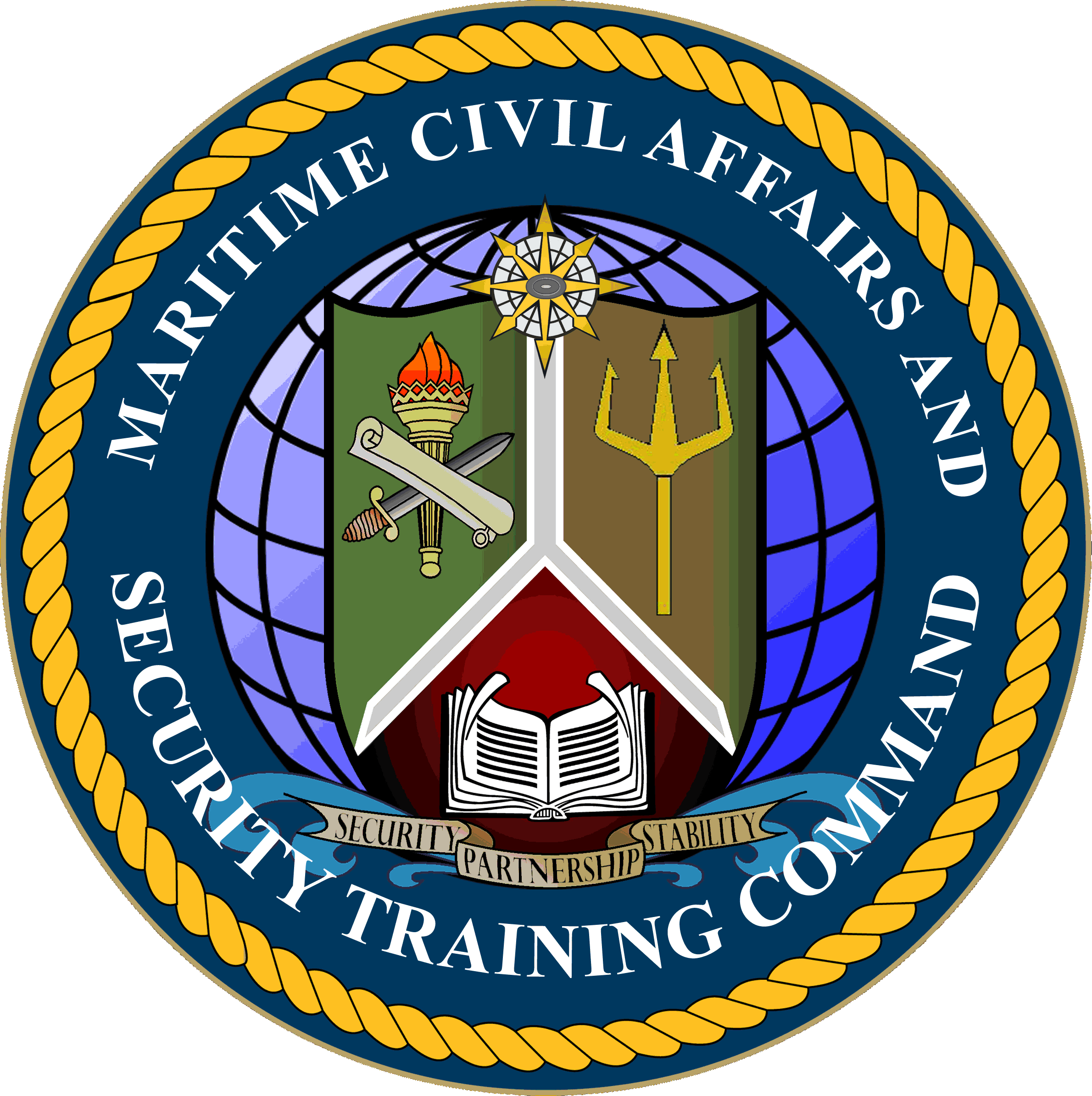
- Active: 2009 - 2014
- Country: United States of America
- Branch: United States Navy
- Type: Echelon III command
- Role: Phase Zero- Engagement/Presence/Stability
- Size: 300
- Garrison/HQ: NAS Oceana Dam Neck Annex
- Nickname: MCAST

Commanders
- Current commander: Captain Marc Gordnier, USN- to decommissioning

The Maritime Civil Affairs and Security Training Command (MCAST) provides personnel, trains, equips and deploys U.S. Navy sailors for a task force commander to establish and enhance relations between military forces, governmental and nongovernmental organizations and the civilian populace. Accomplished in a collaborative manner across the spectrum of operations in the maritime environment, MCAST Command executes civilian-to-military operations and military-to-military training, as directed, in support of security cooperation and security assistance requirements.

The MCAST Command prepares regionally aligned planners, teams, specialists and trainers to be effective, flexible and responsive in support of the Navy Component and Joint Task Force Commanders’ security cooperation plans. Enhancing partner-nation capability and capacity is accomplished by deploying fully qualified individuals and teams, trained to support civilian-to-military operations (MCA) and military-to-military training (SFA).

To support the Cooperative Strategy for 21st Century Seapower and the Navy's core competencies of Humanitarian Assistance/Disaster Relief and Maritime Security, MCAST Command fosters and sustains cooperative relationships across the Joint, Coalition, and Multinational spectrum to provide regional stability, prevent conflict and protect U.S. interests.

== History ==
MCAST Command combines the former Maritime Civil Affairs Group and the Expeditionary Training Command.

The Navy Expeditionary Combat Command (NECC) officially established Maritime Civil Affairs Group (MCAG) during a ceremony at Naval Amphibious Base (NAB) Little Creek, March 30, 2007 under the leadership of Navy Capt. Kenneth Swingshakl. Captain Claudia Risner, U.S. Navy, assumed command of MCAG in September, 2008. In an effort to consolidate staffs and resources, MCAG and the Expeditionary Training Command were merged and designated as the Maritime Civil Affairs and Security Training (MCAST) Command in a ceremony October 1, 2009. Captain Risner continued as the Commanding Officer of the new organization until Captain Frank Hughlett, U.S. Navy, assumed command of MCAST Command in September 2010. Captain Marc Gordnier assumed command in August 2012. MCASTCOM was ordered to disestablish in spring 2014 due to Navy Budget decisions. MCASTCOM decommissioned in May 2014.

== Teams ==
The command deploys two types of teams – Maritime Civil Affairs and Security Force Assistance – to support exercises and overseas contingency operations that enable partner nations to establish and exercise maritime security and sovereignty.

=== Maritime Civil Affairs Teams ===
MCA Teams (MCATs) specialize in the maritime environment – from Economic Exclusion Zones, to fisheries, to port and harbor operations and harbor/channel maintenance and reconstruction. MCATs are generally five-person teams consisting of a commander (usually a junior officer), coxswain, corpsman, communicator, and a construction rating or religious program specialist Sailor. MCAST also seeks Sailors with unique cultural expertise, such as native speakers, for missions where cultural exchange is necessary for success. MCATs liaison between an operational commander, U.S. country team, and host nation civil and military entities. They focus on benefitting the civilian populace, minimizing the military operations footprint and maximizing the humanitarian assistance impact.

=== Security Force Assistance Teams ===
Through Security Force Assistance Mobile Training Teams (SFA MTT), MCAST delivers maritime expeditionary core instruction in support of security cooperation and foreign internal defense missions. These efforts are directed at foreign country military, civil, and security personnel. SFA MTT experts from a variety of ratings perform as internally sourced team members. They provide critical training to partner nations that enhance security, partnership and stability. These teams deliver training in small boat operations and tactics, maritime combat operations, anti-terrorism/force protection, maintenance and construction, and military professional development and leadership. Lessons are taught in the host nation's language and are tailored to the nation's needs. SFA MTTs are also capable of providing non-standard training, such as running ranges, foreign weapons familiarization, and field training refreshers to support Navy Component Commanders. Teams deploy and train foreign militaries through a stand-alone event or in conjunction with planned fleet deployments, coordinated exercises, or regional engagement events.

== Core Competencies ==
=== Maritime Civil Affairs Plans and Operations ===
MCAST Command provides a plans and operations element capable of integrating with the operational (Navy Component or Joint Task Force) Commander.

Provides command and control of the MCAST-assigned forces and integrates MCA subject matter expertise into campaign plans and mission analysis. Assists with the preparation of country-specific plans, enhances partner-nation relationships and oversees area assessment, humanitarian assistance, disaster relief, and civic action projects.

=== Maritime Civil Affairs Assessment ===
MCAST provides regionally aligned MCA Teams that conduct civil reconnaissance and provide assessment of identified civilian domain infrastructure and capability requirements in support of the Commander's objectives in an area of focus.

- Maritime Security, Port operations and security
- Civilian medical care capability
- Marine resources and management

=== Maritime Functional Area Expertise ===
MCAST Command provides subject matter experts in functions that are specific to a wide range of maritime-related disciplines capable of assisting in the near-shore, riparian, and lake environments.

- Commercial port operations
- Marine resource management
- Public health
- Public education
- Civic/City Planning
- Civilian Law Enforcement & Emergency Management Services

=== Security Force Assistance Mobile Training Teams (SFA MTT) ===
MCAST Command delivers military maritime expeditionary core instruction to foreign militaries in support of security cooperation and foreign internal defense missions.

Subject areas:

- Small boat operations and tactics
- Maritime combat operations
- Weapons handling
- Anti-terrorism/Force protection
- Maintenance and construction
- Officer and non-commissioned officer professional development and leadership

Lessons are taught in the host nation's language. SFA MTTs are also capable of providing non-standard training, such as running ranges, foreign weapons familiarization, and field training refreshers to support the Navy Component Commanders.
