= Buckroe Beach =

Neighborhood in Hampton, Virginia, United States

Coordinates: 37°02′35″N 76°17′36″W

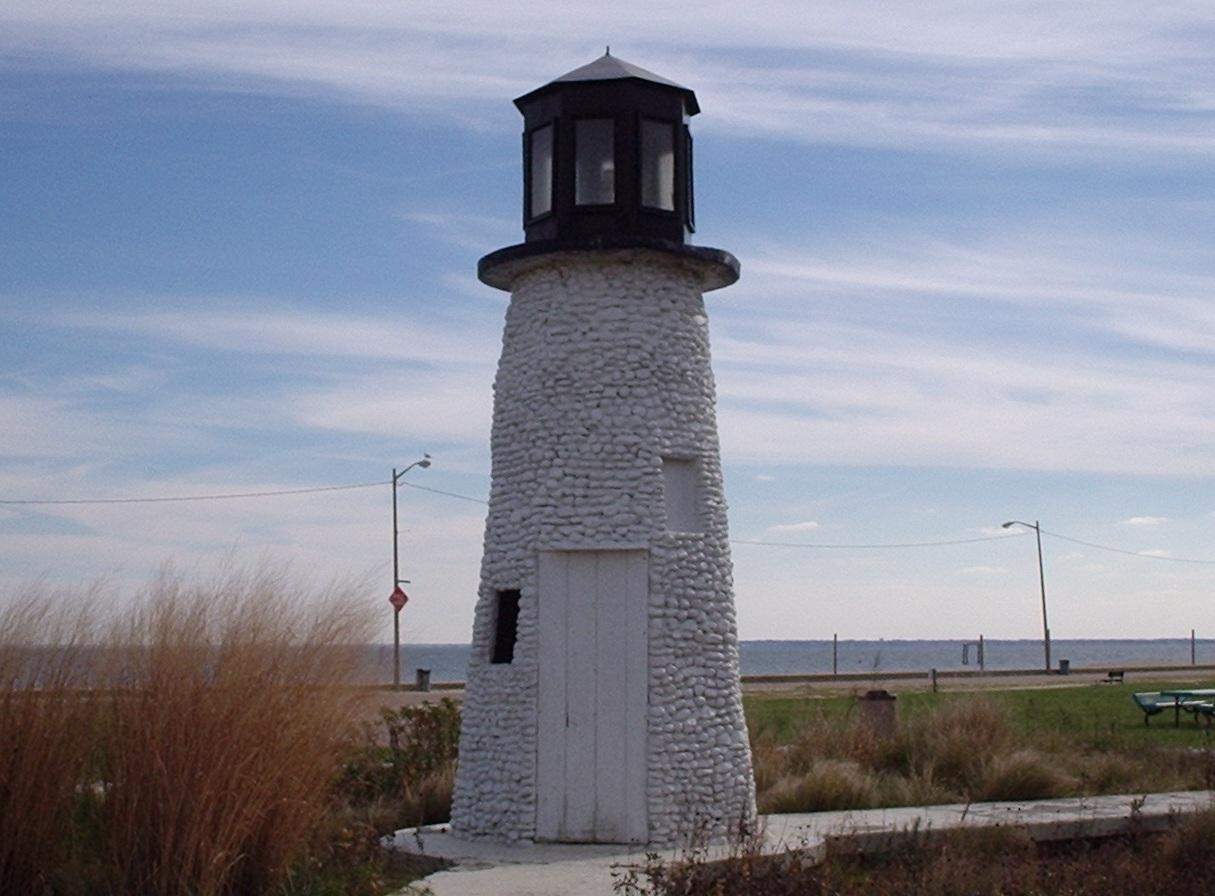
The old "Light House" at Buckroe Beach was built as a part of the amusement park .

Buckroe Beach is a neighborhood in the independent city of Hampton, Virginia. It lies just north of Fort Monroe on the Chesapeake Bay. One of the oldest recreational areas in the state, it was long located in the former Elizabeth City County near the downtown area of the lost town of Phoebus prior to their consolidation with Hampton in 1952.

== History ==
Footage of Buckroe Beach at sunset.

In 1619, the "Buck Roe" Plantation was designated for public use for the newly arrived English settlers of the Virginia Company of London. In 1620, the London Company sent Frenchmen there to teach the colonists grape and silkworm culture. By 1637, however, Buck Roe Plantation had joined the rest of the colony as a tobacco field.

Buckroe was used as a fishing camp until after the American Civil War. At the urging of community leader Harrison Phoebus, the Chesapeake and Ohio Railway built by Collis Huntington extended its tracks to the area in 1882. A boarding house for summer visitors was opened by Civil War widow of Joseph Bowers Herbert, Mrs. Mary Ann Dobbins Herbert, in 1883, and the next year a public bath house was built and tourists were brought in horse-drawn carriages. In 1897, a local entrepreneur extended his electric trolley car line to Buckroe, opened a hotel, a pavilion for dancing and an amusement park. In 1898, several African-American businessmen purchased a beachfront for Black vacationers next to Buckroe Beach, naming it Bay Shore Beach & Resort. This amusement park and vacation destination rivaled the popularity of Buckroe Beach during the era of racial segregation

The amusement park and adjacent public beach were popular destinations for social outings in the late 19th and first half of the 20th centuries. Until World War II, the C&O had summer excursion service to Buckroe, using its tracks and trolley tracks from Phoebus to Buckroe. Due to declining revenue because of competition from Busch Gardens Williamsburg and the developments in air conditioning, the amusement park closed in 1985 and was torn down in 1991. However, the Buckroe Beach Carousel and its Bruder band organ were preserved and relocated to the downtown Hampton waterfront area where it is a popular attraction. The only remaining relic from the amusement park that is still standing at Buckroe is the functioning lighthouse from the miniature golf course. The popular Buckroe Beach fishing pier was destroyed during Hurricane Isabel in 2003. The pier was rebuilt by the city of Hampton and opened for business on May 30, 2009. The pier is known for its cobia fishing, which has rivaled with the Grandview fishing pier for the most catches. Many fishermen can be found here on a busy summer day.

== Population ==
Buckroe Beach was defined as a census-designated place (then termed an unincorporated place) at the 1950 United States census with a population of 1,977. In 1952 Hampton consolidated with Elizabeth City County (including Phoebus) thus making Buckroe Beach a neighborhood of the city.
