= Grand Contraband Camp, Virginia =

The Grand Contraband Camp was located in Elizabeth City County, Virginia, on the Virginia Peninsula near Fort Monroe, during and immediately after the American Civil War. The area was a refuge for escaped slaves who the Union forces refused to return to their former Confederate masters, by defining them as "contraband of war". The Grand Contraband Camp was the first self-contained black community in the United States and occupied the area of the downtown section of the present-day independent city of Hampton, Virginia.

== Confederate slaves in Union hands: legal status ==
When Virginia seceded from the United States in 1861, the US Army retained control of Fort Monroe at the eastern tip of the Virginia Peninsula. During much of the American Civil War, the commander at Fort Monroe was Brigadier General Benjamin Butler, a lawyer by profession and an opponent of slavery.

Three slaves, Frank Baker, James Townsend, and Sheppard Mallory had been contracted by their owners to the Confederate Army under General Benjamin Huger to help construct defense batteries at Sewell's Point, across the mouth of Hampton Roads from Union-held Fort Monroe. They escaped at night and rowed a skiff to Old Point Comfort, where they sought asylum at Fort Monroe.

Prior to the War, slave owners could legally request their return (as property) under the federal Fugitive Slave Act of 1850. However, since Virginia had seceded from the Union, General Butler took the position that if Virginia considered itself a foreign power, then he was under no obligation to return the three men. He determined to hold them as "contraband of war" since the Confederate states considered slaves to be chattel (property). When Confederate Major John B. Cary requested their return, Butler denied it. The three men worked for the Union Army but were given minimal pay.

The term "contraband" in referring to escaped slaves first entered the Official Records in U.S. Navy correspondence on August 10, 1861, when Acting Master William Budd of the gunboat USS Resolute used the term.

The US Confiscation Act of 1861 clarified the issue of slaves' status during the war; it declared that Union forces could seize any property used by the Confederate military, including slaves. Many, including slaves, saw this as a means of unofficially freeing the slaves from Southerners' control, and they began to go to Union lines.

Their journey to freedom was fraught with difficulties. Besides the risk of re-enslavement from Confederate patrols, Union pickets were apt to loot refugees when possible. A contemporary account from the American Freedmen's Inquiry Commission:

In connection with the probabilities of our obtaining the above number of colored troops, it is the duty of the Commission to report the fact that, in too many cases, not injustice only but robbery and other crimes have been committed against fugitives on first entering our lines. As an example: the Assistant Superintendent at Suffolk, Virginia, informed the Commission that instances had come to his knowledge of pickets who sometimes kept refugees until their masters came for them, and sometimes sent them back, pocketing the reward; the examples, however, of this offence were not numerous. He stated further, that, "in hundreds of cases," the refugees had been robbed by the pickets, chiefly of money, but occasionally of other articles. Valuable horses, too, and other property, were taken from them by the Quartermaster, without remuneration to the refugee who brought them in.

== The camp is created ==
The word spread quickly among southeastern Virginia's slave communities. While becoming a "contraband" did not mean full freedom, many slaves found it preferable to staying where they were. The day after Butler's decision, many more escaped slaves found their way to Fort Monroe and appealed for "contraband" status. The area attracted those slaves who could escape, which included determined families and women with children.

As the number of former slaves grew too large to be housed inside the Fort, they began to build housing from the ruins of Hampton left by the Confederates. They called their new settlement the Grand Contraband Camp (which they nicknamed "Slabtown"). By the end of the war in April 1865, less than four years later, an estimated 10,000 slaves had applied to gain "contraband" status, and many lived nearby. The contraband slaves of the Virginia Peninsula are credited with establishing the United States' first self-contained African-American community, where they quickly created schools, churches, businesses, and other social organizations.

Other contraband camps sprang up in many areas during the Civil War, often near Union bases. One mile from Slabtown was Sugar Hill, a contraband camp established in 1861 and associated with the Union's Camp Hamilton which would later become part of the town of Phoebus. Another notable location was at Roanoke Island on North Carolina's Outer Banks. This was the former site of the "Lost Colony" of 1587, almost 300 years earlier.

== Contrabands join the Union cause ==
Many contraband slaves and free blacks voluntarily served in the Union Army, forming the United States Colored Troops (USCT). Some also became scouts, guides, spies, cooks, hospital workers, blacksmiths, and mule-drivers, contributing immensely to the Union war effort for the balance of the Civil War. Numerous Union officers became more aware of both the potential and plight of the contrabands, and worked for and made contributions to educational efforts for them, even after the War.

== Education ==
Near Fort Monroe, but outside its protective walls, in an area that later became part of the Hampton University campus, pioneering teachers Mary S. Peake and others began to teach both former slaves and free blacks of the area. Peake had been teaching secretly, defying the 1831 Virginia law against educating slaves and free blacks passed after Nat Turner's slave rebellion. Such efforts to teach the former slaves were aided by the American Missionary Association; based in the North, its leaders included both black and white ministers from chiefly Congregational and Presbyterian churches. Reverend Lewis C. Lockwood arrived at Fort Monroe in September as its first missionary to the former slaves; he sponsored Peake, a Mrs. Bailey and Miss Jennings, and an unnamed free black, for a total of three day schools for contrabands by the winter of 1861.

Peake held her first classes outdoors, often under a large oak tree. In 1863, it was the site of a public reading of President Abraham Lincoln's Emancipation Proclamation to the contrabands and free blacks, and the tree became called the Emancipation Oak. It has been designated a National Historic Landmark and is within the Historic District of Hampton University.

For most of the contrabands, full freedom did not come until the Thirteenth Amendment to the U.S. Constitution abolishing slavery was ratified in late 1865.

Because Southern states had prohibited teaching slaves (and, later, free blacks), education of freedmen during and after the war was a major goal of the freedmen and their allies. The American Missionary Association, which founded Hampton Institute and numerous other historically black colleges, and other religious organizations were important in founding both elementary and higher-level schools and colleges, to train teachers who could teach the children and adults.

In addition, former Union Army officers and soldiers and wealthy philanthropists in the late 19th and early 20th centuries created and funded educational efforts for the betterment of African Americans in the South. They helped found normal schools to generate teachers for the millions of new black students in the South. Two such schools eventually became Hampton University and Tuskegee University.

In the first decades of the 20th century, the philanthropist Julius Rosenwald collaborated with Dr. Booker T. Washington and his staff at Tuskegee to create an architectural model and matching fund to support improving rural elementary schools for black children, which were historically underfunded by Southern states in their segregated system. The Rosenwald Fund, with required matching efforts by black communities, generated the construction of more than 5,000 mostly rural schools for black children in the South. Other philanthropists, such as Andrew Carnegie, Henry Rogers, and George Eastman also gave substantial support to Tuskegee and other black institutions.

== Legacy ==
In the years during and after the American Civil War, former slaves and their descendants made enormous contributions in many areas to include education, politics, business, law, medicine, planning and development, military service, the arts and other professional areas of endeavor to include a financial institution established in the City of Hampton.

In modern times, their descendants formed the Contraband Historical Society to honor and perpetuate their story. Authors such as Phyllis Haislip have written about the contraband slaves as well.

Some of the streets within the Grand Contraband Camp, which were named at that time, still exist near downtown Hampton. These include Grant Street, Lincoln Street, Union Street, Hope Street (now High Court Lane), and Liberty Street (now Armistead Avenue).

== See also ==
- Act Prohibiting the Return of Slaves
- American Freedmen's Inquiry Commission
- Grove, Virginia
