= Bay Shore Beach =

Beach in Hampton, Virginia, United States

Coordinates: 37°3′17″N 76°17′8.9″W

Bay Shore Beach was a beach that existed adjacent to Buckroe Beach in Hampton, Virginia in the 20th century. It was founded in 1898 by several African-American businessmen. The beach was one of the most popular resort and vacation destinations in the Mid-Atlantic region for African-Americans. In addition to standard beach activities, hotels, and restaurants, Bay Shore also had an amusement park. The beach was in its prime of popularity from 1898 until 1933 when a Hurricane devastated the coast. Both "sides" of the beach, (Bay Shore & Buckroe) were respectively rebuilt, however, Bay Shore may not have been built back to its former heights, although it continued to remain popular.

Frank D. Banks, an administrator at Hampton Normal and Agricultural Institute, led the effort to develop beachfront property on the Chesapeake Bay. Head bookkeeper at Hampton Institute, Banks helped organize People's Savings and Loan in 1888. He also helped establish the Hampton Supply Company. Banks formed the Bay Shore Hotel Company with a group of local leaders that included John Mallory Phillips and Robert Moton. Phillips operated a seafood business on the Hampton River. Moton also was an administrator at Hampton Institute.

After the hurricane, Charles Holston Williams led the effort to redevelop the property. Another key figure in the rebuilding effort was Lawrence Barbour, a Hampton graduate who was an executive at People's Building and Loan Association. Williams served as president of the New Bay Shore Hotel Corporation and managed the property for many years.

Bay Shore beach ceased to exist by the early 1970s. Buckroe Beach, its white counterpart, continues to exist although its golden era ended with the upstart of Virginia Beach located in the city of Virginia Beach, Virginia. Currently, the property that was once Bay Shore Beach has been privately developed to various degrees by developers.
