= Hayslip =

Hayslip is a surname. Notable people with the surname include:

- Ben Hayslip (born 1970), American country songwriter
- Le Ly Hayslip (born 1949), Vietnamese-American writer and humanitarian

== See also ==
- Haislip
