= Phoebus, Virginia =

Unincorporated town in Virginia, US

- Phoebus Historic District
- U.S. National Register of Historic Places
- U.S. Historic district
- Virginia Landmarks Register
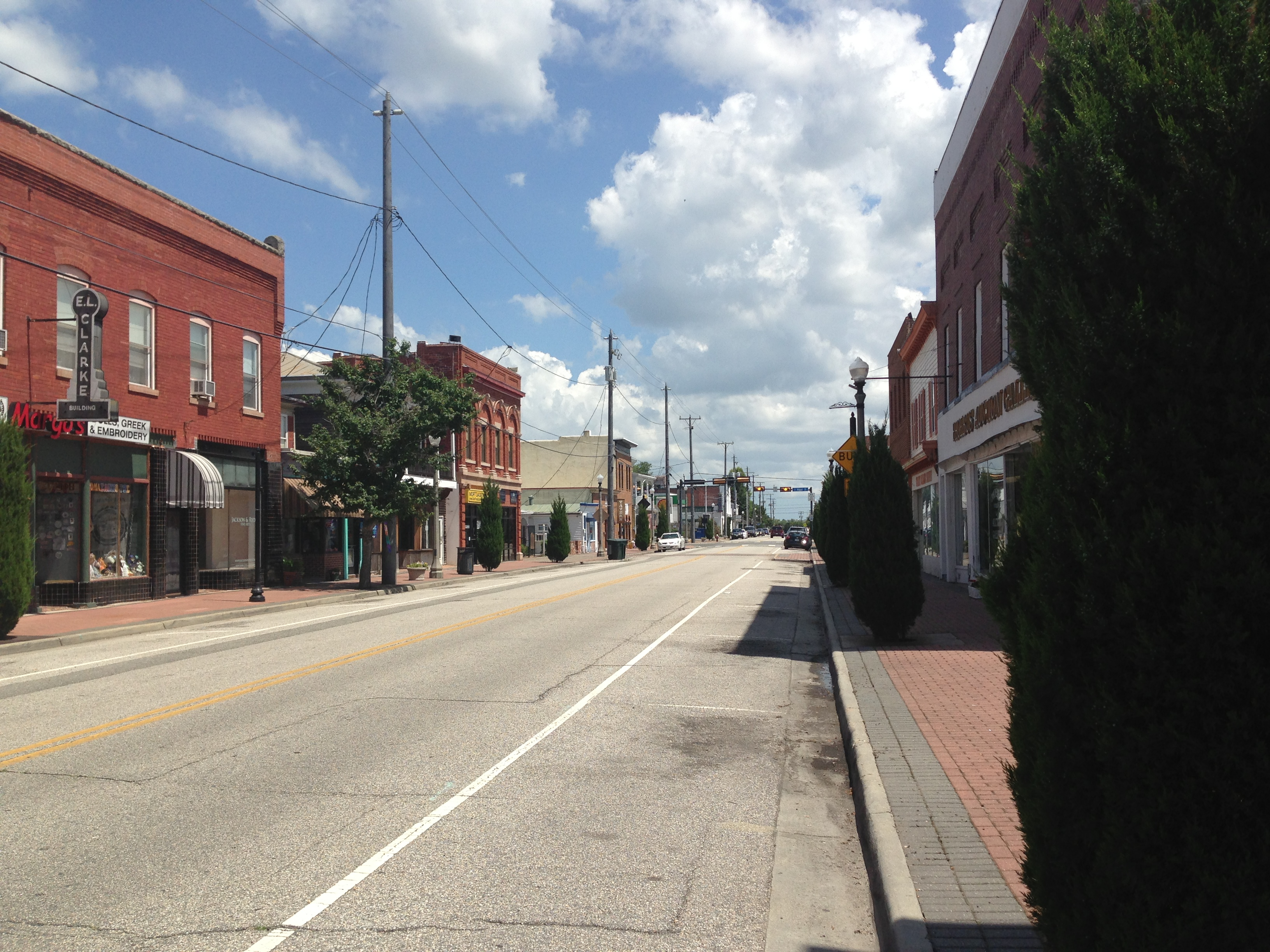
- Historic Phoebus in 2013, viewed from East Mellen Street

- Location within Virginia Location within the United States
- Location: Roughly bounded by VA 64, Mallory St., E. County St. and Willard Ave., Hampton, Virginia
- Coordinates: 37°01′18″N 76°19′05″W
- Area: 86 acres (35 ha)
- Built: 1874
- Architect: Holtzclaw, Charles Taylor; Wenderoth, Oscar
- Architectural style: Late Victorian, Late 19th And 20th Century Revivals
- NRHP reference No.: 06001098
- VLR No.: 114-5002

Significant dates
- Added to NRHP: December 1, 2006
- Designated VLR: September 6, 2006

Phoebus (known as Chesapeake City from 1871–1899) is a formerly incorporated town now part of the present-day city of Hampton, Virginia, on the Virginia Peninsula. In 1900, it was named in honor of local businessman Harrison Phoebus (1840–1886), who is credited with convincing the Chesapeake and Ohio Railway (C&O) to extend its tracks to the town from Newport News.

The town was consolidated by a slim margin during a 1952 public referendum with the independent city of Hampton. Phoebus is now an important historic neighborhood of Hampton and is listed on the National Register of Historic Places.

== History ==
Captain John Smith landed on a part of Phoebus known as Strawberry Banks on his first voyage up the James River in 1607. The area which became the Town of Phoebus was founded in 1609 as Mill Creek; it was located on the banks of the Chesapeake Bay and Hampton Roads, directly across from Norfolk's Willoughby Spit.

Mill Creek was located in Elizabeth Cittie [sic], one of four corporations, termed "citties" [sic], which were designated in 1619 by the Virginia Company of London, proprietor of the colony, to encompass the developed areas. (The other three were James Cittie, Charles Cittie, and Henrico Cittie). In 1634, the area became part of Elizabeth City Shire, one of the eight original shires of Virginia. It became Elizabeth City County in 1643.

English colonists soon built defensive fortifications at Old Point Comfort to protect the entrance to Hampton Roads. In 1819 the United States Army began construction there of Fort Monroe, which until 2011 was the oldest active-duty fort in the nation.

During the American Civil War, numerous slaves escaped to Fort Monroe and Norfolk, which was occupied by Union forces from 1861. The US Army defined them as contraband, to prevent their being returned to slaveholders. They established facilities for the newly free slaves at the Fort Monroe Contraband Camp, located outside the fort. Officials contacted a respected local teacher, Mary S. Peake, and asked her to teach the freedmen and their children. She began by gathering people outside in Phoebus, under a large oak tree. This is where the Emancipation Proclamation was read to numerous citizens in 1863, and it became called the Emancipation Oak. The American Missionary Association (AMA), whose leaders included both black and white ministers, hired her to teach and arranged for her to use the Brown Cottage. This is considered the historic start of Hampton University, a historically black college (HBCU) which the AMA founded during the war.

Much of the Town of Phoebus was cultivated as Roseland Farm until 1871. It was then divided into lots for sale and developed as Chesapeake City. The streets were named after prominent citizens: Mallory, Curry, Hope, Lancer, and Mellen.

When the town was incorporated in 1900, its name was changed to Phoebus in honor of its leading citizen, Harrison Phoebus, who is largely credited with getting the Chesapeake and Ohio Railway (C&O) to build the Hampton Branch. After the railroad's Peninsula Extension reached the new coal pier at Newport News in late 1881, the same construction crews were put to work on what would later be called the Peninsula Subdivision's Hampton Branch. From the main line at Old Point Junction, tracks were extended easterly a distance of about 10 miles (16 km) toward Fort Monroe. The tracks were completed about 9 miles (14 km) to the town, which became Phoebus in December 1882. A passenger and freight station was opened, which the railroad designated as "Phoebus".

From Phoebus, an extension across Mill Creek to reach Fort Monroe required a 2,800-foot-long (850 m) trestle, not completed until 1890. At that time, passenger and freight facilities were also added. At Fort Monroe, the U.S. Army built connecting tracks and operated its own locomotive for a number of years. The station at Fort Monroe closed in 1939. Accordingly, the Chesapeake & Ohio moved its Zero Mile Post north from Old Point Comfort to Phoebus, meaning that the town became the origin point for the C&O's trains such as the Sportsman bound for Cincinnati and Detroit, the George Washington, as well as other trains due west.

At Old Point Comfort, in addition to the Army base at Fort Monroe, the Hampton Branch served both the older Hygeia Hotel and the new Hotel Chamberlin, popular destinations for civilians. During the first half of the 20th century, excursion trains were operated to reach nearby Buckroe Beach, where an amusement park was among the attractions that brought church groups and vacationers.

In 1952 by voter referendum, the residents of Elizabeth City County and the town of Phoebus agreed to consolidation with the independent city of Hampton, Virginia.

Between 1953 and 1954, the C&O stopped using Phoebus as the terminus of its Norfolk/Hampton Roads area passenger trains. The company shifted that terminus, by then being for the George Washington and the Sportsman to Newport News station.

=== Recent decades ===
Phoebus has an area listed as an historic district on the National Register of Historic Places. The Phoebus National Historic District is a 86-acre (350,000 m^{2}) section of Phoebus which encompasses the historic business area on Mellen and Mallory Streets and a significant number of homes.

== Notable people ==
- Ralph Wolfe Cowan (1931–2018), artist
- John William "Uncle Jack" Dey (1912–1978), noted and celebrated folk painter
- Christopher C. Kraft Jr. (1924–2019), the original Flight Director for NASA, was born and raised in Phoebus.
- Mary S. Peake (1823–1862), first teacher of freedmen and their children in Phoebus
- William T. Randall, (1915–2013), Negro league baseball player
- George R. E. Shell, (1908–1996), Ninth superintendent of Virginia Military Institute, Brigadier general in the United States Marine Corps

== See also ==
- Fort Algernon
- Kecoughtan, Virginia
- Old Point Comfort
- Former counties, cities, and towns of Virginia
- List of former United States counties
