= Charles Holston Williams =

American choreographer and professor of physical education

Charles Williams
- Born: January 25, 1886; Lexington, Kentucky, U.S.
- Died: 1978
- Other name: Chas. H. Williams
- Occupations: Choreographer, professor of physical education

Charles Holston Williams (January 25, 1886 – 1978) was an American choreographer and professor of physical education. He was the organizer and first director of the Hampton Institute Creative Dance Group, the first national touring company composed of college students. Williams was also an associate professor and supervisor of the Physical Education Department at the Hampton Institute—now known as Hampton University—in Hampton, Virginia.

== Early life ==
Williams was born in Lexington, Kentucky, on January 25, 1886. In 1904, he attended high school at Berea College, but the following year Williams transferred to Hampton Institute because the state general assembly had passed the Day Law, stating that blacks and whites could no longer attend the same schools. At Hampton Institute, Williams resumed his high school education and continued on to further his college education.

In college, Williams excelled in football, basketball, and baseball and gained the reputation of being an outstanding athlete. However, in 1910, he fell from a scaffold while painting a house, injured his knees, and was told that he would never be able to walk again. Williams' persistence, a trait that enabled him to complete several visionary projects during his lifetime, allowed him to recover and pull himself through this rough time. That same year, Williams became the director of physical training at Hampton Institute.

== Career ==
Williams' interest in dance came from his deep involvement in physical education and recreation. He believed that athletic and social games, track and field meets, as well as other rhythmic movement activities served as a tool for self-improvement and development. Furthermore, Williams thought that dance served an important purpose of connecting African Americans to their heritage. This idea foreshadows the philosophy behind the Harlem Renaissance, which came a few years after.

In 1917, Williams organized annual physical education demonstrations in which the students and faculty at the Hampton Institute performed drills, gymnastics, and dances for the public. Students performed L'Zoronta, a Spanish dance, and the Tarantella, an Italian folk dance. At this time, Williams had not yet incorporated his idea about the heritage of African Americans and dance movement; this implementation was to come in subsequent years.

In 1925, the Denishawn Company performed at Hampton's Ogden Hall. The company's appearance allowed for a mutually supportive relationship between Ted Shawn and Williams during the 1930s. In 1934, Ted Shawn even contributed one of his dances to the Hampton Creative Dance Group.

In 1930, Williams attended the Harvard University Summer School of Physical Training, earned his master's degree, as well as took dance classes. In 1937 and 1938 he attended the Bennington Summer School of Dance where he observed classes and attended various performances. These two schools shaped his knowledge on dance as well as improved his dance technique, and choreography.

On Hampton's sixty-sixth anniversary celebration, on April 26 and 27, 1934, Williams presented a program of "interpretive dances". Two pieces, The Feast of Ramadan, which was about the Muslim celebration after a month of fasting, and Ya Ma Wisee, which was a dance of thanksgiving, were the first two dances to become a part of the Hampton Creative Dance Group repertoire.

== The Hampton Institute Creative Dance Group ==
In 1934, Williams established the Hampton Institute Creative Dance Group. Williams, along with the help of some of his male African students, choreographed works that were to be performed by the company. Frank O. Roberts from Liberia, was Williams' most outstanding student and was a featured soloist with the Hampton company. In the early stages, it was the male dancers who were predominantly featured throughout the Hampton group's repertoire. Williams exemplified his affinity for working with male students in his energetic, athletic work entitled Men of Valor, which was also presented during the anniversary of Hampton Institute in 1934. Williams' background as an athlete served as inspiration for this work as he used the movements from sports such as boxing and shot-putting, as the basis of his choreography.

Through the years, Williams reached out to female faculty members to assist him. His best known co-director was Charlotte Moten, who worked with the company from 1936 to 1942. The addition of female dancers to the company increased when Moten began working with Williams. In 1936, the company had become officially recognized as a welcome addition to the other performance groups on campus and embarked on its series of tours.

In 1937, the company went on a southern tour in April and performed at the major black colleges - Florida A&M in Tallahassee, Tuskegee Institute in Alabama, and North Carolina A&T. During the winter, they performed at Bryn Mawr College in Pennsylvania, high schools in New Jersey, the YM-YWHA's Theresa L. Kaufmann Auditorium in New York, and the Lafayette Theatre in Harlem. Some of the works that were performed included: Dis Ole Hammer – Water Boy, Mama Parah, which involved Roberts doing West African movements on stilts, Wyomami, a work that dealt with African marriage customs, and The Fangai Man, which centered on the West Indian Obeah man. The company continued touring and received favorable reviews from many popular periodicals such as Time magazine, and the New York Sun Times. They abruptly stopped, however, when America was drawn into World War II, and many of the men dancing at Hampton had to leave school to defend their country. The company resumed in 1946 but very slowly because Williams was too pressured from universities, the community, and his business responsibilities. In 1951, Williams retired from Hampton.

The influence of the company on the development of Negro concert dance was very significant. Even though the company was composed of amateurs who were Hampton Institute students majoring in physical education, these students were eventually going to go on teaching in the segregated Negro schools throughout the country. Williams' students brought with them a dance training that had the potential for creating future programs as well as the ability to educate audience members

Today, the Hampton Institute Creative Dance Group is known as the Terpischorean Dance Company and performs at Hampton University and in the surrounding community. They showcase the talents of Hampton students who have studied tap, ballet, African, jazz, modern, and other forms of dance. Hampton University has "paid homage to the cultural significance of the Black Dance experience and provides students with diverse cultural opportunities in the predominantly African American Dance Company."

== Technique and style ==
Williams was famous for his use of African diasporas in his modern dance choreography. His innovative style came from his ability to fuse cultural and spiritual themes with modern elements. The Dance Group also used Haitian and African religious dance forms, as well as Negro spirituals. Apart from African dances, Williams also chose to infuse his works with black American material. For example, he used some of the older plantation dances such as the Juba and Cake-Walk in his choreography.

== Literature ==
The Southern Workman (1917): an article Williams published in Hampton's monthly journal that dealt with his ideas concerning the importance of movement in the lives of young people.

Cotton Needs Pickin' (1928): explores the relationship between art, recreation, and the folklore of black Americans. Williams also included a documentation of numerous folk dances native to southern blacks, and included written descriptions, lines of music, and photographs.

Other works include: Characteristic Negro Folk Dances, Negro Soldiers in World War I: The Human Side, Sidelights on Negro Soldiers, and The Race Problem.

== See also ==
- Bay Shore Beach
