= 140th Anniversary Celebration of the Emancipation Proclamation =

National campaign celebrates 140th anniversary of Emancipation Proclamation

- 140th Anniversary Celebration of the Emancipation Proclamation logo
- Official name: 140th Anniversary Celebration of the Emancipation Proclamation
- Observed by: People of the United States
- Liturgical color: (White)
- Type: Historical American
- Significance: Spirit, strength and legacy of freedom, justice and equality for all people of America
- Celebrations: Yearlong celebration and learning about the past to better understand the experiences that shaped the Nation
- Date: January 1, 2003
- Frequency: once
- Related to: Emancipation Proclamation; Slavery in the United States

The 140th Anniversary Celebration of the Emancipation Proclamation was a national campaign to honor, celebrate, and commemorate January 1, 2003, as the 140th anniversary of the signing of the Emancipation Proclamation on January 1, 1863, by United States President Abraham Lincoln.

== History ==
This historical commemoration of the Emancipation Proclamation came, shortly after September 11, 2001, as a venue for national celebration. The 140th anniversary of the Emancipation Proclamation celebrates the progression of the United States, and was reminiscent of a similar period in American history, following the Civil War. As momentum for the anniversary celebration grew, Americans joined in to participate across the United States.

Sam Waterston, best known from the Law and Order television program, organized volunteers to clean, paint, and restore Lincoln's Cottage at the Soldier's Home in Washington, D.C., for this milestone anniversary.

The first reading of the proclamation in The South occurred at the Emancipation Oak located on the campus of Hampton University in what is now the city of Hampton, Virginia. This is the same site where Mary Smith Peake had earlier taught children of former slaves under the same tree. The Emancipation Oak, a National Historical Landmark, was itself a catalyst for the 140th anniversary celebration of the Emancipation Proclamation. Subsequently, in 2004, the oak was named America's national tree.

The nearby city of Newport News, Virginia held a First Reading anniversary celebration consisting of a presentational reading of the Emancipation Proclamation with living historians portraying slaves to emphasize the meaning of President Lincoln's historic act of universal manumission. The event was held in the Newport News City Council chambers, and included a resolution issued by the city's mayor, Joe Frank, as to the significance of the celebratory year.

The Network to Freedom website, honoring the Underground Railroad, was launched by the United States National Park Service to coincide with the 140th anniversary.

== Legislative resolution ==
Early bipartisan congressional supporters of the 140th Anniversary Celebration of the Emancipation Proclamation were Danny K. Davis (Dem. IL) who sponsored the legislation in the United States House of Representatives as House Concurrent Resolution 36. The legislation was sponsored in the United States Senate by Senator George Allen (Rep. VA), as Senate Concurrent Resolution 15.

=== Text ===
The text of the final resolution reads as follows:

Commemorating the 140th year anniversary of the issuance of the Emancipation Proclamation.

Resolved by the Senate the House of Representatives concurring, that congress:

(1.) recognizes the historical significance of the 140th anniversary of the Emancipation Proclamation as an important period in our Nation's history; and

(2.) encourage its celebration in accordance with the spirit, strength, and legacy of freedom, justice, and equality for all people of America and to provide an opportunity for all people of the United States to learn more about the past and to better understand the experiences that have shaped the Nation.

The bill passed in both houses of the United States Congress by unanimous vote.
