= Haislip =

Haislip is a surname. Notable individuals with this surname include:

- Alison Haislip (b. 1981), American television commentator and actress
- Jim Haislip (1891-1970), American baseball player
- Marcus Haislip (b. 1980), American basketball player
- Phyllis Haislip (b. 1944), American author and historian
- Wade H. Haislip (1889-1971), United States Army general
