= Virginia Air and Space Science Center =

Aerospace museum in Hampton, Virginia

Virginia Air and Space Center
- Established: 1992
- Location: Hampton, Virginia
- Coordinates: 37.023944°N 76.344498°W
- Type: Aerospace
- Visitors: 345,000
- Director: Brian DeProfio (interim)
- President: James Reade Chisman
- Curator: Allen R. Hoilman
- Website: Official website

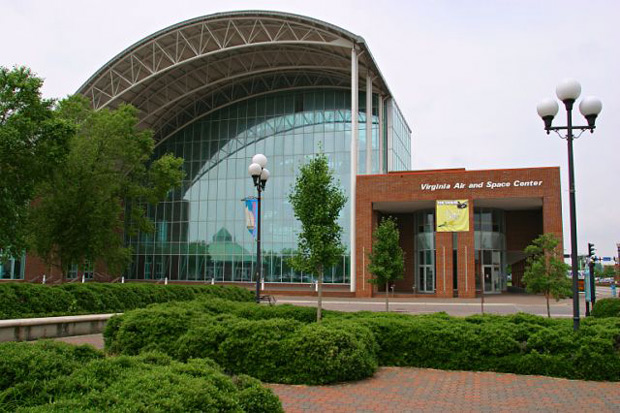
VASC exterior

The Virginia Air and Space Science Center is a museum and educational facility in Hampton, Virginia that also serves as the visitors center for NASA's Langley Research Center and Langley Air Force Base. The museum also features an IMAX digital theater and offers summer aeronautic- and space-themed camps for children.

The museum includes the Apollo 12 Command Module Yankee Clipper.

== Collection ==
The museum's permanent collection is housed in a three-story glass atrium accessible from two exhibit floors with an additional catwalk level available for viewing suspended aircraft from above. Volunteers maintain an amateur radio exhibit displaying modern and historic radio equipment. The exhibit also participates in the Space Amateur Radio Experiment where visitors can periodically talk to astronauts aboard the International Space Station.

=== Adventures in Flight gallery ===
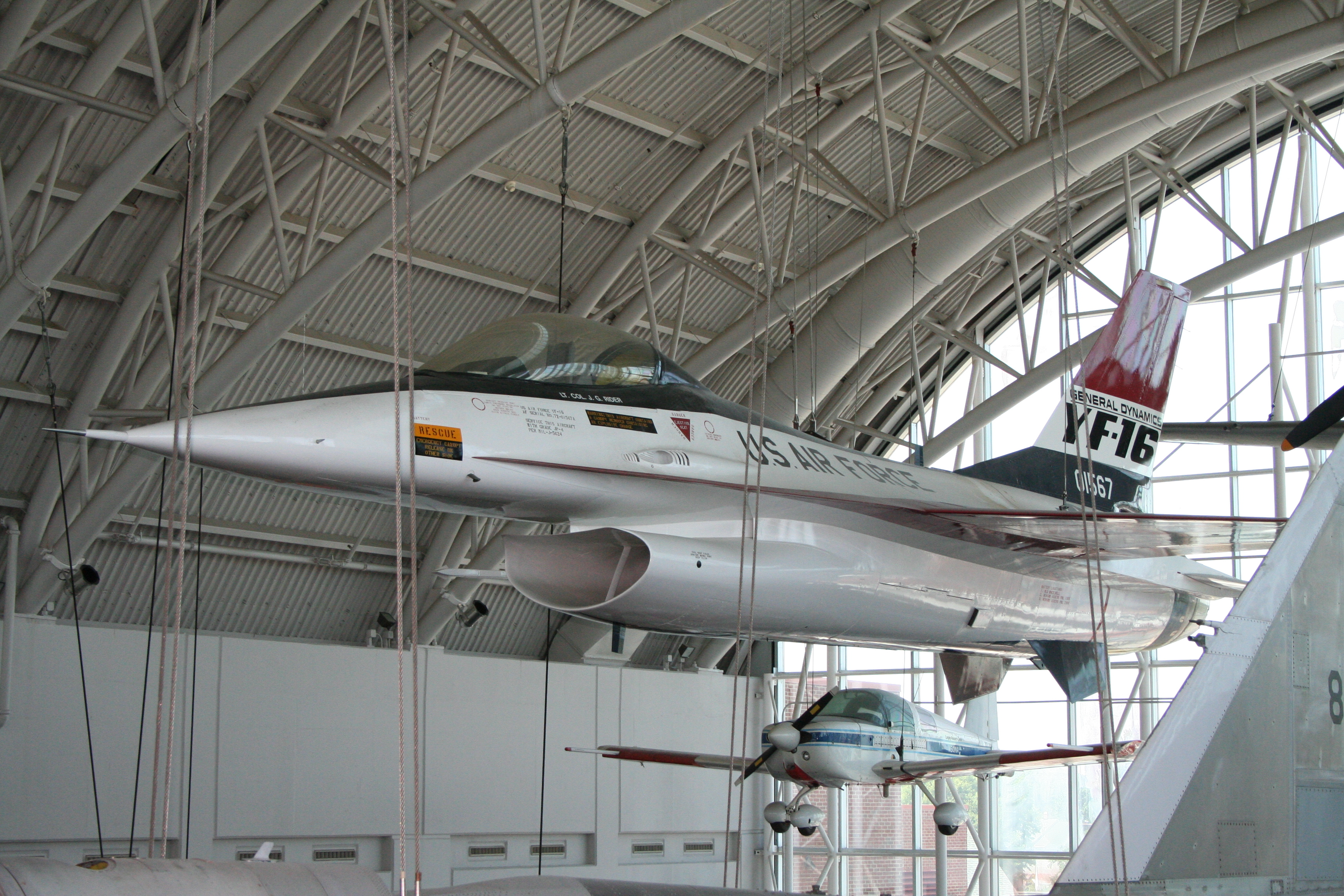
A YF-16 on display at the Virginia Air and Space Center.

The gallery emphasizes hands-on and immersive experiments on flight concepts such as control surfaces and propeller design, and experiences such as flight simulators. The gallery also features numerous aircraft suspended from the roof in the main gallery. Most are restored and have close ties to flight research performed at area NASA, Air Force and Naval installations.

- A McDonnell Douglas DC-9-32 passenger aircraft donated by AirTran Airways dominates the gallery. Visitors can sit in cockpit, first class and coach seats, and try their hand at take off and landing of a Boeing 717 flight simulator on board. Computer monitors are mounted in the first class passenger windows displaying left and right views of the flight simulator.
- B-24D "Liberator" heavy bomber which features an onboard film giving visitors the feeling that they are riding along with the pilots.
- 1903 Wright Flyer replica
- Lockheed Martin F-22 Raptor cockpit replica
- Grumman A-6 Intruder Nose Section
- Bell P-39Q Airacobra
- Convair F-106B Delta Dart
- McDonnell-Douglas F-4E Phantom II
- Lockheed F-104C Starfighter
- General Dynamics F-16 Fighting Falcon Nose Section
- F-18 High Alpha Research Vehicle "HARV"
- Republic F-84F Thunderstreak
- Grumman-American Yankee Aircraft
- Hawker Siddeley Kestrel XV-6A
- KITFOX Model 4 Speedster
- Pershing II Missile
- Piper J-3 Cub
- Pitts Special
- Rutan VariEze homebuilt light aircraft
- Schleicher ASW 12 Glider
- Stearman N2S-3 Trainer
- UH-1M "Iroquois" Helicopter
- YF-16 "Fighting Falcon"

=== Space Gallery ===
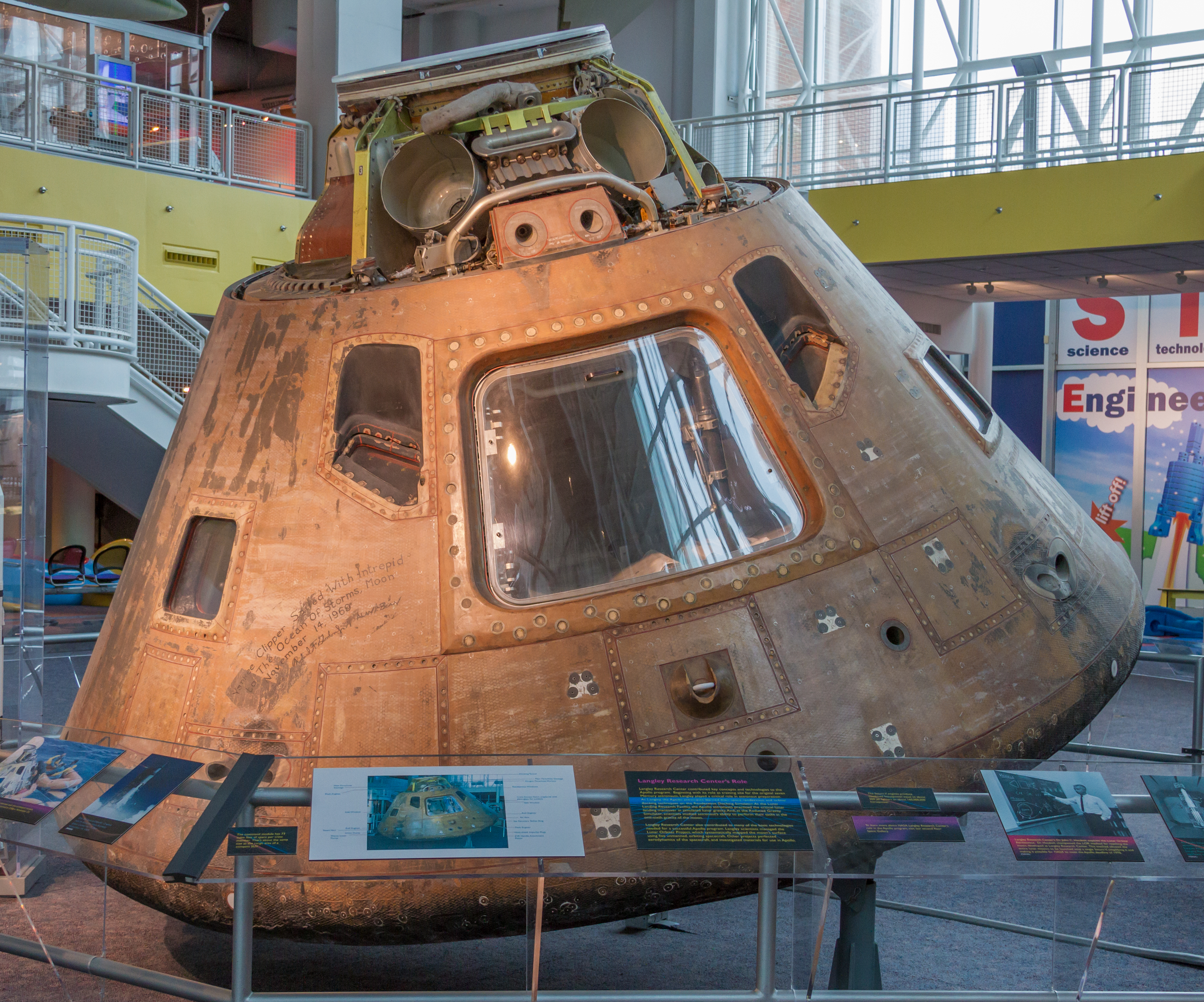
The Apollo 12 Command Module Yankee Clipper

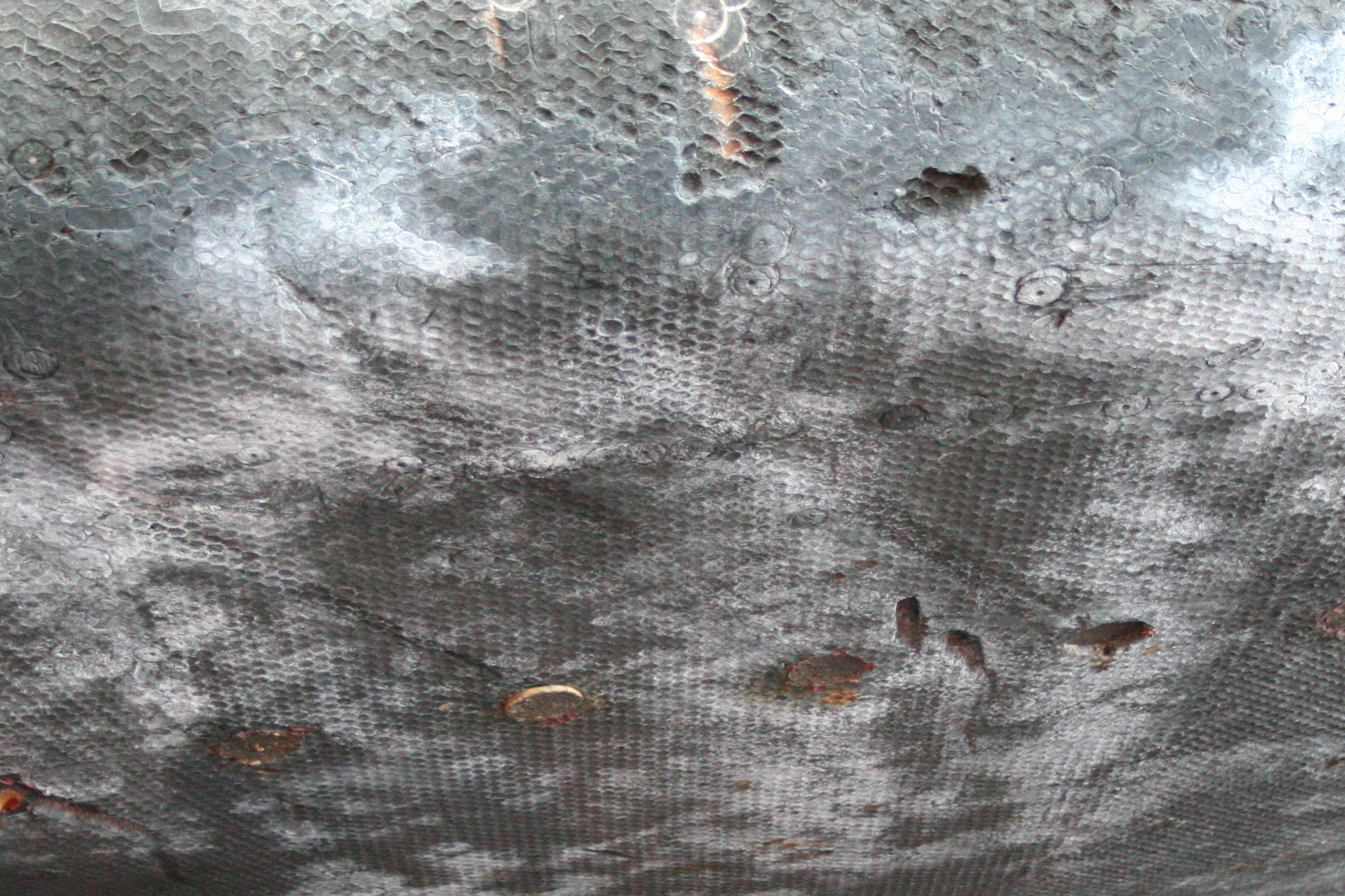
Detail of Apollo 12 heat shield

Visitors enter through a room which simulates a crewed launch to Mars, telling the story of a rendezvous with a Mars Transit Vehicle and arrival at the planet where doors open up into the gallery.

- Apollo 12 Command Module Yankee Clipper, which completed 45 lunar orbits in 1969
- Apollo Lunar Excursion Module Simulator (LEMS), suspended by a huge gantry and used by astronauts at the Langley Research Center to practice landing on the lunar surface
- Viking Lander full-scale replica
- Gemini 10 hatch
- Mercury XIV spacecraft
- Sounding rockets similar to those launched at NASA's Wallops Flight Facility 90 miles north.
- Lunar Orbiter full-scale replica
- Rocks from Mars and the Moon
- Lunar Landing simulator

== Space Quest ==
Visitors can experience the hands-on space gallery, "Space Quest: Exploring the Moon, Mars & Beyond," presented by Langley Federal Credit Union. This gallery includes four different exhibits; Our Solar System, Living and Working in Space, Mars and the Moon, and Visions of Space Exploration.

=== Our Solar System ===
This permanent exhibit focuses on the planets within the Solar System and showcases planetary models in an array of sizes. Saturn, Jupiter, Uranus, and Neptune hang high above the second-floor, nearly 30 feet high. These four models are the largest in the country to be displayed inside a museum or science center. Jupiter, the largest of the models, weighs more than 750 pounds, has a diameter of 10 feet, and hangs approximately 22 feet in the air. Saturn is eight-and-a-half feet in diameter and weighs 450 pounds, with an additional 495 pounds of rings encircling the planet's body. Hanging more than 30 feet high, Saturn floats above Uranus and Neptune, which each weigh around 65 pounds. The models are composed of heavy-duty Styrofoam which is painted to resemble each of the planets. The Solar System is completed with smaller models of Earth, Mars, Venus, and Mercury mounted at the visitor's level. Created to be a scale model system, Earth is about the size as a soccer ball and Mercury the size of a baseball.

== IMAX Theater ==
Out of 447 IMAX theaters worldwide and 256 in the US, the Riverside IMAX 3D Theater, is the first institutional theater in the world to have an IMAX Digital.

== See also ==
- Air Power Park
- Buckroe Beach Carousel
- List of aerospace museums
