= Hampton Institute Creative Dance Group =

Dance company in Hampton, Virginia

General information
- Name: Hampton Institute Creative Dance Group
- Year founded: 1934
- Founding artistic director: Charles Holston Williams
- Principal venue: Hampton University

The Hampton Institute Creative Dance Group or Creative Dance Group of Hampton, now known as the Terpsichorean Dance Company, was formed in Hampton, Virginia in the 1930s under the direction of Charles Holston Williams.

== History ==
Founded in 1934, the Hampton Institute Creative Dance Group was a dance troupe of 35 students from the historically Black Hampton Institute (now Hampton University). Charles Holston Williams, director of physical education at the institute, founded and directed the dance group to support modern dance for Black dancers. Serving as an extension of the school's physical education, the group was inspired by Williams' experience watching Ted Shawn's all-male company in 1933. In 1934, the Hampton Creative Dance Group included one of Shawn's dances in their repertoire. Williams and Bernice Miller Smothers were responsible for composing and teaching the dances. Williams' assistant and co-director Charlotte Moton Hubbard also worked closely with the group as their mentor.

== Performances ==
Williams organized the first African American touring dance company in the United States. On April 2, 1934, they performed at Ogden Hall on the campus of Hampton Institute, and later in New York City on November 21, 1934. Richmond, Virginia's Mosque Theater also hosted an early performance of the ensemble.

The Hampton Creative Dance Group appeared at Bryn Mawr College's Goodhart Hall in Pennsylvania on November 9, 1937. New York's Lafayette Theatre featured a performance by the Hampton campus group on November 14, 1937.

Following a successful East Coast tour, they returned in May 1939. On March 14, 1939, they gave a performance on stage at the institute's Ogden Hall. Their Southern tour began in December 1940, with their first performance at Raleigh, North Carolina's Memorial Auditorium. The tour date was featured in The Crisis.

For Booker T. Washington's induction into the Hall of Fame for Great Americans on May 23, 1946, the group staged a dramatic pantomime about his life.

== Name change ==
In 1968, the name was changed to The Terpsichorean Dance Company by student vote. The name relates to Terpsichore, the muse of dance.

== Notable members ==
- Vera Embree
- Frank O. Roberts

== See also ==
- Charles Holston Williams
- Hampton University
