= Maceo W. Hubbard =

Maceo William Hubbard (died July 17, 1991) was a lawyer who worked to advance civil rights in the United States.

== Education ==
He graduated from Lincoln University, and Harvard University Law School in 1926.

== Career ==
He served with the U.S. Justice Department for 40 years. W. E. B. Du Bois wrote to him seeking a record of testimony and soliciting Hubbard to write an article.

== Death ==
Hubbard died July 17, 1991, at the age of 92. His wife was Charlotte Moton Hubbard.
