= Uncle Jack Dey =

American artist (1912–1978)

John William Dey
- Born: November 11, 1912; Phoebus, Virginia, United States
- Died: October 10, 1978 (aged 65); Richmond, Virginia, United States
- Known for: Painting

John William "Uncle Jack" Dey (November 11, 1912 – October 10, 1978) was an American self-taught artist who lived and worked primarily in Virginia. Before he began painting, he worked as a trapper, fisherman, lumberjack, barber, and police officer. Dey was a favorite among the neighborhood children, whose toys and bicycles he fixed, and they affectionately nicknamed him "Uncle Jack".

== Biography ==
John William Dey was born in Phoebus, Virginia. His parents separated when he was 11 years old, and he took on a series of odd jobs to help his family. He dropped out high school and later moved to Maine with a friend where he worked as a trapper and lumberjack. After his stay in Maine, Dey worked his way back south and settled in Richmond, Virginia, where he studied to be a barber. There, he met Margaret Pearl Cleveland, whom he later married. Dey became a police officer for the City of Richmond around 1942 and retired in 1955. Dey died of cardiopulmonary arrest in 1978.

== Painting career ==
Despite having no formal artistic training, Dey began painting in 1955 after his retirement from the police force. He preferred to use model airplane paint and painted on wood, plywood, and corrugated cardboard, which he sometimes covered with an old t-shirt. Dey purchased frames from yard sales and second-hand shops and then created paintings according to each frame's size. His subjects include country landscapes, Biblical stories, and imagined, exotic scenes, some inspired by his own memories. Each painting had a story, and Dey attached letters to the back of some of his paintings, explaining what the story was. Dey's doctor and friends were some of his earliest supporters and he gave away 300–400 of his paintings before he was recognized as an artist. It is estimated that he created around 650 paintings.

In 1973, the American Folk Art Company in Richmond, Virginia, held Dey's first public paintings exhibition and more widespread recognition came in the next year when folk art collector Herbert Waide Hemphill, Jr. included an image of Adam and Even Leave Eden in his book, Twentieth-Century American Folk Art and Artists. Several of Dey's works, including Adam and Eve Leave Eden, The Elephant Who Was Fond of the Watermelon, and Acupuncture Pitchfork Style, are included in the Smithsonian American Art Museum.
