= William Randall (baseball) =

American baseball player (1915-2013)

- Outfielder
- Born: August 5, 1915; Phoebus, Virginia, U.S.
- Died: February 13, 2013 (aged 97); Columbia, Maryland, U.S.
- Batted: Left Threw: Right

Negro leagues debut
- 1942, for the Homestead Grays

Negro leagues statistics
- Batting average: .500

Teams
- Washington Homestead Grays (1942) (1946)

William Talton "Sonny" Randall (August 5, 1915 – February 13, 2013) was an American professional baseball player during the 1940s. Randall played during the segregated era when black baseball players were not allowed to play in either Major League Baseball or any of its minor league affiliates. Randall was born in Phoebus, Virginia, in 1915. As a young man, he moved with his family to Washington, D.C. in the early 1920s and subsequently dropped out of school to support his family during the depression.

During the 1930s, Randall played on Washington D.C area sandlot and semi-pro teams to include the Washington Indians, Black Sox, and Aztecs. During the war years, Randall played on the U.S. Navy's Great Lakes Training Center's baseball team, the "Blue Jackets." When he returned home, Randall would occasionally play for the Washington Homestead Grays but because he did not want to endure the hardships of travel that were common in the Negro leagues, Randall declined opportunities to play professionally. As a result, almost all of Randall's time with the Grays was during their home games. Randall did occasionally travel with the semi-pro teams he played for and experienced racial discrimination and racial taunts from fans.

Teams were segregated and so were the towns. The players couldn't eat in any of the restaurants because they were for whites only. There were no black hotels ... and the players often had to change into their uniforms on the bus or even in the woods. During the Navy years we played a team from Waukegan, Illinois. A player from the all-white team called one of the Negro players the "n" word and the two teams almost got into a fight. After the incident, the coach of the Navy team, who was white, talked to both sides. When we went back to play that team a couple of months later, the problem had been resolved and there was no incident.

During Randall's time as a ball player, he was also a federal employee, working for the Navy and NASA for 31 years. After his retirement from federal service, Randall worked as a chauffeur for U.S. Senators Milton Young, Howard Baker, and Ted Stevens as well as for various Washington D.C. area law firms. Randall permanently retired in 2001 after working for more than 70 years. Randall was a longtime resident of Temple Hills, Maryland, where he lived with his wife of 55 years, Ann Turner Randall, of Clarksville, Maryland. Randall died on February 13, 2013, after suffering complications from a stroke.
