= Contraband (American Civil War) =

Freed slaves working with the Union

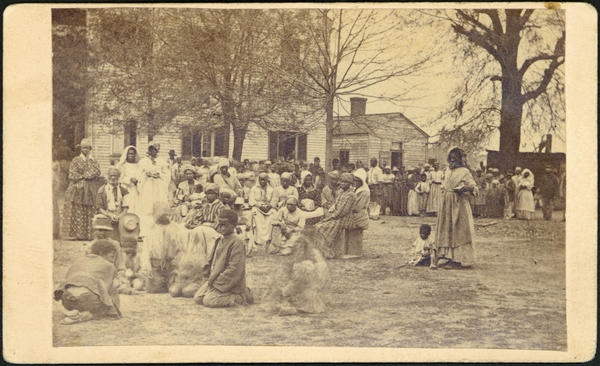
Contraband camp, Baton Rouge, circa 1863, buildings formerly used as a Female Seminary; image ascribed to McPherson & Oliver (LSU Libraries item 13940009r)

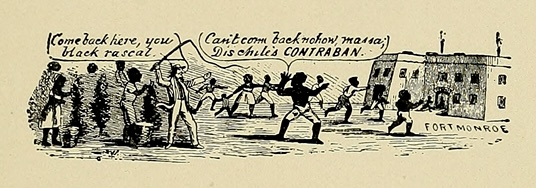
A version of the "Fort Monroe Doctrine" cartoon that was drawn on an envelope, reprinted in History of the 19th Century in Caricature (1904)

"Contraband" was a term commonly used in the United States Military during the American Civil War to describe a new status of people who had escaped slavery, often those who affiliated with Union forces. In August 1861, the Union Army and the US Congress determined that the US would no longer return people who escaped slavery who went to Union lines, but they would be classified as "contraband of war," or captured enemy property. They used many as laborers to support Union efforts, and soon began to pay them wages. This policy also became known as Fort Monroe Doctrine.

These self-emancipated freedmen set up camps near Union forces, often with army assistance and supervision. The army helped to support and educate both adults and children among the refugees. Thousands of men from these camps enlisted in the United States Colored Troops when recruitment started in 1863.

One particular contraband camp, which had 6,000 "runaway negroes", was in Natchez, Mississippi, and was visited by General Ulysses S. Grant with some of his family and staff in 1863.

By the end of the war, more than two hundred fifty Contraband camps were operating in the Southern United States, including the Freedmen's Colony of Roanoke Island, North Carolina. In Roanoke Island, approximately 3,500 formerly enslaved people worked to develop a self-sufficient community.

Contraband refugee camps have been described as "simultaneously humanitarian crises and incubators for a new relationship between African Americans and the U.S. government."

== History ==
The status of Confederate-owned slaves became an issue early in 1861, not long after hostilities began in the American Civil War. Fort Monroe, in Hampton Roads, Virginia, was a major Union stronghold which never fell to the Confederate States of America, despite its close proximity to their capital city, Richmond. On May 24, 1861, three men, Frank Baker, Shepard Mallory, and James Townsend, escaped enslavement by crossing Hampton Roads harbor at night from the Confederate-occupied Norfolk County, Virginia, and seeking refuge in Fort Monroe. Enslaved men in Virginia were being forced by the Confederacy to help construct an artillery battery at Sewell's Point, aimed at Fort Monroe. The Commander of Fort Monroe, Major General Benjamin Butler, refused to return Baker, Malloy, and Townsend to their owners' agent who requested their return.

Prior to the War, the owners of the enslaved would have been legally entitled to request their return (as property) under the federal Fugitive Slave Act of 1850. But Virginia had declared, by secession, that it was no longer part of the United States. General Butler, who was an attorney, took the position that, if Virginia now claimed to be a foreign country, then the Fugitive Slave Act did not apply, and he was under no obligation to return the three men; he would hold them as "contraband of war". Additionally, under the precedents of the laws of war, "all the property of the enemy may be seized". Although Butler doubted "whether there may be a property in human beings", the question of whether the men could rightfully be considered "property" was irrelevant, as it was also legitimate under the laws of war to deprive the enemy of their labor. Butler sent a letter to Washington asking for his decision to be approved, and further asking for permission to also refuse the return of escaped women and children, even though they could not plausibly be retained on the basis of military necessity.

Although there was not yet any official Union policy regarding slavery in the seceded states, President Abraham Lincoln had, prior to the war, warned the southern states that if they seceded they would forfeit any protection slavery was afforded by the Constitution. Following a cabinet meeting on May 30, Lincoln had Simon Cameron, the secretary of war, telegraph Butler to inform him that his contraband policy was approved.

=== Use of the term ===
As early as 1812, the term contraband was used in general language to refer to illegally smuggled goods (including enslaved people). However its use was given a new context during the American Civil War after Butler's decision.

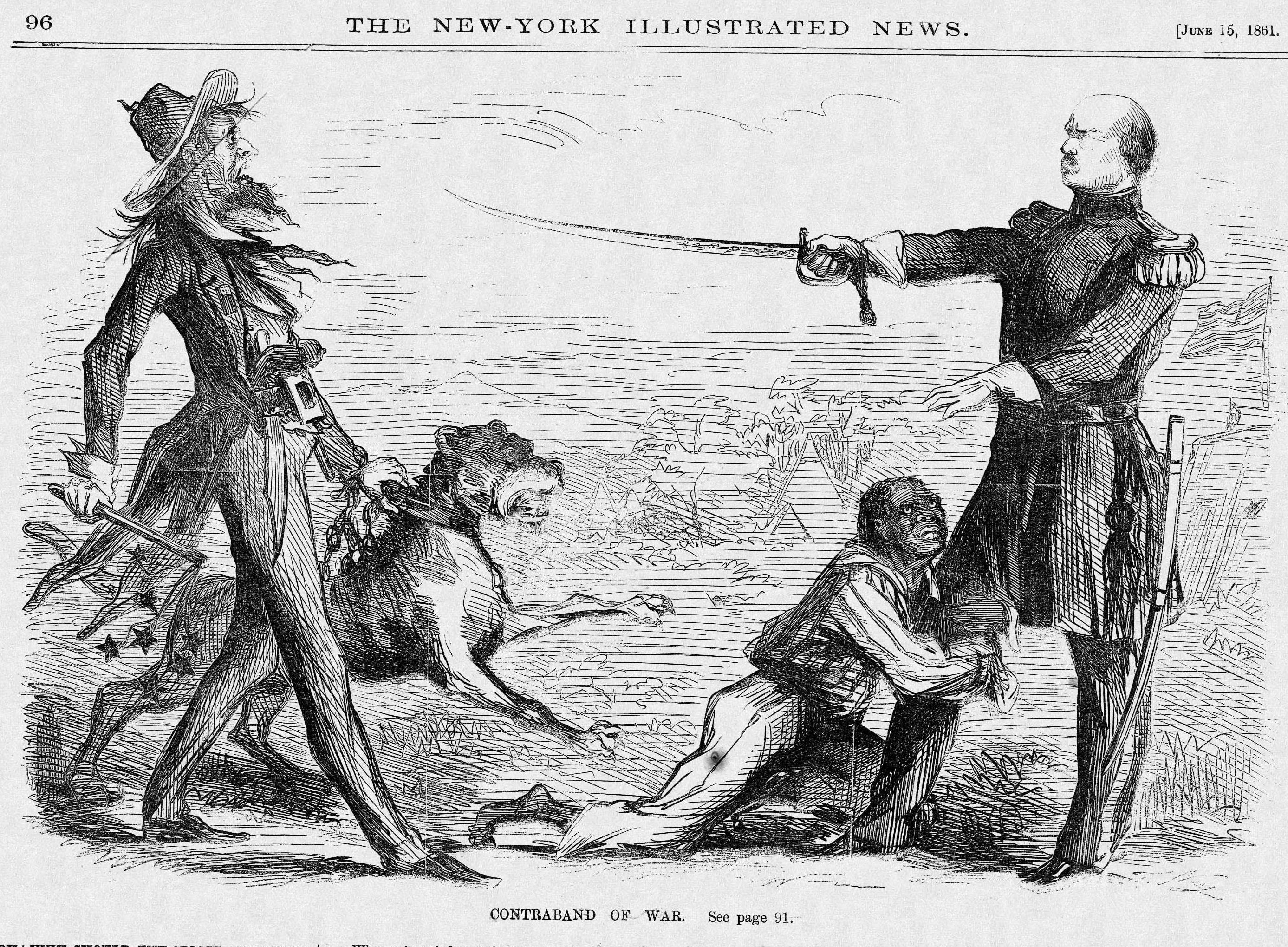
"Contraband of War" by Thomas Nast, New York Illustrated News, June 15, 1861, p. 96

One of the first uses of the term by the press is Thomas Nast's illustration "Contraband of War" published in the New York Illustrated News, June 15, 1861. General Butler is depicted with "contraband" clutching his leg while holding the "Southern villain" at bay.

General Butler's written statements and communications with the War Department requesting guidance on the issue of fugitive slaves did not use the term "contraband." As late as August 9, 1861, he used the term "slaves" for fugitives who had come to Fort Monroe. Gen. Butler did not pay these men wages for work that they began to undertake, and he continued to refer to them as "slaves." On August 10, 1861, Acting Master William Budd of the gunboat USS Resolute first used the term in an official US military record. On September 25, 1861, the Secretary of the Navy Gideon Welles issued a directive to give "persons of color, commonly known as contrabands", in the employment of the Union Navy pay at the rate of $10 per month and a full day's ration. Three weeks later, the Union Army followed suit, paying male "contrabands" at Fort Monroe $8 a month and females $4, specific to that command.

In August, the US Congress passed the Confiscation Act of 1861, which declared that any property used by the Confederate military, including enslaved people, could be confiscated by Union forces. The next March, its Act Prohibiting the Return of Slaves forbade returning enslaved persons to Confederate enslavers, whether private citizens or the Confederate military. On January 1, 1863 the Emancipation Proclamation permanently freed "all persons held as slaves within any State, or designated part of a State, the people whereof shall then be in rebellion against the United States shall be then, thenceforward, and forever free". All contrabands were freed by the proclamation, though for most people enslaved under Confederate control, full emancipation did not take place until the Thirteenth Amendment to the United States Constitution, which abolished slavery except as punishment for a crime, was ratified on December 6, 1865.

== Grand Contraband Camp ==
The word of Butler's policy spread quickly among enslaved communities in southeastern Virginia. While becoming a "contraband" did not mean full freedom, many people living under slavery considered it a step in that direction. The day after Butler's decision, many more people emancipated themselves by escaping and finding their way to Fort Monroe and where they appealed to become "contraband". As the number of formerly enslaved people grew too large to be housed inside the Fort, the contrabands built housing outside the crowded base. The first was Camp Hamilton, a military encampment just outside the walls of the fort. A larger encampment was built in the ruins of the City of Hampton (which had been burned by Confederate troops after learning of the plan to house the contrabands there). They called their new settlement the Grand Contraband Camp. It gained the nickname "Slabtown" due to being built from the remnants of Hampton. Conflicts arose when Union troops evicted the contrabands so that they could be quartered in the camp, and when black men living there were systematically forced to join the Union Army.

By the end of the war in April 1865, less than four years later, an estimated 10,000 people escaped slavery and applied to gain "contraband" status, with many living nearby. According to National Humanities Center, "Of the many slaves who ran away between the American Revolution and the Civil War, perhaps 100,000 reached freedom." Across the South, Union forces managed more than 100 contraband camps, although not all were as large. The 1,500 contrabands behind federal lines at Harpers Ferry were kidnapped and re-enslaved when Confederates took the town. From a camp on Roanoke Island that started in 1862, Horace James developed the Freedmen's Colony of Roanoke Island (1863–1867). Appointed by the Union Army, James was a Congregational chaplain who, with the freedmen, tried to create a self-sustaining colony at the island.

=== Education Efforts ===
Within the Grand Contraband Camp, the pioneering teacher Mary S. Peake began to teach both adult and child contrabands to read and write. She was the first Black teacher hired by the American Missionary Association, which also sent numerous Northern white teachers across the South to teach newly emancipated Black people both during the Civil War and in the Reconstruction era. The area where Peake taught in Elizabeth City County later became part of the campus of Hampton University, a historically black college. Defying a Virginia law against educating slaves, Peake and other teachers held classes outdoors under a large oak tree. In 1863, President Abraham Lincoln's Emancipation Proclamation was read to the contrabands and free blacks there, for which the tree was named the Emancipation Oak.

By 1863, a total of four schools had been set up in the Camp by the American Missionary Association, including one at the former home of disgraced President John Tyler.

== Development of other Contraband Camps ==
Contraband camps developed around many Union-held forts and encampments. In 1863, after the Emancipation Proclamation and authorization of black military units, thousands of free black people began to enlist in the United States Colored Troops. The Army allowed their families to take refuge at contraband camps. The black troops ultimately comprised nearly ten percent of all the troops in the Union Army.

By the end of the war, more than one hundred contraband camps had been developed in the South. Many were assisted by missionary teachers recruited from the North by the American Missionary Association and other groups who, together with free blacks and freedmen, agreed that education of the formerly enslaved people was of the highest priority. The teachers often wrote about the desire of freed people, both adults and children, for education.

A unique view of a temporary contraband camp, in this case located in the town square of Opelousas, Louisiana from April to May 10, 1863, appears in a report submitted to Louisiana's Confederate governor Henry W. Allen and published 1865. The account was written by a Confederate officer from St. Landry Parish, most likely Gen. John G. Pratt:

The accomplished officer who presided over the scenes daily enacted in this barracoon was the "Military Governor of Opelousas," Col. Chickering, of the 41st Massachusetts regiment, who occupied the most conspicuous residence, fronting the entrance of the church. From his eligible position he had, as from the royal box at the opera, the most comprehensive view of the scenes passing beneath. Morning and evening, as he promenaded his spacious gallery, in all the glitter of military button and strap, he passed in review the living panorama before him, which was to furnish such valuable acquisitions to the confiscated plantations on the Lafourche and the coast. The scenes which he so complacently surveyed will long live in the memory of the then inhabitants of the town. In one place groups of human beings, with melancholy faces, were crouched on the earth around some decaying embers; in another, men, women and children were moving in some African dance to the discordant chant of a hundred voices; in another, crowds were reclining in listless idleness on the ground, in every attitude that betrays the vacant mind; in another, half clad men and women were feasting and rioting amidst peals and shouts of unearthly merriments; in another, awkward field hands, grotesquely dressed, were being taken through the exercises of squad drill and the manual of arms, while in the midst of all these scenes blue-coated officers and men were seen in amorous dalliance with the colored Aspasias of the town, exhibiting, in their degradation, a contempt for the commonest decencies of life. Nor was the spectacle less humiliating in the church. From its sacred chancel a half-crazy negro, with the voice of a Stentor and the fire of Peter the Hermit, declaimed in a barbaric jargon to an auditory whose appreciation was manifested in wild shouts and screams. The declamation of the preacher, in which the name of God was connected with ideas of heathen superstition, seemed to light up in the minds of his hearers the dormant spark of African barbarism which had smouldered for generations.

== Gallery ==
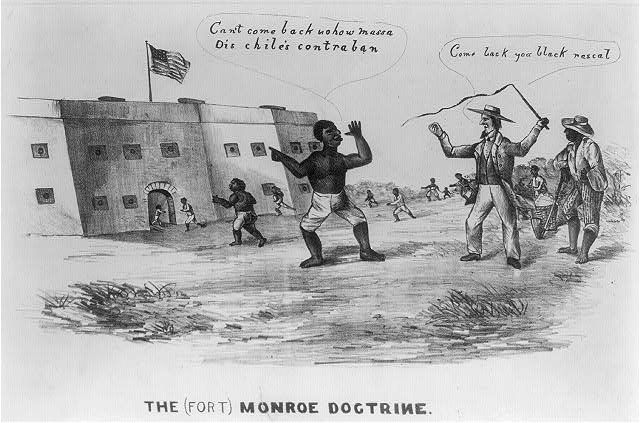
A contemporary cartoon showing slaves escaping to Fort Monroe after Gen. Butler's decree that all slaves behind Union lines would be protected. The policy was called the "Fort Monroe Doctrine", alluding to Butler's headquarters at the Fort.

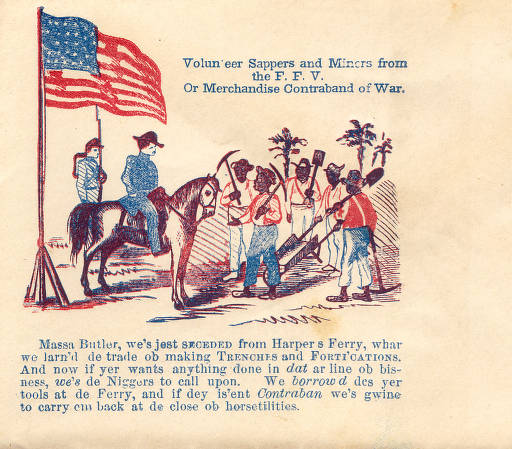
Envelope showing contrabands (escaped slaves) speaking with Union General Butler.

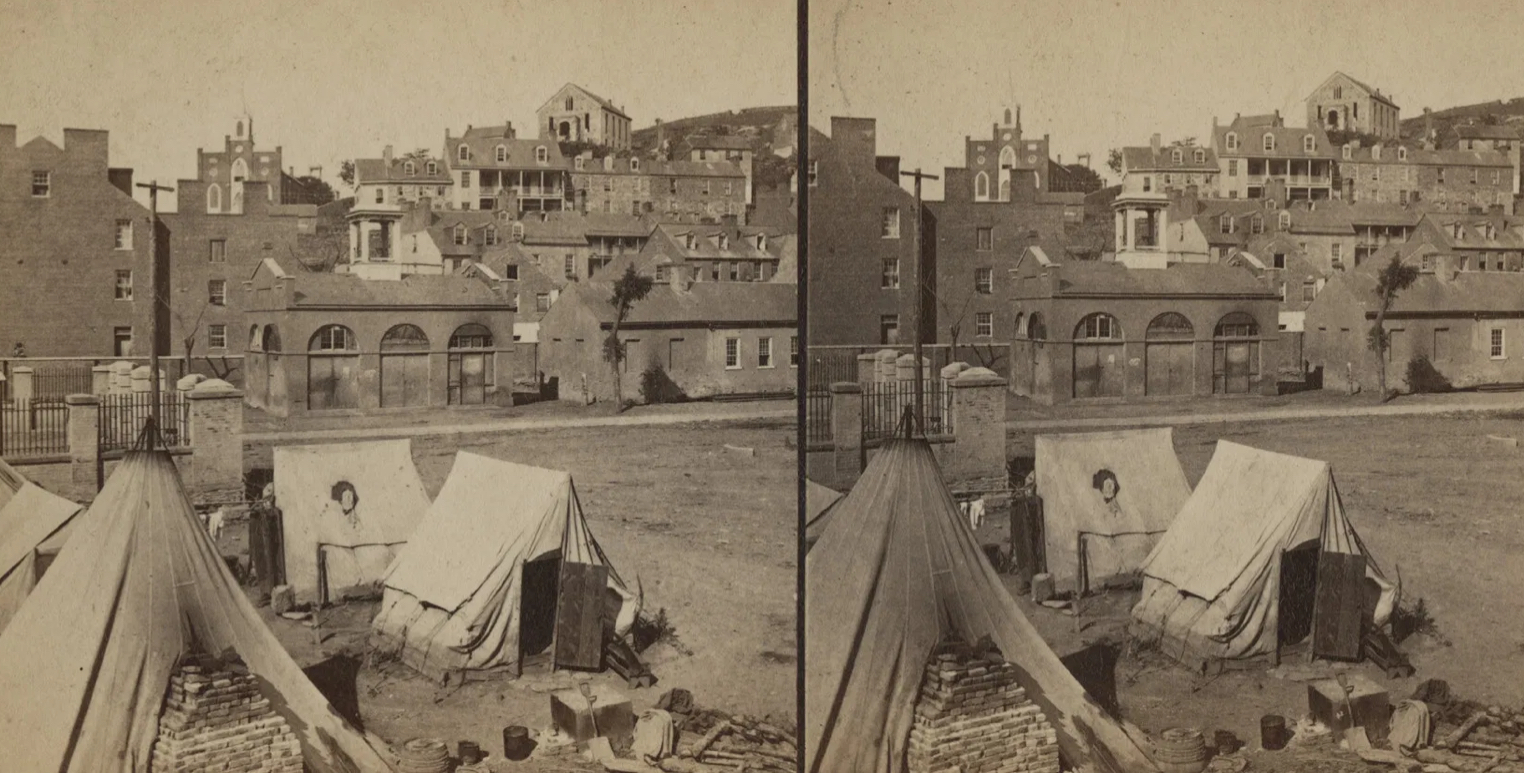
Contraband camp at Harpers Ferry, Virginia (now West Virginia), about 1861. Note John Brown's Fort in background.

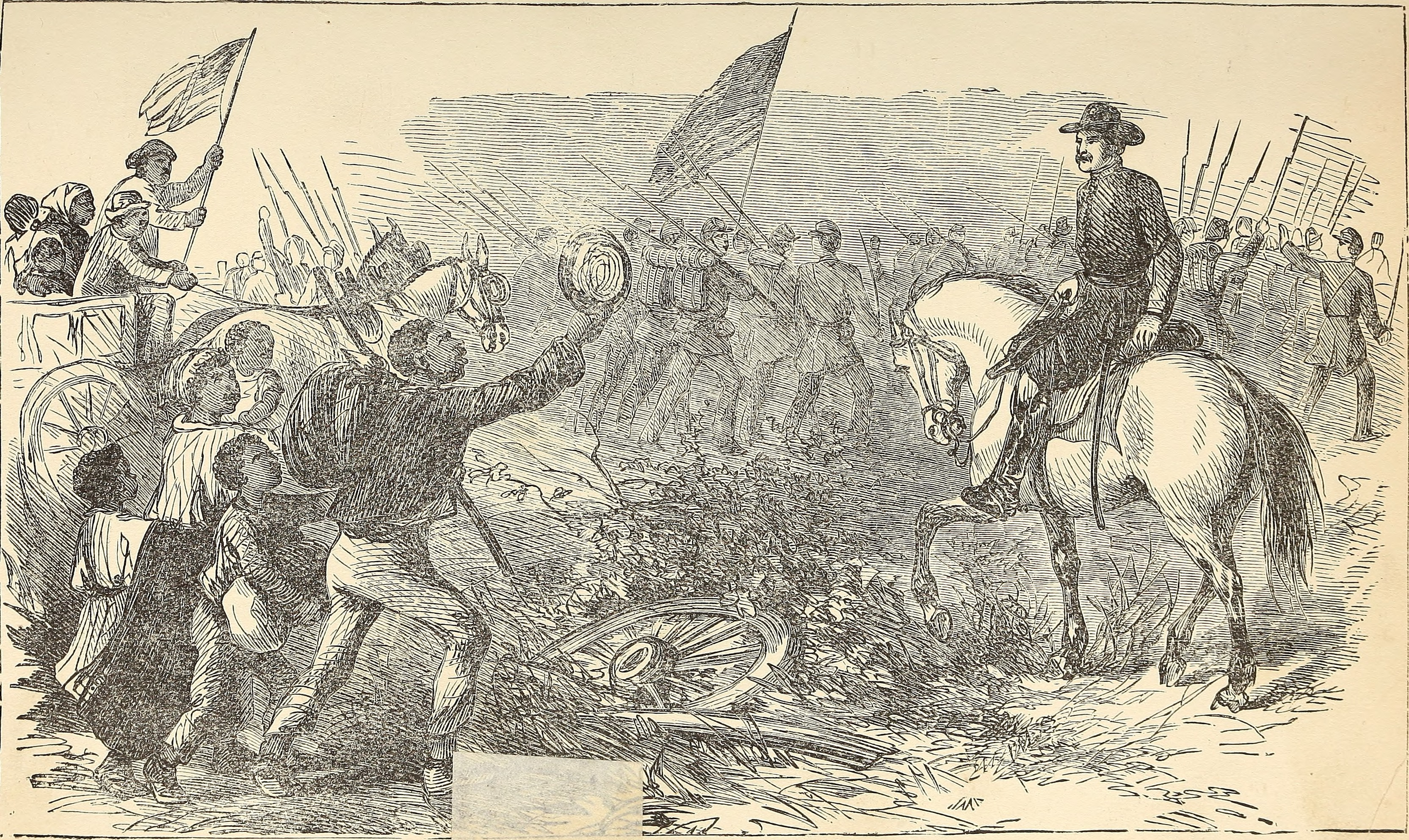
Escaped slaves meeting Union troops, 1862.

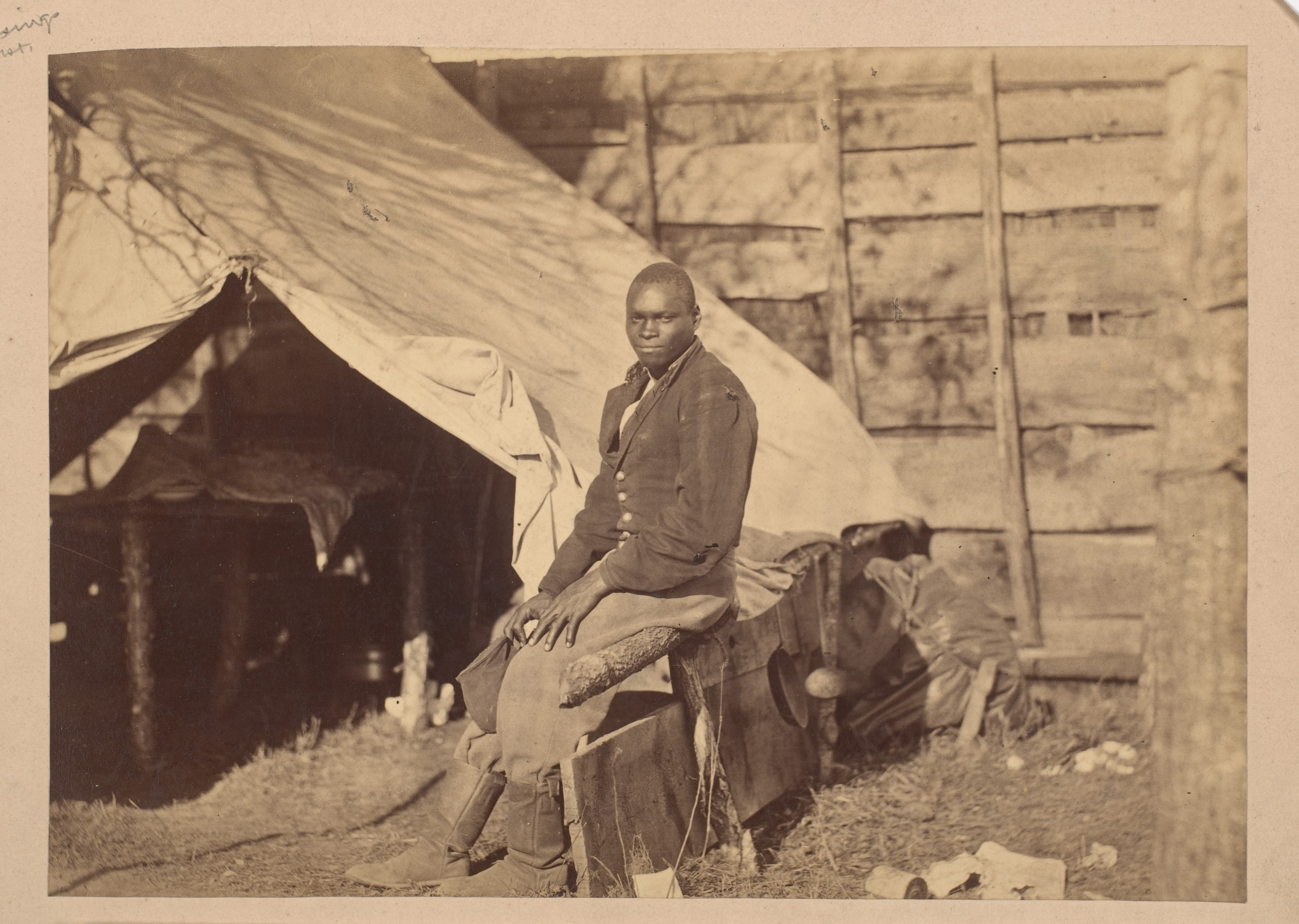
Photograph taken about 1862 of a contraband servant named John Henry in a Union Army Camp.

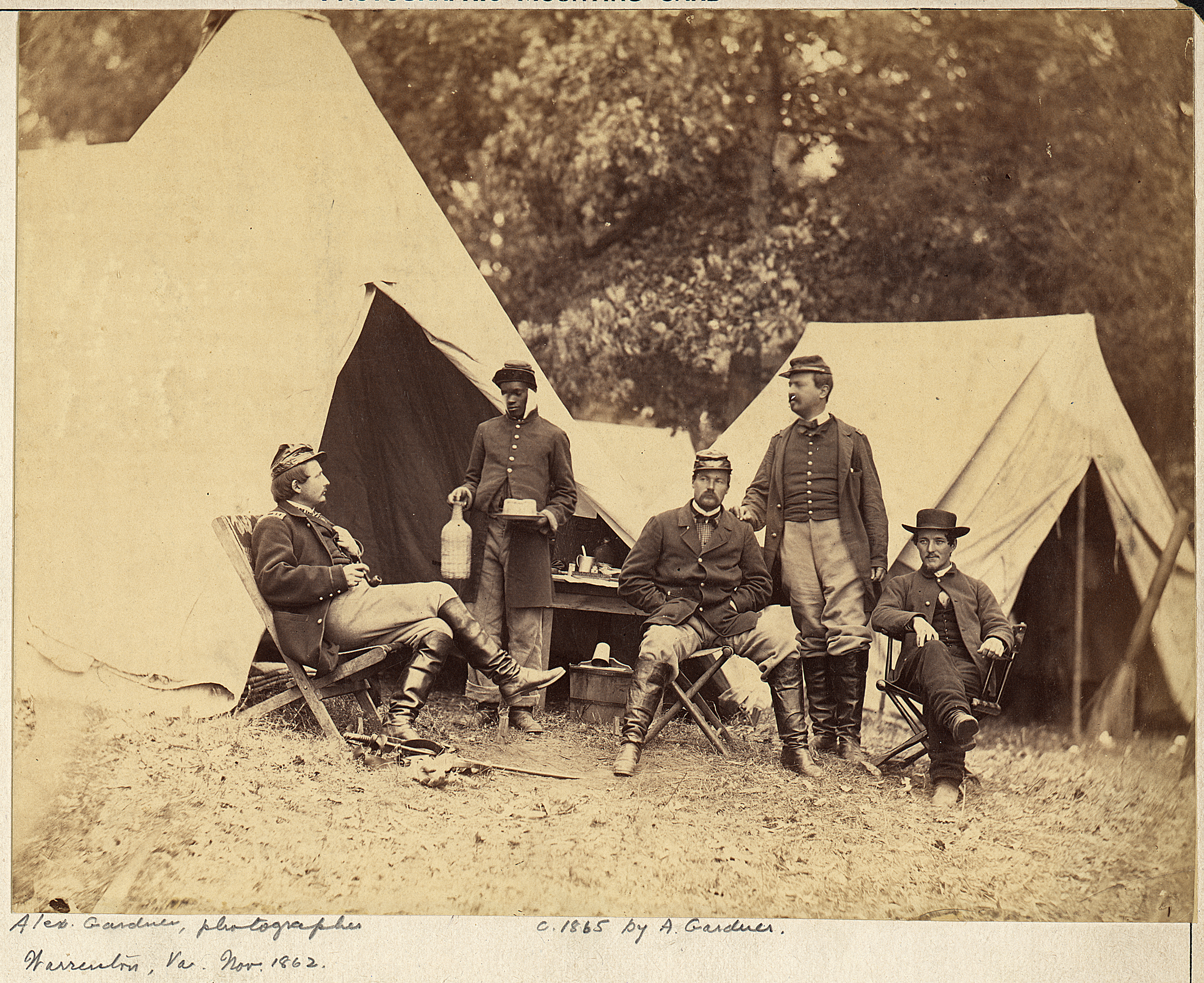
Photo entitled: "What do I want, John Henry"?, Warrenton, Virginia, 1862, showing 2nd from left John Henry and 4 Union officers.

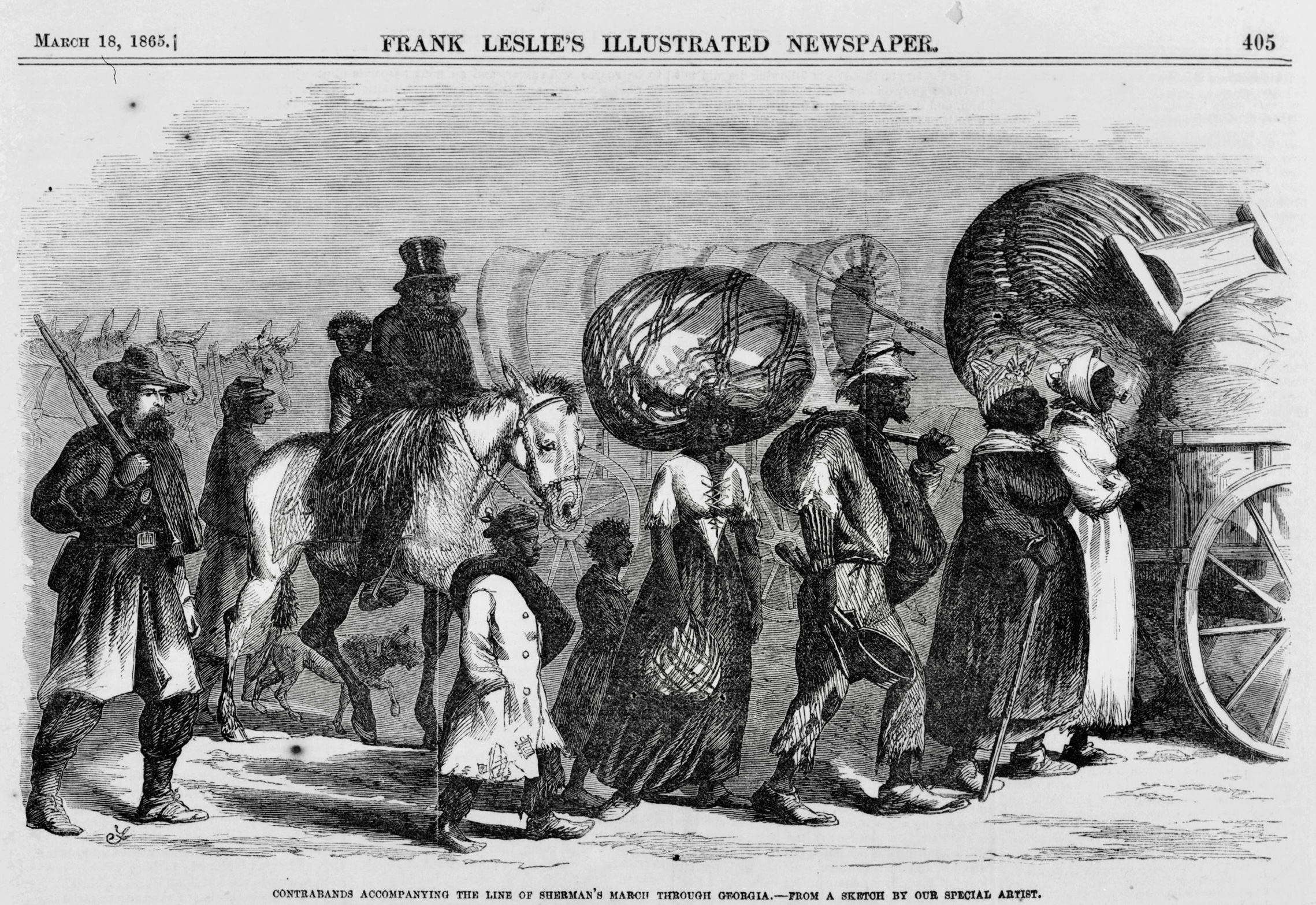
Frank Leslie's Illustrated News - Contrabands accompanying the line of Sherman's march through Georgia

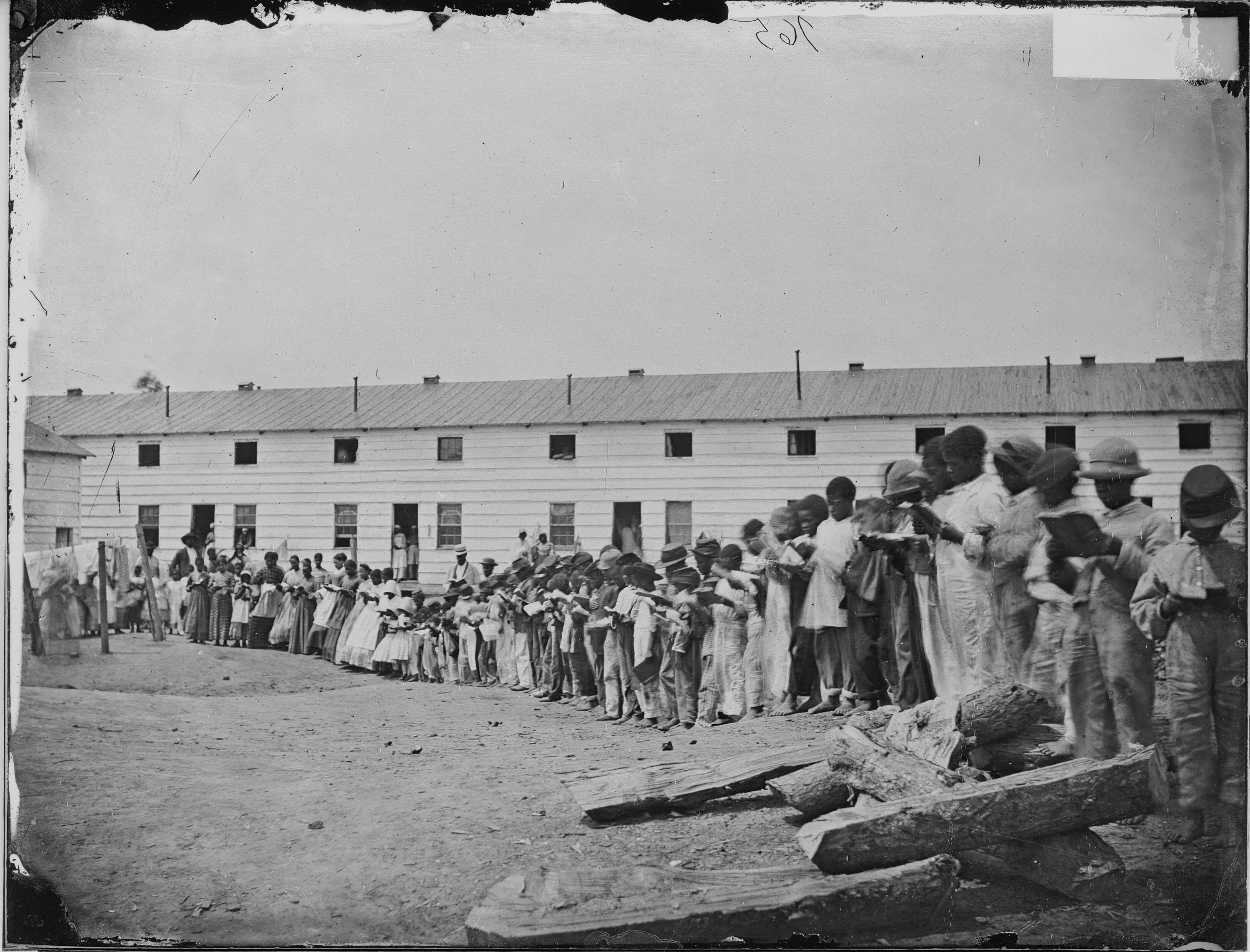
A contraband school, held outdoors at Freedman's Village in Arlington County, Virginia. Note teacher, in coat and tie, on mound at left.

== See also ==
- "Oh! Let My People Go"
- American Missionary Association
- Mary S. Peake
- Port Royal Experiment
