= Jennie B. Moton =

American educator and clubwoman

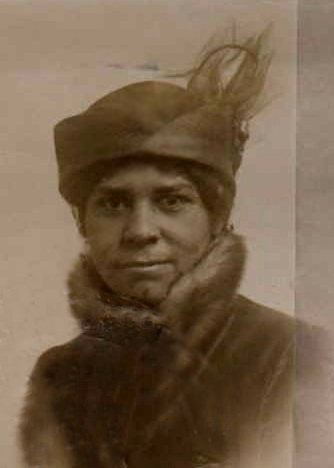
- Born: Jennie Dee Booth; February 24, 1879; Roanes, Virginia
- Died: December 23, 1942 (aged 63); Hampton, Virginia
- Resting place: Hampton Institute
- Education: Hampton Institute
- Known for: Clubwoman, Agricultural field officer
- Spouse: Robert R. Moton
- Children: 5, including Charlotte Moton Hubbard

Jennie B. Moton (1879-1942) was an American educator and clubwoman. As a special field agent for the Agricultural Adjustment Administration (AAA) in the 1930s and 40s, she worked to improve the lives of rural African Americans in the South. She directed the department of Women's Industries at the Tuskegee Institute, presided over the Tuskegee Woman's Club, and was a two-term president of the National Association of Colored Women (NACW).

In 1941, she was one of several influential Black leaders who helped persuade President Franklin D. Roosevelt to sign Executive Order 8802.

== Early life and education ==
Jennie Dee Booth was one of twelve siblings born to Robert and Ellen Booth. Her father was a farmer and oysterer; both of her parents were multiracial. She graduated from the Hampton Institute in Virginia in 1900.

== Career ==
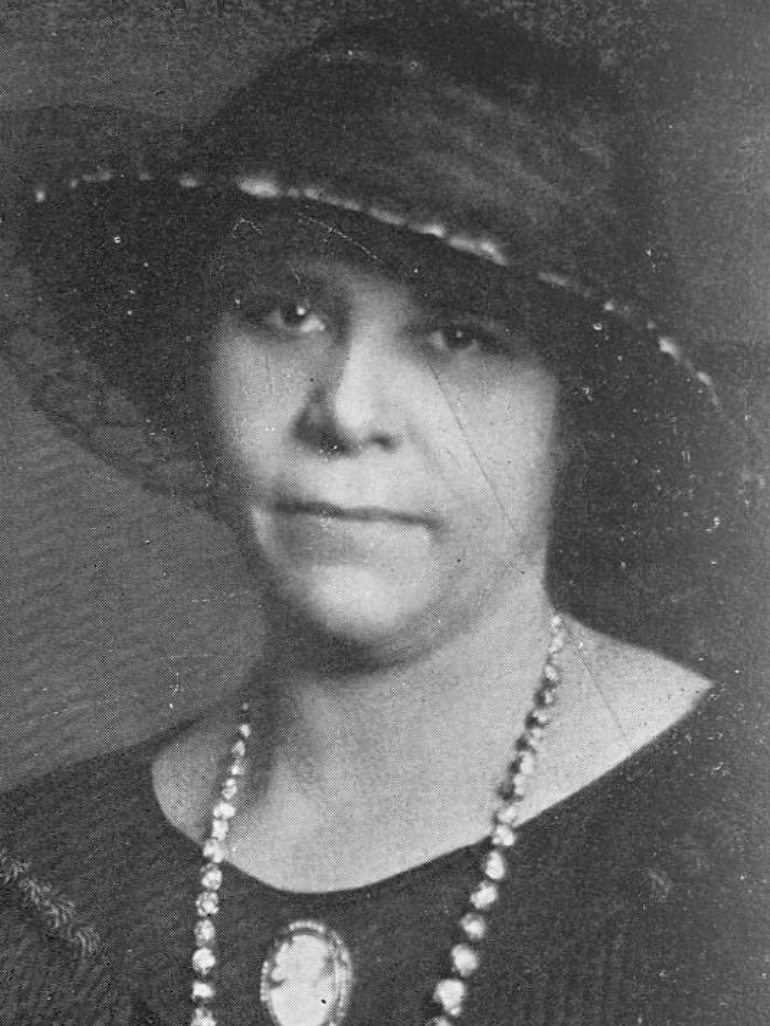
Jennie B. Moton, from the 1929 yearbook of Tuskegee Institute

After graduating from college, she taught for eight years at the Hampton Institute's Whittier Training School, where students practiced pedagogy.

=== Tuskegee Institute ===
She married Robert Russa Moton on July 1, 1908; the couple had five children, including Charlotte Moton Hubbard (born in 1911) who went on to become the first Black woman to serve as deputy assistant secretary of state in the United States. Robert Moton went on to succeed Booker T. Washington as principal of the Tuskegee Institute in Alabama in 1915. As the principal's wife, Jennie Moton devoted much of her time to the Institute; historian Janet Sims-Wood calls her "the driving force behind her husband." As vice-president of the Tuskegee Woman's Club, she became close friends with the widowed Margaret M. Washington, who stayed on as club president.

In 1920, Moton was one of the speakers at a conference of the Commission on Interracial Cooperation in Memphis, Tennessee, along with Washington, Elizabeth Ross Haynes, and Charlotte Hawkins Brown. Lugenia Burns Hope also contributed to the drafts. Addressing a white audience, the women offered their perspective on topics such as child welfare, suffrage, education, protection of Black girls, and the eradication of lynching. In 1924, Moton was elected to the executive board of the Southern Interracial Committee.

After Washington's death, Moton took on her duties as club president. From 1924 to 1935 she also directed the Department of Women's Industries, which employed 20 teachers.

=== Women's club movement ===
Moton served as president of the Alabama Association of Women's Clubs (AAWC) from 1929 to 1936. Under her leadership, the AAWC organized charitable fundraisers, voter registration drives, youth programs, a war bond program, and efforts to combat tuberculosis. She hosted the AAWC's 1934 conference at the Tuskegee Institute; noted educator and activist Nannie Helen Burroughs was among the speakers. Moton served for a time as chairperson of the Board of Trustees for the Nannie Helen Burroughs Training School for Women and Girls.

Moton succeeded Mary Fitzbutler Waring as the 11th president of the NACWC in 1937. While serving as president, Moton met Mary McLeod Bethune, former 8th president of the NACWC who, as a member of Franklin D. Roosevelt's "Black Cabinet," had the ear of the president. In 1941, Moton, Bethune, and A. Philip Randolph helped persuade Roosevelt to sign Executive Order 8802, which prohibited discrimination in the defense industries based on "race, creed, color or national origin." A few weeks later, Bethune was one of the speakers at the NACWC biennial conference in Oklahoma City, along with educator, activist, and 7th NACWC President Hallie Q. Brown.

=== Government service ===
From 1936 to 1942 she worked for the Agricultural Adjustment Administration (AAA), a federal agency that paid farmers to reduce their production of cotton and tobacco. She was one of three Black special field agents appointed by Cully Cobb to travel the deep South, keeping home agents apprised of program guidelines and getting Black farmers interested in the program. In 1933, the Agricultural Adjustment Act had had the unintended effect of displacing thousands of tenant farmers and sharecroppers in the South without any compensation; it was later ruled unconstitutional, and the law was replaced with the Soil Conservation and Domestic Allotment Act of 1936. Moton's special task was "to contact Negro farm women in the Southern region in order to get their viewpoint" on the program as well as providing them with information. She often met up with women at women's clubs and at Sunday church services.

== Later years ==
Moton remained active in community affairs until the end of her life. During her final years she served as a member of the Margaret Murray Washington Memorial Foundation, and in 1942 was appointed a home nursing consultant for the National Red Cross. She was also a race relations advisor for the U.S. Division of Physical Fitness in Philadelphia.

Moton died in Hampton, Virginia, on December 23, 1942. She was buried alongside her husband on the grounds of the Hampton Institute.

== Honors and awards ==
- Honorary Master of Arts degree, Bennett College, 1931
- Hall of Fame, Montgomery Federation of Women, 1941
