= Emancipation Oak =

Coordinates: 37.023163°N 76.330374°W

- U.S. National Register of Historic Places
- U.S. Historic district – Contributing property
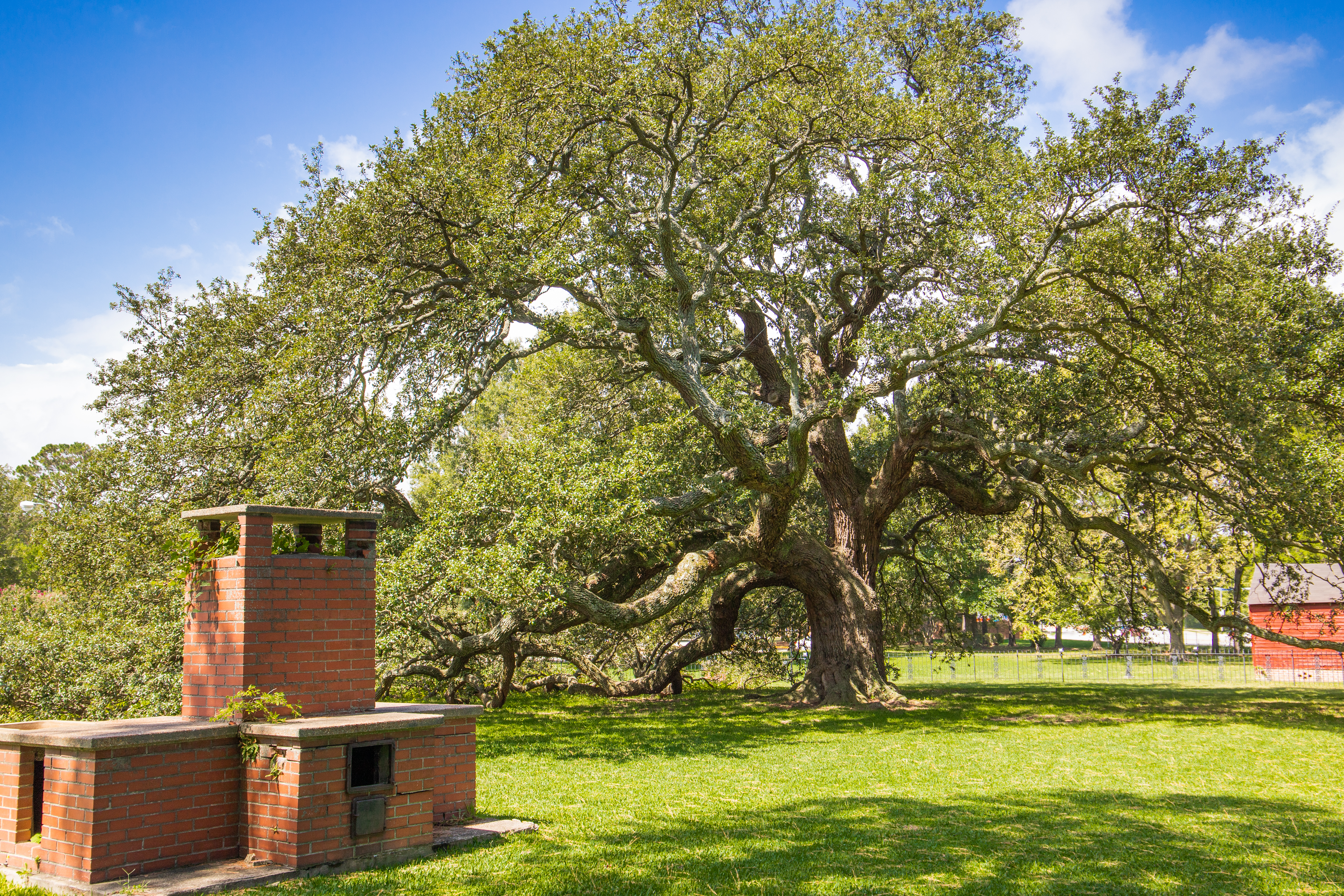
- Emancipation Oak in September 2019

- Location within Virginia
- Location: Hampton University
- Part of: Hampton Institute
- NRHP reference No.: 69000323
- Added to NRHP: November 12, 1969

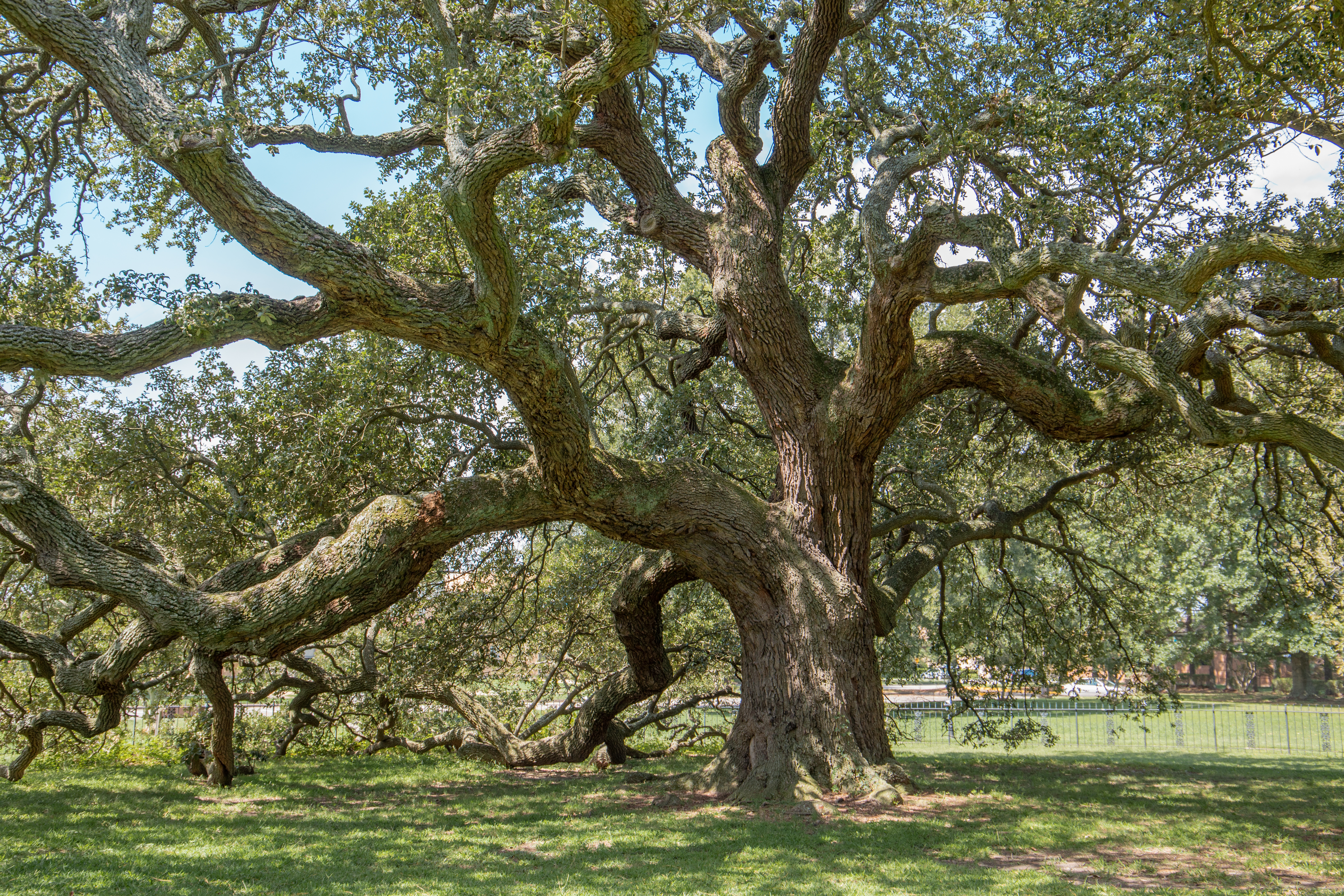
The canopy of Emancipation Oak

Emancipation Oak is a historic tree on the campus of Hampton University in Hampton, Virginia, in the United States. The large, sprawling southern live oak (Quercus virginiana), believed to be over 200 years old, is 98 feet (30 m) in diameter, with branches which extend upward as well as laterally. It is part of the National Historic Landmark district of Hampton University.

== History ==
During the American Civil War, Fort Monroe became a place of refuge for African American people escaping slavery. The United States Army defined the formerly enslaved people as "contraband of war" to legally provide them asylum. Virginia law had banned the education of enslaved people following Nat Turner's Rebellion in 1831.

In November 1861, the American Missionary Association (AMA) asked Mary S. Peake to teach children of freedmen at the Grand Contraband Camp, Virginia. (Jones-Wilson et al., 1996). She was said to start her classes outside, under the tree. Peake was the first black teacher of the AMA, which expanded to support numerous educational institutions in the South. Peake's base was 3 miles from the protective safety of Fort Monroe, but her classes also attracted adults at night. Soon the AMA provided the Brown Cottage for her classes. She taught up to 50 children during the day and 20 adults at night.

In 1863, the Virginia Peninsula's black community gathered under the oak to hear the first reading of President Abraham Lincoln's Emancipation Proclamation in the Southern United States, leading to its nickname as the Emancipation Oak.

After the conclusion of the war, General Samuel C. Armstrong and the American Missionary Association founded Hampton Normal and Agricultural Institute there in 1868. From 1872 to 1875, one of its many students was Booker T. Washington, the son of a freedman. Washington became a famous educator who founded Alabama's Tuskegee Institute in 1881. In the early 20th century, collaborating with the philanthropist Julius Rosenwald, Washington and staff at the Tuskegee Institute helped to establish dozens of rural schools for African-American children across the Southern United States.

Hampton Normal and Agricultural Institute became Hampton Institute in 1930. It gained university status in 1984, becoming Hampton University. It is one of Virginia's major institutions of higher education. In the 21st century, the Emancipation Oak still provides shelter and inspiration to the school's students and staff.

== See also ==
- 140th Year Anniversary Celebration of the Emancipation Proclamation
- Mary Smith Peake
- List of individual trees
