= Robert Russa Moton =

American educator and author (1867–1940)

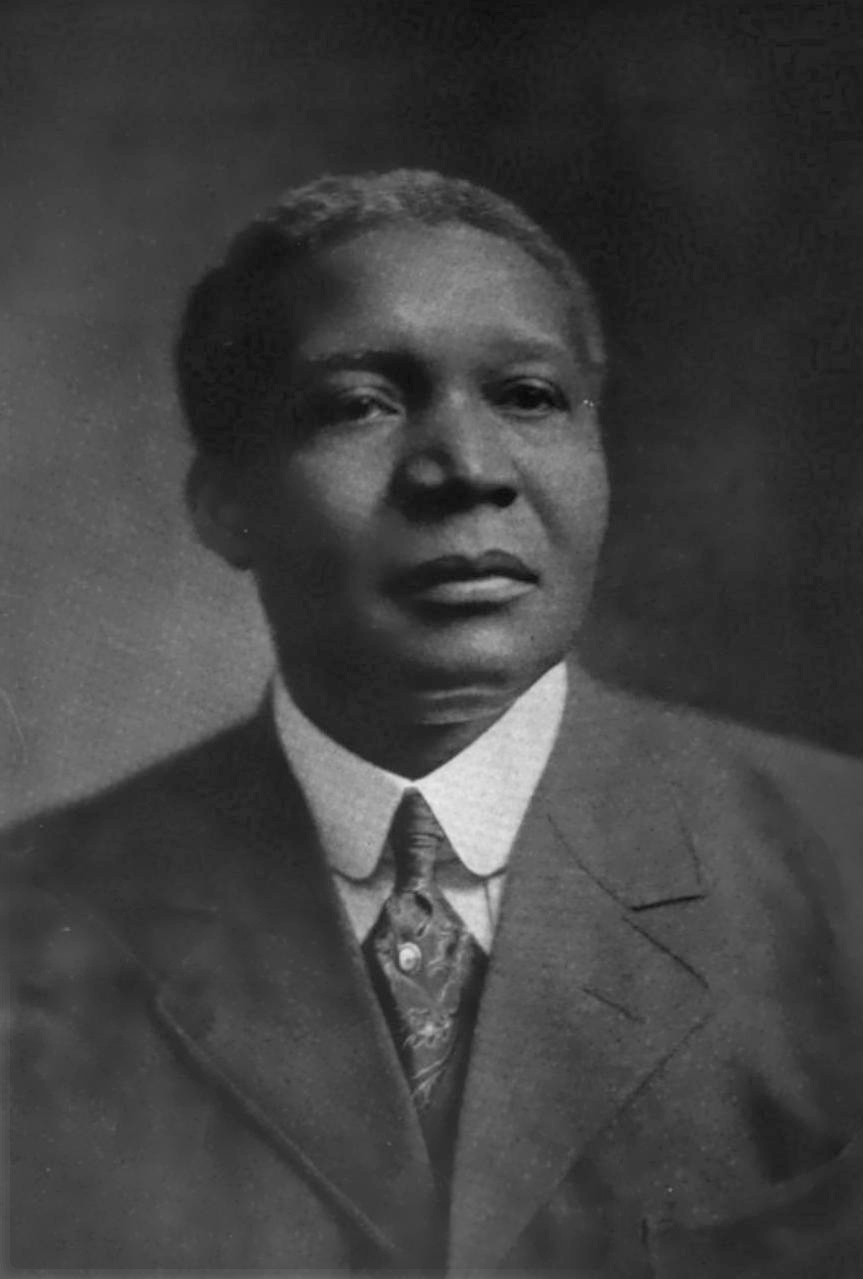
- Robert Moton in 1916
- Born: August 26, 1867; Amelia County, Virginia, U.S.
- Died: May 31, 1940 (aged 72); Holly Knoll, Gloucester County, Virginia, U.S.
- Education: Hampton Institute, Tuskegee Institute
- Organization(s): Fellowship of Reconciliation, Congress of Racial Equality, War Resisters League, Southern Christian Leadership Conference, Social Democrats, USA (National Chairman), A. Philip Randolph Institute (President), Committee on the Present Danger
- Political party: Democratic (after 1932)
- Other political affiliations: Republican (before 1932)
- Movement: Civil Rights Movement, Peace Movement, Socialism
- Spouses: Elizabeth Hunt Harris (m. 1905–1906); Jennie Dee Booth (m. 1908)
- Children: 3, including Charlotte Moton (Hubbard)
- Awards: Spingarn Medal from the NAACP

Robert Russa Moton (August 26, 1867 – May 31, 1940) was an American educator and author. He served as an administrator at Hampton Institute. In 1915 he was named principal of Tuskegee Institute, after the death of founder Booker T. Washington, a position he held for 20 years until retirement in 1935. He authored several books including an autobiography. He held various administrative positions with the U.S. government.

== Early life ==
Robert Russa Moton was born in Amelia County, Virginia, on August 26, 1867, and was raised in nearby Rice, Prince Edward County, Virginia. He was the grandson of an African chieftain, who had grown wealthy by engaging in slave trading. Later this chief was himself sold into slavery, leading to the establishment of Moton's family in the Americas shortly thereafter.

Moton graduated from the Hampton Institute in 1890.

== Personal life ==
He married Elizabeth Hunt Harris in 1905, but she died in 1906. He married his second wife, Jennie Dee Booth, in 1908. They had three daughters together: Charlotte Moton (Hubbard), who became a deputy assistant secretary of state at the State Department under President Lyndon B. Johnson; Catherine Moton (Patterson); and Jennie Moton (Taylor). All three married and had families.

== Career ==
In 1891, Moton was appointed commandant of the male student cadet corps at Hampton Institute, equivalent to Dean of Men, serving in this position for more than a decade. He was informally known as the "Major".

In 1915, after the death of Booker T. Washington, Moton succeeded Washington as the second principal of the Tuskegee Institute. While supporting the work-study program, he emphasized education, integrating liberal arts into the curriculum, establishing Bachelor of Science degrees in agriculture and education. He improved courses of study, especially in teacher training, elevated the quality of the faculty and administration, constructed new facilities, and significantly increased the endowment by maintaining his connections to wealthy white benefactors in the North.

== U.S. government service ==
During World War I, Moton traveled to Europe on behalf of president Woodrow Wilson. His duty was to investigate the condition of the African-American soldiers. He often witnessed discriminatory practices.

== Writings and speaking career ==
Moton wrote a number of books while he served as principal. He attended the First Pan-African Congress in Paris in 1919, meeting other educators and activists from around the world.

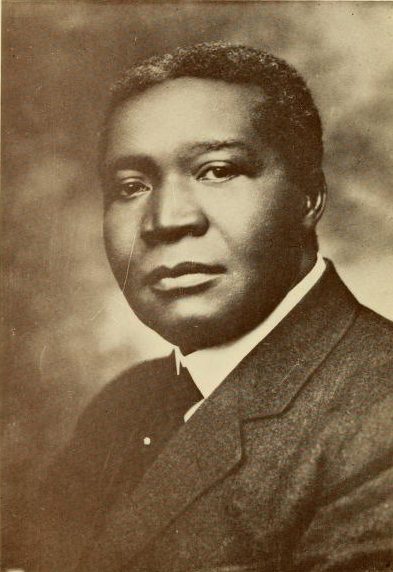
Moton, c. 1922

In 1922, he was the keynote speaker at the dedication of the Lincoln Memorial, closing with "I... believe that all of us, black and white, both North and South, are going to strive on to finish the work which [Lincoln] so nobly began to make America an example for the world of equal justice and equal opportunity for all who strive and are willing to serve under the flag that makes men free." Speaking outdoors to a segregated crowd, Dr. Moton was not allowed to sit with the other speakers who were white.

== Advocacy ==
In race relations, Moton advocated accommodation, not confrontation. He firmly believed that the best way to advance the cause of African Americans was to convince white people of black people's worth through their exemplary behavior. Never one to rock the boat, he didn't fight segregation or challenge white authority.

Moton sat on the boards of major philanthropic organizations with the likes of Andrew Carnegie and John D. Rockefeller Jr., and his influence was considerable. When Julius Rosenwald, president of Sears, Roebuck and Company, provided the funding to build more than 6,000 "Rosenwald" schools for rural Southern African Americans, Moton's skills were clearly in play behind the scenes.

In 1927 the Great Mississippi Flood of 1927 devastated the Delta. With the Mississippi flood waters covering the entire Delta, the Greenville, Mississippi levee was the only high, safe place for thousands of refugees. The vast majority of the people stranded on the levee were African Americans, and they were desperate for food, potable drinking water and shelter. Instead of evacuating them, African Americans were virtually imprisoned on the levee and forced to work at gunpoint. The conditions in the Greenville camp were the worst of any refugee site.

To avoid a scandal that would threaten Herbert Hoover's presidential ambitions, Hoover's friends urged him to get what they called "the big Negroes" in the Republican Party to quiet his critics, and Hoover turned to Robert Moton for the job. Hoover formed the Colored Advisory Commission, led by Moton and staffed by prominent African Americans, to investigate the allegations of abuses in the flood area.

The commission conducted a thorough investigation and reported back to Moton on the deplorable conditions. Moton presented the findings to Hoover, and advocated immediate improvements to aid the flood's neediest victims. But the information was never made public. Hoover had asked Moton to keep a tight lid on his investigation. In return, Hoover implied that if he were successful in his bid for the presidency, Moton and his people would play a role in his administration unprecedented in the nation's history. Hoover also hinted that as president he intended to divide the land of bankrupt planters into small African-American-owned farms.

Motivated by Hoover's promises, Moton saw to it that the Colored Advisory Commission never revealed the full extent of the abuses in the Delta, and Moton championed Hoover's candidacy to the African-American population. However, once elected president in 1928, Hoover ignored Robert Moton and the promises he had made to his black constituency. In the following election of 1932, Moton withdrew his support for Hoover and switched to the Democratic Party.

Moton was a member of the Gamma Sigma graduate chapter of Phi Beta Sigma fraternity, along with George Washington Carver.

== Retirement ==
Moton went on to retire from Tuskegee in 1935 and died at his home Holly Knoll, in Gloucester County, Virginia, in 1940 at the age of 72 where he was buried at the Hampton Institute. Tuskegee Institute named the field where Airmen trained during World War I after Robert Moton, in honor of everything he did for the institute.

== Legacy and honors ==
- The Tuskegee syphilis experiment, one of the most infamous biomedical research studies in U.S. history, began while Moton headed Tuskegee Institute. A clinical study conducted between 1932 and 1972 in Macon County, Alabama, by the U.S. Public Health Service, it became notorious for ethical issues, as it failed to tell participants their diagnosis and did not treat them, even after penicillin was proven in the 1940s to be effective against syphilis. The study followed the natural progression of untreated syphilis in poor, rural black men who thought they were receiving free health care from the U.S. government.
- Moton endorsed the study and provided institutional resources, including medical personnel. The study was finally shut down in 1972 amid ethical controversy. The victims of the study included numerous men who died of syphilis, 40 wives who contracted the disease, and 19 children born with congenital syphilis.
- Moton Field, the initial training base for the Tuskegee Airmen during World War II, was named after him. Moton had died the year before the Army commenced formal training of African-American military pilots at Tuskegee Institute. But under his leadership, the school had established a commitment to aeronautical training with facilities, engineering, and technical instructors. These resources were a factor in Tuskegee Institute's participation in the Civilian Pilot Training Program, a nationwide endeavor which eventually led to the training of African-American pilots at Tuskegee.
- Holly Knoll, his retirement home in Gloucester County, has been known as the Robert R. Moton House and was designated as a U.S. National Historic Landmark in 1981.
- The former R. R. Moton High School, located in Farmville in Prince Edward County, was designated a U.S. National Historic Landmark in 1998. It now houses the Robert Russa Moton Museum, a center for the study of civil rights in education.
- Robert R. Moton High Schools located in Leeds, Alabama, and Sycamore, Alabama, both of which operated from 1948–1970, were named in his honor.
- Elementary schools have been named for him in Hampton, VA, Brooksville, FL, Miami, FL, Westminster, MD, Easton, MD, Emporia, VA and New Orleans, LA.
- In 1932, Moton was awarded the Spingarn Medal from the NAACP.
- Moton Hall, a men's dorm built in the late 1950s at Hampton University, is named for him.

== Public service ==
Moton played a role in various aspects of public service.

- 1918, he traveled to France at the request of President Woodrow Wilson to inspect U.S. black troops stationed there.
- 1923, he played a leading role in the establishment of the Veterans Administration Hospital for Negroes, Tuskegee, Alabama.
- 1927, Chairman of the American National Red Cross, Colored Advisory Commission on the Great Mississippi Flood.
- 1932, Chairman of the U.S. Commission on Education in Haiti.

== Publications ==
- — (April 1907). "The Negro's Uphill Climb: The Life-Story of a Ladder of the Colored Race I: Ancestry and Struggle for Education". The World's Work: A History of Our Time. XIII: 8738–8743.
- — (May 1907). "A Negro's Uphill Climb II: Student Life at Hampton Institute". The World's Work: A History of Our Time. XIV: 8915–8918.
- — (August 1907). "A Negro's Uphill Climb III: Concluded". The World's Work: A History of Our Time. XIV: 9198–9201.
- Some Elements Necessary To Race Development, 1913.
- Racial Good Will Addresses, 1916.
- Negro of Today: Remarkable Growth Of Fifty Years, 1921.
- — (September 14, 1921). "An Inter-Racial Commission At Work". The Outlook. 129: 59–61.
- The Negro's Debt to Lincoln (8 pp.), 1922.
- Frissell the Builder: Address at the Dedication of the Frissell Memorial Organ in Ogden Hall, Hampton Institute, 1923.
- Finding A Way Out (autobiography). Garden City, N.Y.: Doubleday, Page & Co, 1920. ISBN 0-8371-1897-2
- What the Negro Thinks. Garden City, N.Y.: Doubleday, Doran & Co., 1929.
