= Buckroe Beach Carousel =

- U.S. National Register of Historic Places
- Virginia Landmarks Register
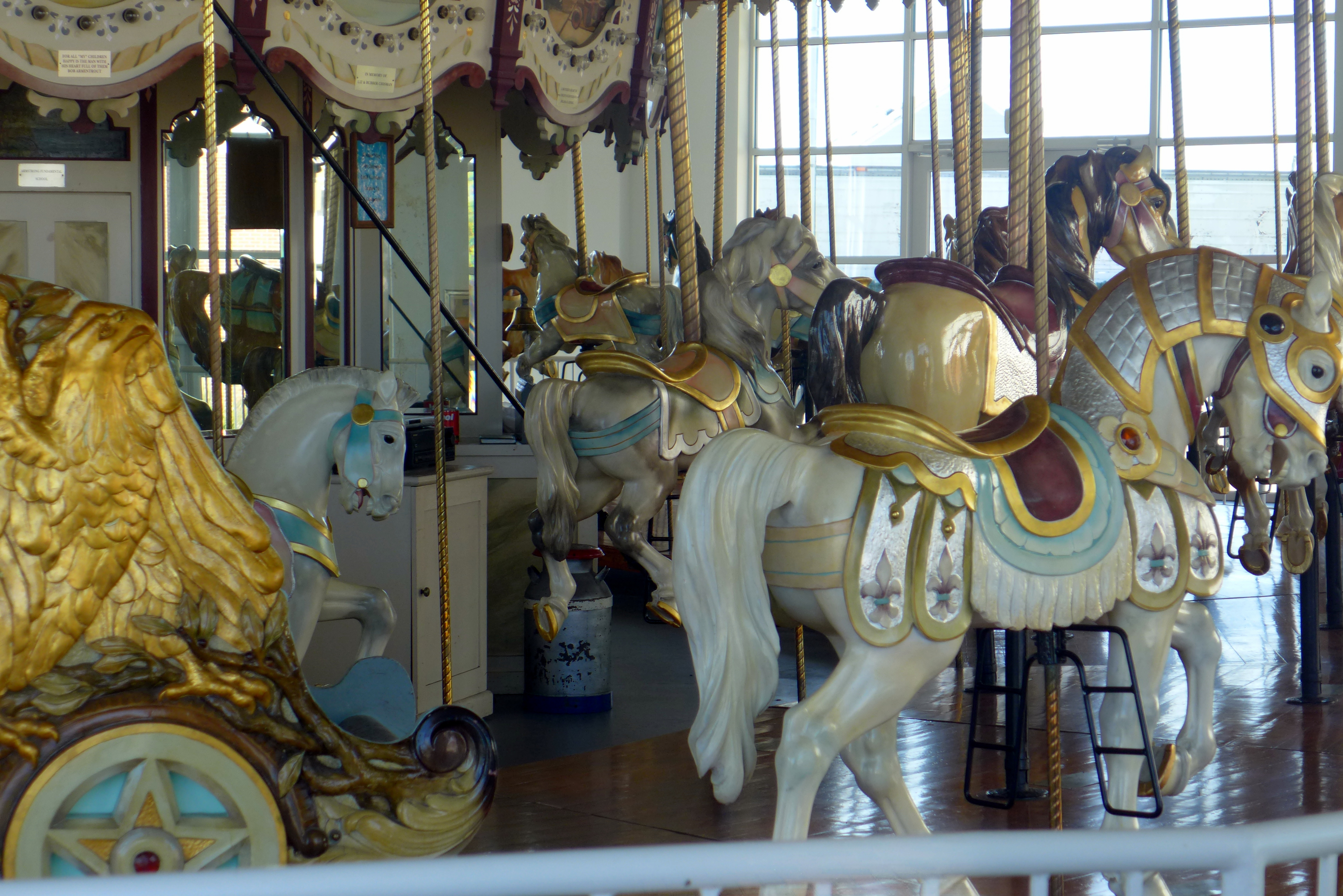
- Buckroe Beach Carousel, September 2013

- Location within Virginia Location within the United States
- Location: 602 Settlers Landing Road, Hampton, Virginia
- Coordinates: 37°1′26″N 76°20′38″W
- Area: less than one acre
- Built: 1920
- Built by: Philadelphia Toboggan Company
- Architectural style: Carousel
- NRHP reference No.: 92001396
- VLR No.: 114-0111

Significant dates
- Added to NRHP: October 27, 1992
- Designated VLR: February 28, 1992

Buckroe Beach Carousel, also known as Philadelphia Toboggan Company Number Fifty and the Hampton Carousel, is a historic carousel operated by the Hampton History Museum in Hampton, Virginia. It was built by the Philadelphia Toboggan Company and installed at Buckroe Beach in 1920. It measures 45 feet in diameter and the platform consists of 18 sections. It has 42 oil paintings; 30 mirrors; a 1914 Bruder band organ that plays 66 key B.A.B. rolls, 48 hand-carved wooden horses placed three abreast; and two upholstered, hand-carved wooden chariots. It was disassembled in 1985 when the Buckroe Beach Amusement Park closed. It was restored between 1988 and 1991 by R&F Designs of Bristol, CT, and was installed that year in its present location in Carousel Park, 602 Settlers Landing Road, across from the Virginia Air and Space Center.

It was listed on the National Register of Historic Places in 1992.

== See also ==
- Amusement rides on the National Register of Historic Places
