= Charlotte Moton Hubbard =

American government official

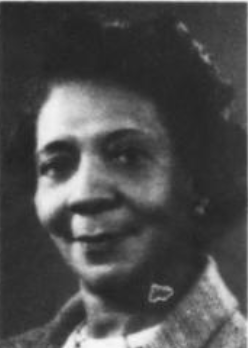
- Charlotte M. Hubbard, from a 1964 publication of the US Department of State
- Born: Charlotte Moton; November 27, 1911; Hampton, Virginia, U.S.
- Died: December 18, 1994 (aged 83); Chevy Chase, Maryland, U.S.
- Education: Tuskegee Institute (1931); Boston University (1934)
- Known for: First black woman to be deputy assistant secretary of state
- Parents: Robert Russa Moton (father); Jennie Dee Booth Moton (mother)

Charlotte Moton Hubbard (November 7, 1911 – December 18, 1994) was the U.S. deputy assistant secretary of state from 1964 to 1970, the first black woman to serve in this role.

== Early life ==
Charlotte Moton was born to Robert Russa Moton and Jennie Dee Booth Moton – both educators and community leaders – on November 27, 1911, in Hampton, Virginia. She had two sisters: Catherine and Jennie.

Charlotte Moton married Maceo W. Hubbard, an attorney with the United States Department of Justice and civil rights activist, on December 29, 1949. They were married until his death in 1991.

== Education ==
Hubbard graduated in 1931 with a certificate in Home Economics from the Tuskegee Institute, where her father was the principal, and later graduated from Boston University’s Sargent College of Physical Education in 1934 with a bachelor's of science degree in Education and Physical Education. While a student at Boston University, Hubbard refused to live in a segregated dormitory, raising the issue with university officials. Her early activism against racial discrimination continued throughout her life.

== Career ==
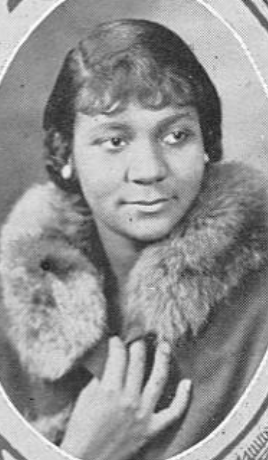
Charlotte Moton Hubbard from the 1929 yearbook of Tuskegee Institute

Hubbard began her career in 1934 as an associate professor of Health and Physical Education at the Hampton Institute in Hampton, Virginia. She served as co-director of the Hampton Institute Creative Dance Group and helped increase the number of female dancers in the dance company. She worked there until 1942 when she joined the Office of Community War Services, part of the Federal Security Agency, in Washington, D.C.

Following the end of World War II, Hubbard worked and consulted in public relations with a variety of organizations, including the Girl Scouts of America, the Tuskegee Institute, and the United Givers Fund. She joined the State Department in 1963 as a coordinator of women's activities.

President Lyndon B. Johnson appointed Hubbard Deputy Assistant Secretary of State for Public Affairs in 1964, the highest rank attained by a black woman at the time. In this role, Hubbard developed programs to address racial discrimination against Black soldiers during the Vietnam War. Hubbard retired in 1970 after the onset of Cushing's disease.

== Death ==
Hubbard died of congestive heart failure at the age of 82 on December 18, 1994, in Chevy Chase, Maryland.
