= Harrison Phoebus =

American entrepreneur and hotelier

Harrison Phoebus (born Levin James Harrison Phoebus, November 1, 1840 – February 25, 1886) was an American 19th century entrepreneur and hotelier who became the leading citizen and namesake of the town of Phoebus in Elizabeth City County, near Fort Monroe, which is now part of the independent city of Hampton, Virginia.

== Biography ==
Phoebus was the son of the Reverend Lewis and Sally (née Ross) Phoebus, youngest of sixteen children; his mother was the third wife of Lewis Phoebus. A native of Somerset County, Maryland, Harrison Phoebus served in the Union Army during the Civil War. After the war, he became an employee of Adams Express Company, where he gained a reputation for diligence and flexibility.

In 1866, he was transferred to become the resident agent for Adams Express at Old Point Comfort in Elizabeth City County, Virginia. He has been described by author Parke S. Rouse, Jr. as a "one-man industry", serving as Old Point's representative of shipping companies, postmaster, notary public, insurance agent and U.S. commissioner. Much of his work was related to the steamships which plied the Chesapeake Bay on routes and routinely docked there.

In 1874, with financial backing from Samuel Shoemaker, a wealthy friend from Baltimore, he acquired the luxurious Hygeia Hotel. The red four-story Victorian structure built in 1868 was the second on the site, rebuilt from an earlier hotel of the same name built in 1820 by William Armstrong while Fort Monroe was under construction. Managed by Marshall Parks of Norfolk, the earlier Hygeia had served until it was demolished by the Union Army in 1862 during the Civil War.

Phoebus built additions to his hotel, chartered boats to bring visitors, and soon Old Point Comfort was on its way to becoming a place where diplomats and government officials mingled with the elite of Baltimore, Philadelphia, Richmond and the Deep South. Amenities he added included hydraulic elevators, gaslights, electric call bells in each bedroom, and bathrooms on every floor. He installed several types of therapeutic baths intended for medicinal purposes, a popular feature of the era.

Harrison Phoebus is credited with persuading Collis Huntington's Chesapeake & Ohio Railway to extend its tracks of the Peninsula Subdivision from Newport News to the community. The railroad named its station and post office after him. The Hygeia attracted many dignitaries and celebrity visitors including P.T. Barnum and U.S. president Ulysses S. Grant.

Harrison Phoebus died suddenly of a heart ailment on February 25, 1886 at the age of 45. He was interred at the cemetery of St. John's Episcopal Church in Hampton. After the community of Chesapeake City became incorporated as a town in 1900, it was renamed "Phoebus" in his honor. After Phoebus's death and the opening of the new Chamberlin in 1896 the Hygeia began to fall into disrepair. In 1902, Secretary of the Army Elihu Root signed an order authorizing the demolition of the Hygeia Hotel to make space for a planned expansion of Fort Monroe. The Army's planned addition to Fort Monroe never materialized and eventually the vast empty space was seeded in grass and made into a park.

Roseland Manor, a Châteauesque Queen Anne style mansion designed by Arthur Crooks and situated on a well landscaped estate overlooking Hampton Roads, that Phoebus was having built for his family was completed after his untimely death. For nearly a century the Gilded Age mansion stood as a community landmark until it was destroyed by fire in 1985.
