= Mary S. Peake =

American teacher and humanitarian

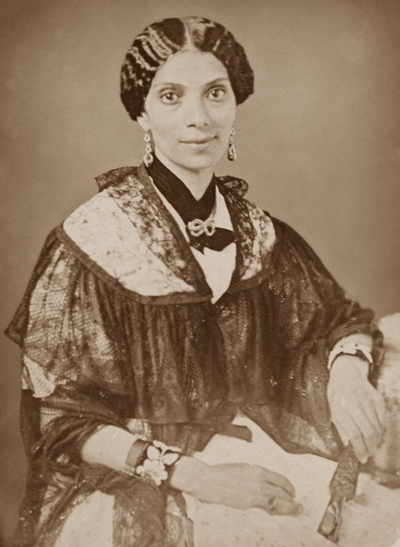
Mary Smith Peake

Mary Smith Peake, born Mary Smith Kelsey (1823 – February 22, 1862), was an American teacher, humanitarian and a member of the black elite in Hampton, best known for starting a school for the children of former slaves starting in the fall of 1861 under what became known as the Emancipation Oak tree in present-day Hampton, Virginia near Fort Monroe. The first teacher hired by the American Missionary Association, she was also associated with its later founding of Hampton University in 1868.

== Early life and education ==
Mary Smith Kelsey was born free in Norfolk, Virginia. Her father was an Englishman "of rank and culture" and her mother was a free woman of color, described as light-skinned. When Mary was six, her mother sent her to Alexandria (then part of the District of Columbia) to attend school. Living with her aunt Mary Paine, Kelsey studied for about ten years. The US Congress enacted a law prohibiting free people of color in the District of Columbia from being educated (as was the case in Virginia and several other southern states). (This was several years before Alexandria was retroceded to Virginia in 1846.) The new law closed all schools for free blacks in that city, as had happened in Virginia after Nat Turner's Rebellion of 1831.

== Career ==
In 1839, at age sixteen Mary Kelsey returned to live with her mother. Despite the risk, she secretly taught slaves and free blacks to read and write, which was prohibited by law. She believed education was important to the race. In 1847 her mother married Thompson Walker and the family moved to Hampton, where they bought a house. In the 1850s she secretly began teaching enslaved and free black Americans and she was one of a number of black women whose teaching was, a few years later, officially sanctioned by the Union army as the United States entered the Civil War.

There Kelsey founded a women's charitable organization, called the Daughters of Zion, whose mission was to assist the poor and the sick. She supported herself chiefly by dressmaking and continued to teach in secret. Among her adult students was her stepfather Thompson Walker, who even more became a leader of the blacks in Hampton. In 1851 Kelsey married Thomas Peake, a freed slave who worked in the merchant marine. They had a daughter named Hattie, whom they nicknamed "Daisy".

During the American Civil War (1861–1865), Union forces maintained control of nearby Fort Monroe, which became a place of refuge for escaped slaves' seeking asylum. The Union defined them as "contraband", a legal status to prevent their being returned to Confederate slaveholders. They built the Grand Contraband Camp near but outside the protection of Fort Monroe.

Mary Peake started teaching the children of former slaves and the American Missionary Association (AMA) paid her some salary and gave support as its first black teacher. She began teaching outside on September 17, 1861 under a large oak tree in Phoebus, a small town nearby in Elizabeth City County. In 1863, the Virginia Peninsula community gathered under this tree to hear the first Southern reading of President Abraham Lincoln's Emancipation Proclamation, and it became known as the Emancipation Oak.

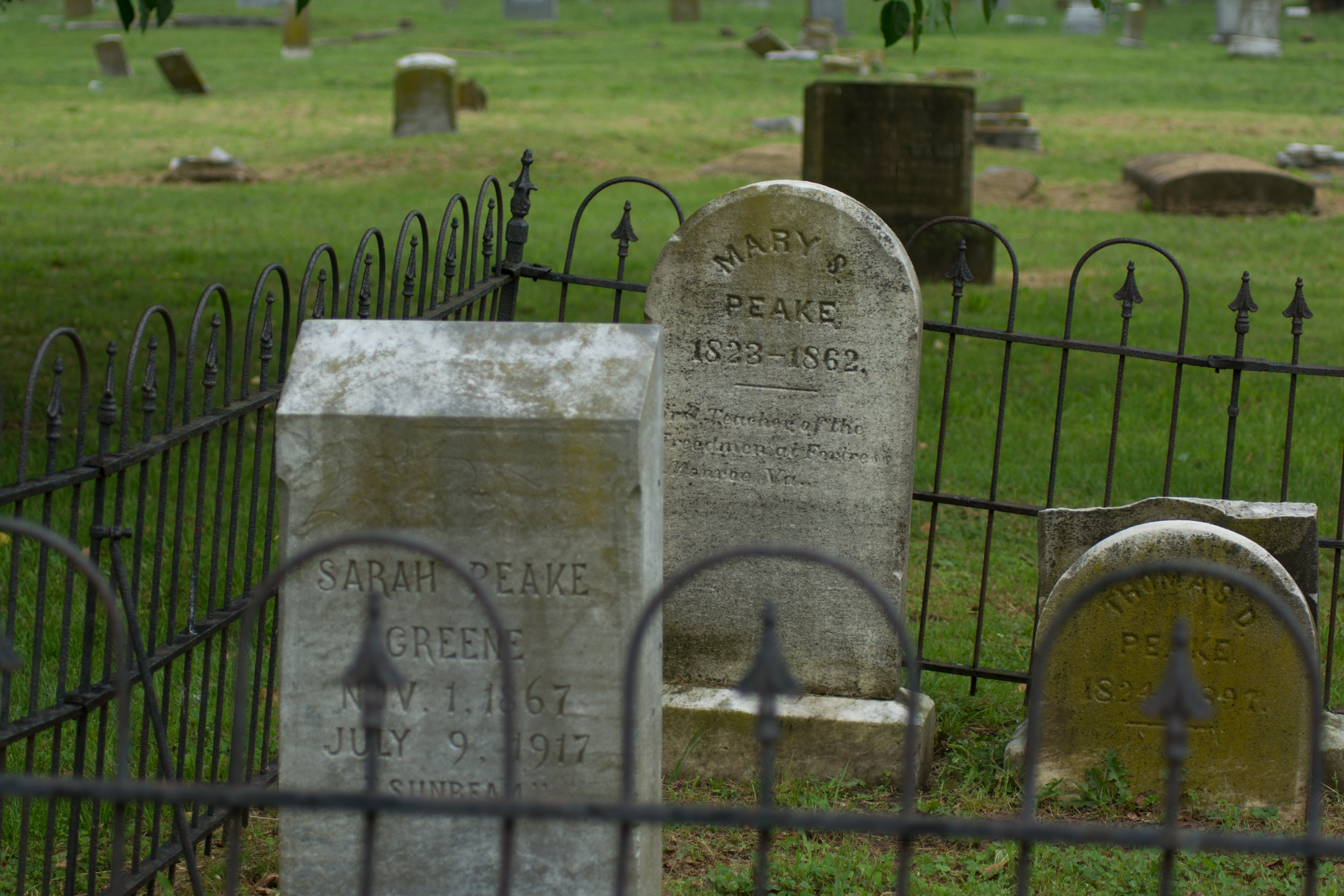
The grave of Mary S. Peake at Historic Elmerton Cemetery in Hampton, VA.

Soon the AMA provided Peake with Brown Cottage, long considered the first facility of Hampton Institute (and later Hampton University). Both children and adults were eager to learn: Mary Peake's school taught more than fifty children during the day and twenty adults at night.

Although seriously ill, Peake continued teaching. On Washington's birthday, February 22, 1862, Peake died of tuberculosis, which she had contracted before the war.

The historic Emancipation Oak still stands near the entrance to the campus of Hampton University in what is now the City of Hampton. It is designated a National Historic Landmark by the Department of the Interior and one of the 10 Great Trees of the World by the National Geographic Society.

== Legacy and honors ==
- Reverend Lewis C. Lockwood, Mary S. Peake, the Colored Teacher at Fortress Monroe (1862; reprint 1969). Lockwood was the first missionary to the freedmen at Fort Monroe and greatly admired Peake. His biography of her is available at Project Gutenberg.
- The Mary Peake Center of Hampton Public Schools is named in her honor.
- Mary Peake Boulevard in Hampton was also named in her honor.
