= Brown Cottage =

Coordinates: 37°1′22.8″N 76°19′49.1″W

Brown Cottage was the first building of the educational institution in Hampton, Virginia now known as Hampton University. Mary S. Peake used the cottage to teach both children and adult freedmen.

== See also ==
- Mary S. Peake
- Hampton University
