= Phyllis Haislip =

American author and historian (born 1944)

- Born: September 1, 1944 (age 81)
- Education: Columbia University (PhD)
- Occupations: Author; historian

Phyllis Haislip (born September 1, 1944) is an American author and historian. Her best-known work may be "Lottie's Courage," the story of a contraband slave growing up during the American Civil War.

Haislip’s work is informed by a Ph.D. from Columbia University in history and extensive, primary source research. She has taught history at universities such as the College of William & Mary and the University of Richmond. Her scholarly historical works range from the European Renaissance to the United States in World War II. Her published works on World War I submarine warfare and naval commerce raiders have been especially popular. She writes both fiction and non-fiction and has won awards such as The Beacon of Freedom .

== Books ==
Year	Title
2003	Lottie’s Courage: A Contraband Slave's Story
2003	Marching in Time: The Colonial Williamsburg Fife And Drum Corps (non-fiction)
2004	Anybody's Hero: The Battle of Old Men and Young Boys
2005	Divided Loyalties: A Revolutionary War Fifer's Story
2007	Lili's Gift: A Civil War Healer's Story
2010	The Time Magus
2013	The Viscount's Daughter (The Narbonne Inheritance, Book 1)
2014	The Viscountess (The Narbonne Inheritance, Book 2)
2016	The Viscountess and the Templars (The Narbonne Inheritance, Book 3)
