= Haysbert =

Haysbert is a surname. Notable people with the surname include:

- Dennis Haysbert (born 1954), American actor
- JoAnn Haysbert (born 1948), American educator and academic administrator
- Raymond V. Haysbert (1920–2010), American businessman and civil rights activist
