= Carl Warner =

British artist, director, author and photographer

- Born: 1963 (age 62–63); Liverpool, United Kingdom
- Education: Maidstone College of Art London College of Printing
- Occupations: Photographer, artist, author, director
- Years active: 1998–present
- Notable work: Broccoli Forest Smoked Salmon Sea London Skyline The Valley of the Reclining Woman
- Website: carlwarner.com

Carl Warner (born 1963) is a British artist, director, author and photographer. Warner blends photography and art to make highly conceptual visual images. He is based in London. He is best known for his intricate food landscapes where he uses different types of foods and ingredients. He is also known for his Bodyscapes.

== Life and work ==
=== Foodscapes ===
After his success on the internet creating food art images, he began to make more elaborate works, often made to look like famous landmarks, and always made out of real food. The goal of these projects is to trick the human eye into thinking the scene is real at first glance, and Warner uses anything from fresh vegetables and fruits to bread, cheese, and sometimes meat and fish, as well as Tungsten lights in order to create the appearance of sunlight. These elaborate Foodscapes are his most popular work and he often gets hired to create them for large food production companies.

=== Bodyscapes ===
Warner's more recent Bodyscapes is a series of bodyscapes which repeat body parts in a pattern that creates the illusion of a landscape. This piece is meant to redefine portraiture by focusing on the importance of every part of our bodies. Warner creates these portraits by photographing the body parts individually and editing them together in order to create a landscape effect.

=== Pizzascapes ===
Warner created Pizzascapes as a promotional project for DiGiorno Pizza. The project includes 20 different artworks depicting pizzas in scenes relevant to the pizza toppings, such as a pineapple pizza appearing to be in an island landscape. The backgrounds of these images were created out of a combination of figurines and food; many depict tiny people assembling or interacting with the pizzas.

== Director ==
=== Television advertisements ===
Warner has directed and created television commercials for Nestlé, Honey Nut Cheerios, Moe's Southwest Grill and the Milan EXPO 2015.

The Milan Expo in 2015 focused on Feeding the planet. UK Trade and Investment partnered with Warner to display the UK's impact in global agriculture innovation. Warner created a series of animations using beans, rice, coffee and maize to illustrate the UK's global solutions to feeding the planet. His commercial was titled Resilient Rice.

Warner has collaborated with Moe's Southwest Grill to create new augmented reality foodscapes made with Moe's fresh ingredients.

Warner is developing an educational TV program for children including characters made out of healthy food, with the purpose of encouraging healthy eating for children.

== Photographer ==
Most of Warner's work has been in advertising. Warner is considered more of a photographic illustrator who creates and transforms one thing into another using composition and lighting. The scenes are photographed in layers from foreground to background. The process is time consuming and the food quickly wilts under the lights. Each element is then put together in post production to achieve the final image.

=== Other worlds ===
The goal with Warner's other world photography is to use objects that people would not normally take the time to look at. Warner finds beauty in the mundane and the banal, in creating landscapes from the contents of a fridge or building cities from sea shells or car parts.

=== Still life ===
Through his own studio Warner created still life photography for Nestlé, Unilever, Hugo Boss, and Whiskas.

== Published works ==
=== Carl Warner's Food Landscapes ===
Food Landscapes was published in 2010 by Harry N. Abrams in New York. The book collects Warner's early works spanning from 1998. It shows behind the scenes images of Warner and his team assembling the structures. It covers details of what inspired each Foodscape and how each was created from initial sketches through to the ingredients used in the photography.

=== A World of Food: Discover Magical Lands Made of Things You Can Eat! ===
Warner's second book, A World of Food, is a children's book published in 2012 by Harry N. Abrams. Each Foodscape is composed primarily of a single color and is accompanied by poems written by Warner. Each image is composed entirely from foods from around the world. With this book, Warner hopes to alter children's perception of food and educate them about healthy eating and nutrition.
