= George R. Bolling =

Tuskegee Airman (1920–2007)

George R. Bolling I
- Born: George Richard Bolling; August 4, 1920; Hampton, Virginia, US
- Died: March 22, 2007 (aged 86); San Jose, California, US
- Resting place: Oak Hill Memorial Park in San Jose, California
- Education: Hampton Institute
- Occupations: Military officer; fighter pilot; U.S. postal worker
- Years active: 1942–1961

George Richard Bolling I (August 4, 1920 – March 22, 2007) was a U.S. Army Air Force/U.S. Air Force officer and combat fighter pilot with the 332nd Fighter Group's 99th Fighter Squadron, best known as the famed Tuskegee Airmen. He was one of 1,007 documented Tuskegee Airmen Pilots.

== Early life ==
Bolling was born on August 4, 1920, at the Hampton Institute in Hampton, Virginia. He was the son of Edward A. Bolling Sr. (1884–1958) and Georgia A. Bridgeforth Bolling (1885–1946) of Lunenburg County, Virginia, who married in 1916.

Bolling had three siblings: brother Roscoe Howard Bolling (1924–d. in childbirth), sister Gladys Bolling Fletcher (1922–2007), a Hampton Institute and Atlanta University-trained school librarian, and brother Edward Alfonzo Bolling Jr. (1918–1997), an agriculture engineering instructor and 17-year manager of Hampton Institute's campus farm and U.S. international agricultural advisor to the federal government.

Bolling attended all-black Whittier Elementary and Phenix High School in Hampton, Virginia. After graduating from high school, Bolling majored in engineering at Hampton Institute (now Hampton University), graduating in 1940.

Bolling married Dolores Bolling (1924–2014) of Apalachicola, Florida. Raised in Tallahassee, Florida, Dolores completed a bachelor's degree at Florida A & M University where she pledged Alpha Kappa Alpha sorority. Dolores relocated to Columbus, Ohio, to live with Bolling who was stationed at Columbus Air Force Base. While in Columbus, Dolores earned a master's degree in biology at Ohio State University. As the U.S. Air Force reassigned Bolling, the Bollings relocated throughout the U.S. and Japan. After the family relocated to San Jose, California, Dolores taught biology at Sheppard Middle School for eight years.

Bolling and Dolores had three sons: George R. "Ricky" Bolling II (Died 2009), John Raymond Bolling, and Frank Daniel Bolling (1963 – July 12, 2004). They also had one granddaughter, Francine M. Bolling.

== Military career ==
Bolling left Hampton Institute after being recruited into the U.S. Army Air Corps. On July 3, 1942, Bolling graduated from the Tuskegee Flight School's Single Engine Section Cadet Class SE-42-F, receiving his wings and commission as a 2nd Lieutenant. After graduation he was assigned to the 332nd Fighter Group's 99th Fighter Squadron.

During combat missions, he was shot down twice. On July 11, 1943, his aircraft was hit by an enemy ship's anti-aircraft artillery, he bailed from his plane, landing in the Mediterranean, where he was rescued by boat after a day at sea.

In 1961, he retired from the U.S. Air Force with the rank of Major.

== Post-military career ==
After leaving the U.S. Air Force, Bolling joined the U.S. Postal Service in San Jose, California, working there for 20 years.

== Death ==
Bolling died on March 22, 2007, in San Jose, California. He was interred at Oak Hill Memorial Park in San Jose, California.

== See also ==
- Executive Order 9981
- List of Tuskegee Airmen
- List of Tuskegee Airmen Cadet Pilot Graduation Classes
- Military history of African Americans
