= Tiara Moore =

Researcher

- Education: Winthrop University; Hampton University; University of California, Los Angeles
- Scientific career
- Workplaces: The Nature Conservancy

Tiara Moore works at the Washington state branch of The Nature Conservancy. She is known for her leadership in organizing the Black in Marine Science week and her work in social activism.

== Early life and education ==
Moore is from Greenwood, South Carolina, and has an undergraduate degree in biology from Winthrop University. After getting a master's at Hampton University in Virginia, Moore went on to earn a Ph.D. in Biology from UCLA, where she published a thesis on algal blooms in estuaries. As of 2021, she is a postdoctoral fellow at The Nature Conservancy.

== Activism ==
During the 2012 elections, Moore mentioned conversations within the black community in the Washington Post. She is best known for creating the #BlackInMarineScienceWeek hashtag in the aftermath of the Central Park birdwatching incident. Her role establishing the event was covered in the media including TV channels, NOVA, and the Christian Science Monitor. The inaugural week for Black in Marine Science ran from November 29 to December, 2020. After the idea gained significant traction, Moore worked with collaborators, including Camille Gaynus, to create a more traditional Black in Marine Science organization, where she is CEO. Moore also founded A WOC Space as a means to present cultural change for women of color, and in 2020 met with the press to talk about how this virtual meeting space had been zoombombed. Moore was profiled by the California Academy of Sciences in a 2021 video.

== Research ==
Moore uses environmental DNA to guide forest management and promote biodiversity. Her research on environmental DNA in the context of forest management has received coverage in the science enthusiast community, and in the popular press. The work is intended to develop forest management practices that can be used to increase biodiversity, and to fix carbon in trees to combat climate change. Moore has discussed her work on forensic ecology with Alie Ward on her Ologies podcast.

== Honors and awards ==
In May 2021, Moore received an award from the Black Voices for Black Justice Fund for her work on Black in Marine Science and with A WOC Space.
