= Phil Griffin =

American television executive (born 1956)

- Born: Philip T. Griffin; November 27, 1956 (age 69)
- Education: Vassar College
- Occupation: President of MSNBC

Philip T. Griffin (born November 27, 1956) is an American television executive, who from 2008 to 2021 served as president of MSNBC, a United States cable news channel.

== Early life ==
The youngest of four children, Griffin grew up in Chappaqua, New York and Toledo, Ohio. His father was an executive at Macy's. Griffin's family were Democrats and politically minded. As a child, his mother took him to rallies for the hungry. His brother was a conscientious objector.

In 1979, Griffin graduated with a degree in English from Vassar College. He wrote his thesis on Milton's Paradise Lost.

== Early career ==
Following graduation, Griffin moved to Atlanta to take a minimum wage job at the fledgling CNN. Griffin was working a camera at CNN when it aired for the first time, on June 1, 1980.

At CNN, he befriended future MSNBC host Keith Olbermann, who worked there as a sportscaster. After several years with CNN, working primarily as a writer-producer-editor in their sports department, Griffin began work at NBC in 1983, working as a relief producer for vacationing producers at The Today Show. Six months later Griffin convinced The Today Show's executive producer to hire him on staff.

In 1987, he became a producer at USA Today: The Television Show. After it was canceled, he returned to The Today Show. At NBC, Griffin had several jobs, including as a senior broadcast producer for NBC Nightly News with Tom Brokaw. He led the NBC News coverage of the O. J. Simpson trial.

== NBCUniversal/MSNBC ==
Griffin was with MSNBC from its start in 1996. He has been executive producer for shows such as Hardball with Chris Matthews and MSNBC's The Big Show with Keith Olbermann. He was the head of prime-time programming for the network. Griffin approved the launch of many shows, including The Rachel Maddow Show and Morning Joe. He also hired Lawrence O'Donnell, Ed Schultz, and Chris Hayes.

In 2005, former NBCUniversal CEO Jeff Zucker appointed Griffin senior vice president of NBC News and in 2008, president of MSNBC.

In 2013, Griffin said he wanted MSNBC to be more of a lifestyle brand than a political hub. In 2014, Griffin said the network would take steps to widen its demographic to include a more ethnically diverse audience, to increase its coverage outside of the Washington, D.C. beltway and to appeal to younger viewers, including with online initiatives. Griffin has asserted that MSNBC is an independent voice that does not favor Democrats. He has rejected claims that partisanship is equivalent at MSNBC and Fox News.

In 2016, after MSNBC started covering more hard news during the day, Griffin likened its evening shows to an op-ed page in a newspaper. The network had its highest ever ratings in 2016 and in the first quarter of 2017 averaged 1.46 million views in prime time, beating CNN. Griffin said that he thought the surge in audience was attributable to scoops and new information, rather than partisan leanings.

In May 2017, Griffin signed a multi-year renewal contract to remain as president of MSNBC in the midst of a ratings surge during and following the 2016 presidential election. In June 2017, he said that the network was making an effort to include diverse political voices. Earlier in the year, Griffin signed former George W. Bush communications director Nicolle Wallace to host an afternoon program for the network.

On December 7, 2020, MSNBC announced that at the end of January, Griffin would be replaced with journalist and television executive Rashida Jones.

== Personal life ==
In 1997, Griffin married Kory Kim Apton in a civil ceremony in New York. They have two children, daughter Riley and son Jackson.

He has said his idols are former Fox News CEO Roger Ailes and former NBC News anchor Tom Brokaw. "I am one of the few people in television who never wanted to be on-air," he told The New Republic in 2013.
