= Phenix High School =

Location
- 37°1′19.8″N 76°20′7.4″W

Information
- Former name: George P. Phenix Training School (1931 to 1953)
- Type: Public, segregated
- Founded: 1931
- Closed: 1968
- Last updated: 29 December 2017

Phenix High School was a segregated public school for African Americans, active from 1931 to 1968. It was created by the Hampton Institute, now Hampton University, as a normal school near the town of Hampton and Fort Monroe in Elizabeth City County, Virginia in 1931.

== History ==
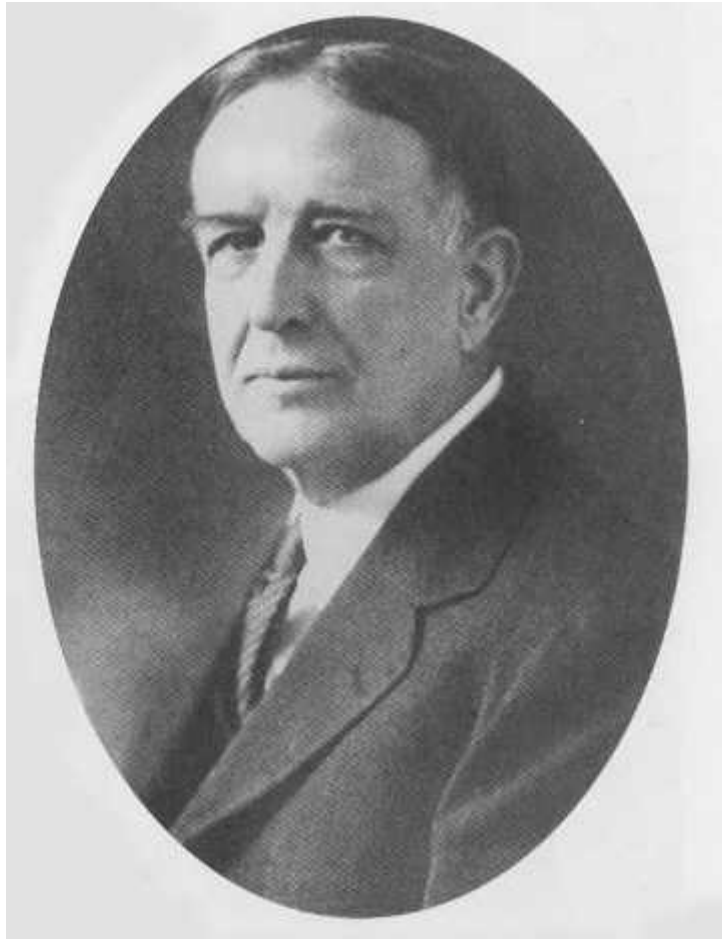
George Perley Phenix

Phenix High School was first established as the George P. Phenix Training School in 1931. It succeeded the earlier Whittier School and Butler School. The school was named for George Perley Phenix (1864–1930), a native of Maine, who was Hampton Institute's fourth principal, and subsequently the first to hold the title of president. It was Phenix who lobbied the Virginia State Board of Education to build a modern facility for the Black youth in the community. A popular administrator, Dr. Phenix died suddenly in a drowning accident a few months before the new school he had championed opened.

The school was built by Hampton Institute to serve as a normal school, a training ground for the university students who were learning to become teachers. The single, three story building originally included both a seven-year grammar school and a four-year high school. Anyone seeking a degree in education had to serve as a student teacher at Phenix - either at the high school or at the grammar school located at another end of the building. The parents paid a small fee so their children could attend the school.

In 1940, the Phenix building was leased to the Elizabeth City County school system. to serve as a public high school for the Black students in the area. In 1953, the Phenix Training School became a senior high school, serving students in grades 10 through 12, and became George P. Phenix High School.

The original building survives as Phenix Hall on the University's campus, and houses several research offices including the Department of Atmospheric and Planetary Sciences, which hosts the data center for NASA's Aeronomy of Ice in the Mesosphere mission, the only space mission managed by a historically black university.

In 1962, Phenix High School relocated to a new building off campus which was in the Hampton City Public School system. This was Hampton's only high school for Black students, at the time. The class of 1965 was the largest class to graduate from Phenix High School. They were the first class to start as freshmen and graduate as seniors. In 1968, three years later due to reorganization to accomplish racial integration of the Hampton public high schools, the second Phenix High School was renamed Pembroke High School. This naming concession was made to not upset the local White population who would be offended by attending a school with the reputation of being a school for Black students. That building closed in 1980, and the building now houses the Hampton Family YMCA and social services offices of the Hampton city government.

Hampton opened a new George P. Phenix School for pre-kindergarten through 8th grade in September 2010. Citizens of Hampton, led by members of the Phenix Alumni Association, had run a vigorous public campaign to make sure the heritage of the George P. Phenix name would not die in their city of Hampton, Virginia.

== Notable graduates ==
- George R. Bolling I, U.S. Army Air Corps/U.S. Air Force Officer and member of the Tuskegee Airmen
- Mary Christian, politician, university dean and professor
- Weldon Irvine, composer, pianist, bandleader and songwriter
- James West, inventor, primarily of microphones
- Mary Winston-Jackson, NASA engineer, Class of 1937
