= Augustus M. Hodges =

American journalist (1854–1916)

Augustus Michael Hodges
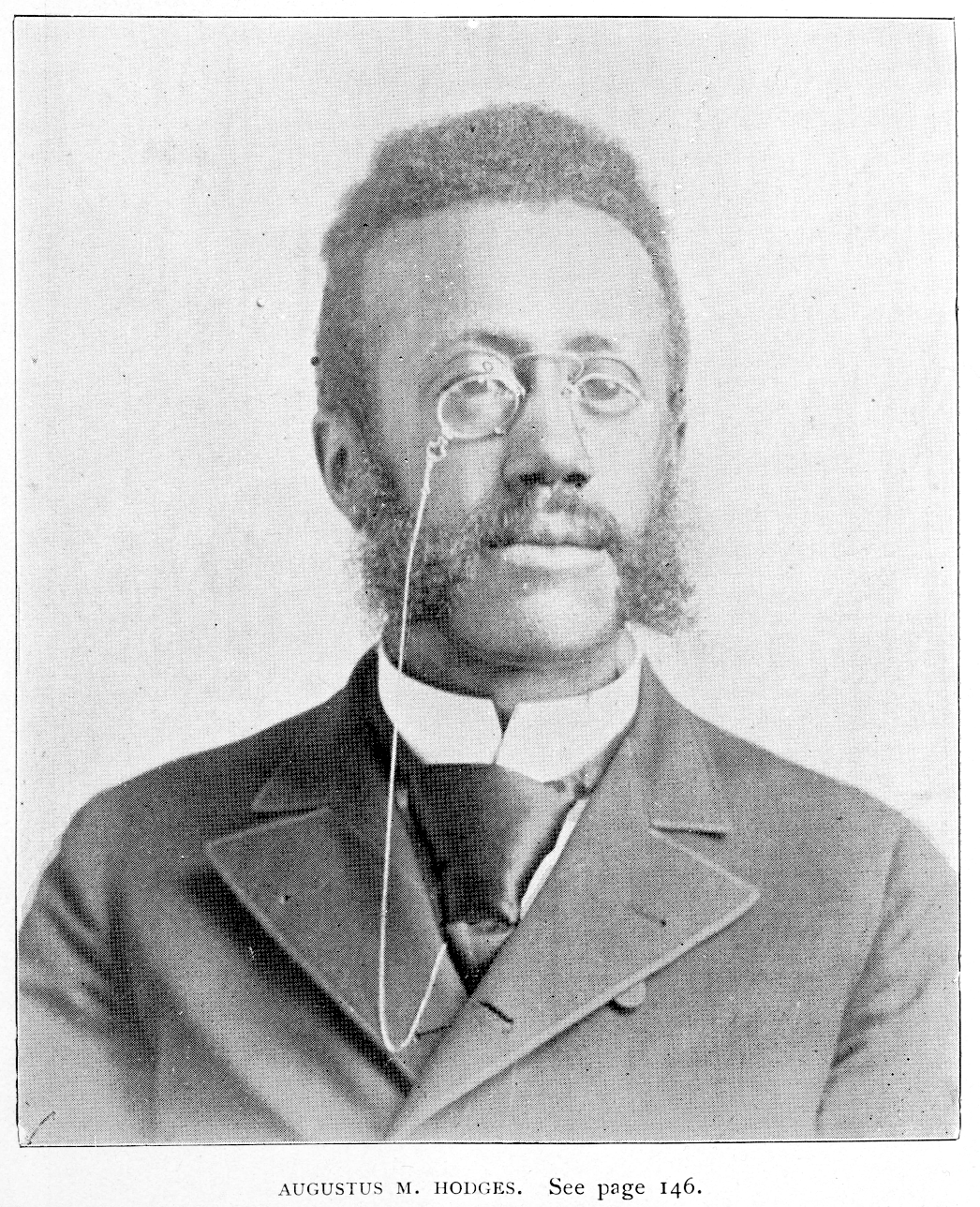
- Born: March 18, 1854; Williamsburg, Virginia, U.S.
- Died: August 22, 1916; New York City, New York, U.S.
- Other names: B. Square Bluster, B. Square
- Education: Hampton Normal and Agricultural Institute
- Occupations: Editor, journalist, writer, political organizer
- Father: Willis Augustus Hodges

Augustus Michael Hodges (pen name B. Square, or B. Square Bluster; 1854–1916), was an American editor, writer, journalist, and political organizer.

== Biography ==
Augustus Michael Hodges was born March 18, 1854, in Williamsburg, Virginia, to parents Sarah Ann (née Corprew) and Willis A. Hodges. Although some sources state he may have been born in Brooklyn, New York. He was the eldest child in his family. His family was considered "Black elite", they originated in Tidewater area of Virginia and had been free since the late-18th century. His paternal uncles were antislavery activists Charles Edward Hodges (1819–after 1910) and William Johnson Hodges (?–1872).

Hodges attended Hampton Normal and Agricultural Institute (now Hampton University) and graduated in 1874.

He was a writer for the newspapers The New York Globe, The Colored American, The Indianapolis Freeman, and The Brooklyn Sentinel. In his newspaper column he sometimes wrote about African-American aristocracy, and it a made clear distinction from "upstart nobodies" in the news. Under his pen name he wrote poems and novels.

In later life he was active in politics in Brooklyn. In January 1908, he was elected as secretary of the Colored Political League. In 1910, he presided over the Colored Citizens League of the Fourth and Fifth Congressional Districts convention held at Mt. Lebanon Baptist Church in Brooklyn, New York. He had an illness for many weeks, before dying on August 22, 1916.

== Publications ==
- Collier–Thomas, Bettye, ed. (1997). A Treasury of African American Christmas Stories. Pauline Hopkins, Fanny Barrier Williams, T. Thomas Fortune, Augustus M. Hodges, Alice Moore Dunbar-Nelson, Langston Hughes, John Henrik. Henry Holt & Company. ISBN 9780805051223.
