= WhyIStayed/WhyILeft =

Trending hashtag in November 2014 in defense of domestic abuse victims

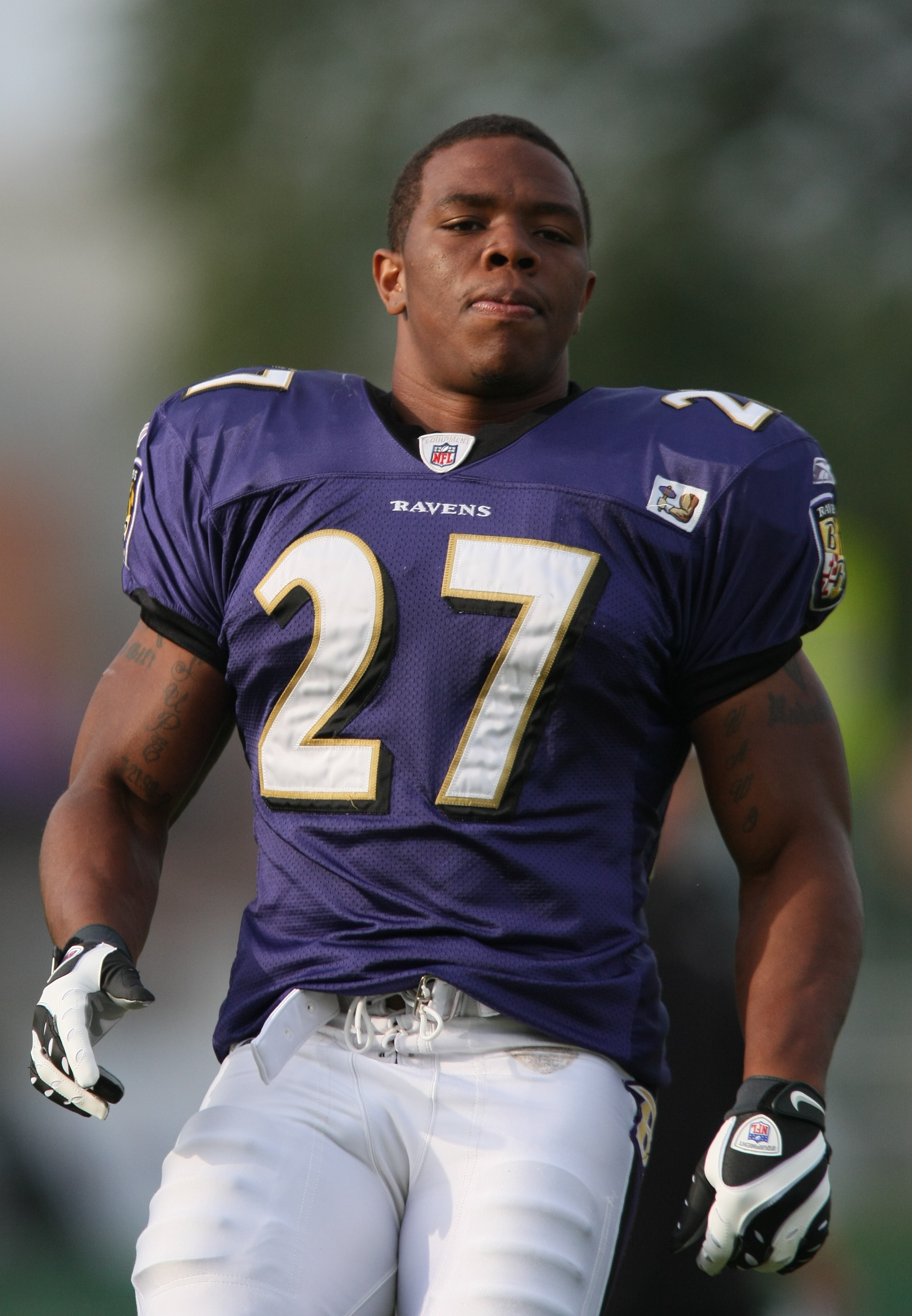
Ray Rice

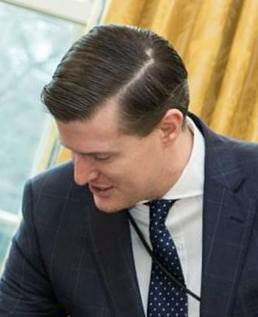
Rob Porter

#WhyIStayed became a trending hashtag in November 2014 in defense of domestic abuse victims after a media release of security camera footage that appeared to show former Baltimore Ravens running back, Ray Rice, punching his then-fiancée, Janay Rice, sparked public conversation on why Janay and other victims of abuse choose to stay in abusive relationships. The hashtag was started by writer and domestic abuse survivor Beverly Gooden via Twitter in an effort to "change the tone of the conversation." It began to trend nationally five hours after its creation and was used more than 100,000 times in less than two days, according to the Web analytics tool, Topsy.

== Timeline ==
=== 2014 ===
==== Ray Rice Assault and the National Football League ====
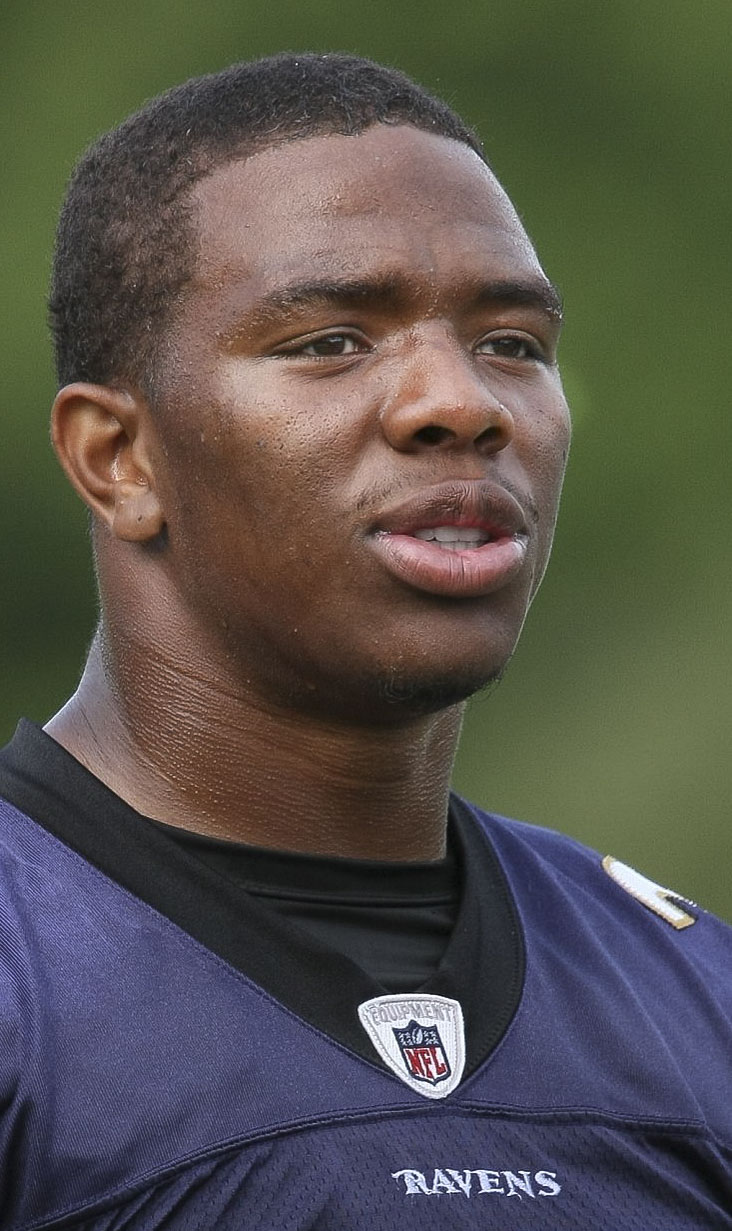
Ray Rice was a running back for the Baltimore Ravens.

On February 19, TMZ obtained and released initial footage of a potential altercation between former Ravens running back Ray Rice and then fiancée Janay Palmer. The footage showed Rice dragging an unconscious Palmer out of an elevator in the Revel Casino of Atlantic City, New Jersey, until security arrived and Rice walked away from the situation. Rice's attorney Michael Diamondstein stated that the released footage was not the whole picture, and that his client would not pursue any action.

On March 28, Ray Rice and Janay Palmer got married. Friends and family were supportive and in attendance, including former Ravens wide receiver Torrey Smith who expressed to the media that the couple was happy and that he wished his friends the best.

On May 23, the Ravens hosted a press conference for Ray and Janay Rice. Ray apologized to his fans, the team, and the team's executives, but not his wife, for the situation he and his wife were in. Janay Rice apologized for her role in the incident, sparking outrage online and in the media that the Ravens coverage of the event focused on Rice's professional career and potential instead of accountability.

On July 24, the NFL suspended Ray Rice for two games. The decision, seen as a slap on the wrist, was met with more outrage; clashing reports circulated regarding the NFL's honesty about the situation.

On August 28, NFL Commissioner Roger Goodell expressed regret for the original disciplinary measure and issued new standards for the NFL's domestic violence policy to all personnel, including a six-game suspension without pay for a first offense and a lifetime ban for a second offense.

On September 8, TMZ released full footage of the assault, which shows Rice and Palmer getting into a heated argument and Rice striking Palmer first. Palmer strikes him back once, and then Rice strikes her forcefully enough that she falls and hits the railing, rendering her unconscious. In reaction to the leak, Ravens head coach John Harbaugh claimed that the team had not seen the video until now, and later that day Ray Rice was both terminated from the Ravens and suspended indefinitely from the NFL.

In the wake of the media covering the released footage, Janay Rice expressed that she had no intention of divorcing her now-husband and did not view herself as an abuse victim. On Instagram, Janay wrote, "To make us relive a moment in our lives that we regret every day is a horrible thing." Beyond the pull to stay together for the sake of their daughter, Rayven, Janay argued that the violent night in Atlantic City was an anomaly in their relationship. In an interview with ESPN, she said, "As angry as I was, I knew it was something that we could move on from because I know Ray." She added that the violence was not one-sided; Janay was the one to initiate it, slapping Ray before he assaulted her. She stressed her hope that people would see the love that the two have for one another despite one isolated incident, and their growth because of it.

Media coverage and social media users expressed outrage and criticized both the NFL for not taking appropriate action and Janay Rice for staying and marrying Ray after the assault. Fox and Friends co-hosts Brian Kilmeade and Steve Doocy joked about taking the stairs instead of the elevator to avoid incidents like this being documented on camera.

==== Beverly Gooden ====
In response, domestic violence survivor Beverly Gooden posted a series of tweets detailing her own experiences with partner violence with the hashtag #WhyIStayed. Her aim was to shift the conversation from asking why Janay Rice stayed in the relationship to asking why Ray Rice hit her in the first place. The hashtag was utilized more than 100,000 times in less than two days following Gooden's original tweets. The hashtag #WhyILeft was also created, with women tweeting about what enabled survivors to escape from domestic violence, and was trending on Twitter that same night.

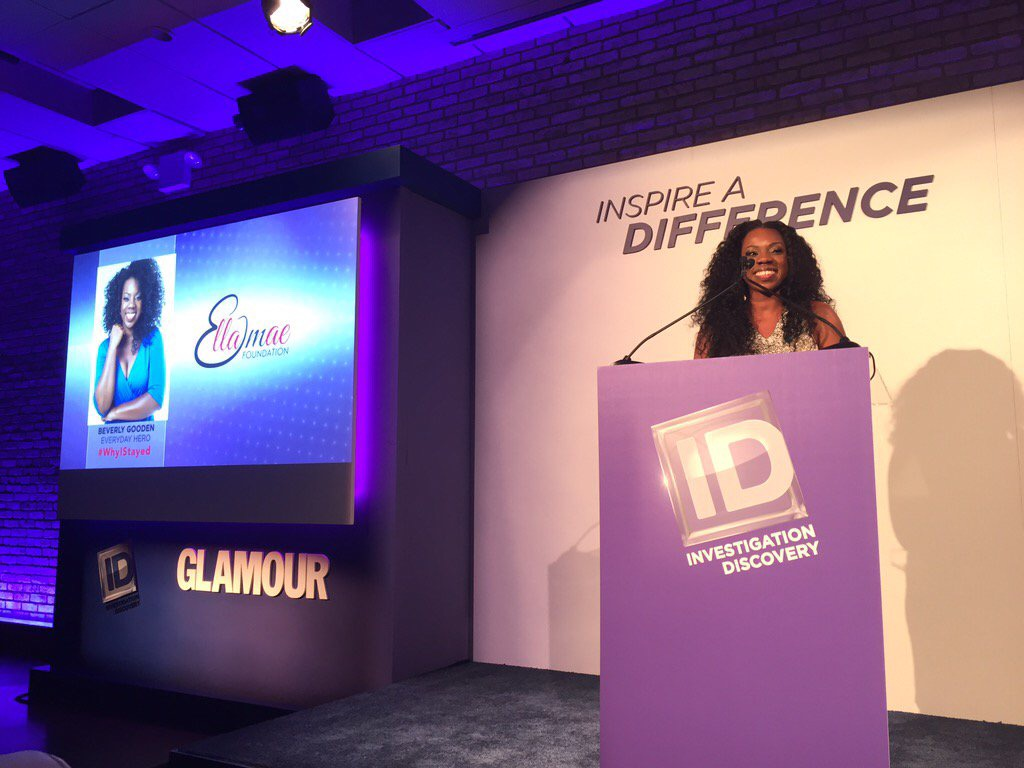
Beverly Gooden is the founder of the #WhyIStayed movement.

==== Press coverage ====
The movement received press coverage from outlets such as Good Morning America, TIME, ABC News, Channel 4 News UK, Mic, MSNBC, TODAY.com, CNN, BBC, and The Huffington Post.

On September 17, talk show host Meredith Vieira shared her abuse story and history with domestic violence in support of the #WhyIStayed movement on The Meredith Vieira Show. Later in October, Dr. Phil and wife Robin McGraw organized a national summit on domestic violence in Hollywood to discuss prevention of abuse as well as resources for victims. The summit was hosted by McGraw's own Revelation Foundation in a partnership with Verizon, and had panelists such as CBS2's Pat Harvey speak on the theme of “Silent No More.”

==== Ray and Janay Rice's Response ====
In response to #WhyIStayed/#WhyILeft, Janay said she was thankful that her experience with domestic violence instigated the movement. Despite the difficulty of enduring the scrutiny that comes from the publicization of a private moment, Janay said that the fact that it began a conversation about abuse was a silver lining. Ray Rice later expressed to the media that he did not want a second chance at a football career, valuing instead his second chance with his wife; he now serves as an advocate against domestic abuse.

=== 2018 ===
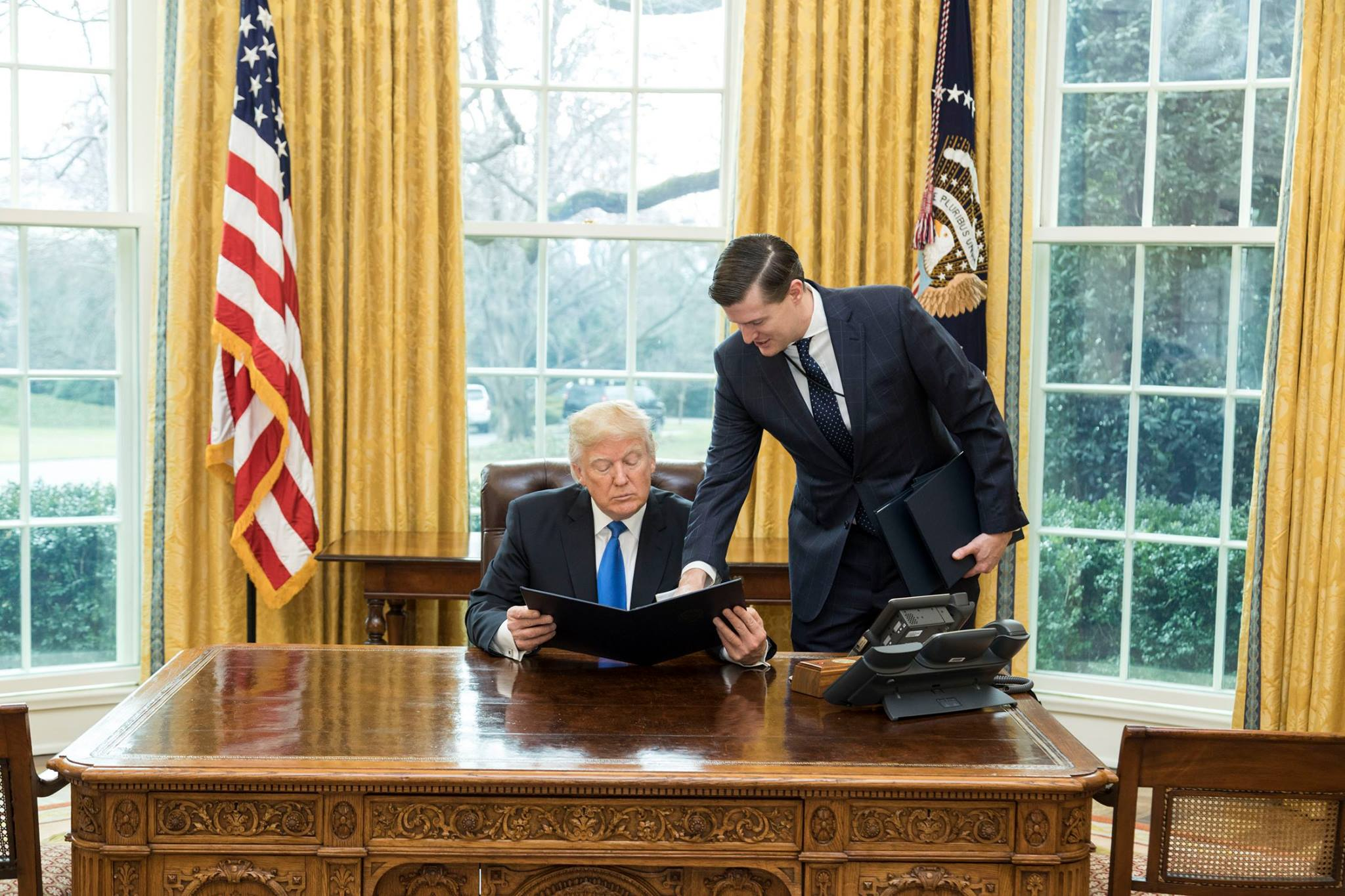
White House aide Rob Porter assists President Donald Trump.

The movement picked back up in 2018 after Jennie Willoughby published a blog post titled “Why I Stayed” about her experiences with domestic violence when married to her ex-husband, former White House staff secretary Rob Porter, in April 2017. The Trump Administration defended Porter, writing the accusations off as a smear campaign, but later White House chief of staff John Kelly admitted mishandling the accusations, and Porter resigned. Lawrence O’Donnell of The Last Word on MSNBC shared Willoughby's letter and tweeted about growing up in the same church as Porter, remembering experiences with seeing battered women silenced. Survivors responded to O’Donnell's tweets using Beverly Gooden's original hashtag #WhyIStayed and later, Willoughby's new hashtag of #AndSoIStayed, and O’ Donnell shared their stories on The Last Word on MSNBC. The associated hashtag #AndWhyILeft was adopted by Jennie Willoughby as a call for hope for survivors to eventually leave partner violence.

== Survivor stories ==
Beverly Gooden's original tweets stated,

"I tried to leave the house once after an abusive episode, and he blocked me. He slept in front of the door that entire night. #WhyIStayed"

"I stayed because my pastor told me that God hates divorce. It didn't cross my mind that God might hate abuse, too.#WhyIStayed"

"He said he would change. He promised it was the last time. I believed him. He lied. #WhyIStayed"

I had to plan my escape for months before I even had a place to go and money for the bus to get there. #WhyIStayed"

"I stayed because I thought love was enough to conquer all. #WhyIStayed"

I stayed because I was halfway across the country, isolated from my friends and family. And there was no one to help. #WhyIStayed"

"You think you know but you have no idea."

Stories of why victims stayed varied from feeling unable to leave out of fear to not knowing that abuse was abnormal. Victims left because they realized their lives were in jeopardy, they started to believe they deserved better, and/or they wanted to protect their children. Examples include:

"Because he made me believe no else would understand. #WhyIStayed" Posted by Twitter user @leslielouz

"I honestly don't know #WhyIStayed as long as I did. I was embarrassed and in denial." Posted by Twitter user @jilliancyork

"I was determined to make it work, wanted kids to have their dad, convinced myself that what he did to me wasn't affecting them #WhyIStayed" Posted by Twitter user @MillerRachelD

"My mom had 3 young kids, a mortgage, and a PT job. My dad had a FT paycheck, our church behind him, and bigger fists. #WhyIStayed" Posted by Twitter user @ellen_3000

"Because good church girls persevere and overcome. #WhyIStayed" Posted by Twitter user @EdwifeAkoua

"WhyIStayed because I was 15 and he said he loved me and I didn't know what love was. I thought I had to marry him. It was my fault." Posted by Twitter user @gabysantiromero

"WhyIStayed Because after being stuck in an abusive relationship for awhile I started to believe I deserved all of it." Posted by Twitter user @9LivesofKat

In 2017, Jennie Willoughby published a blog post titled "Why I Stayed" that detailed her abusive relationship with ex-husband Rob Porter, former White House aide.

"When I tried to get help, I was counseled to consider carefully how what I said might affect his career. And so I kept my mouth shut and stayed. I was told, yes, he was deeply flawed, but then again so was I. And so I worked on myself and stayed. If he was a monster all the time, perhaps it would have been easier to leave. But he could be kind and sensitive. And so I stayed. He cried and apologized. And so I stayed. He offered to get help and even went to a few counseling sessions and therapy groups. And so I stayed. He belittled my intelligence and destroyed my confidence. And so I stayed. I felt ashamed and trapped. And so I stayed. Friends and clergy didn't believe me. And so I stayed. I was pregnant. And so I stayed. I lost the pregnancy and became depressed. And so I stayed."

Lawrence O'Donnell shared these stories on The Last Word on MSNBC, including:

"I tried to be a better wife. And I had babies and I thought maybe I deserved it. And I thought because it wasn't constant and there was no lasting damage. Then he did it in front of my son who was 8. And so I left. #AndSoIStayed" Posted by Twitter user @ValerieSolanas9 "At 20, holding my infant daughter in my arms he hit me in the mouth. She was covered in my blood. I looked at her and said to myself over my dead body will I give her a life like this. Left in the night and never looked back. #AndSoILeft" Posted by Twitter user @Annemieke55

The National Domestic Violence Hotline reported an 80% increase in volume in the day after the footage of Rice assaulting his wife was released, and communications have not decreased to pre-2014 levels since. These stories were highlighted in the short film Why We Stayed, featuring Beverly Gooden and produced by the Emmy-nominated producers of Private Violence.

== Criticism ==
Critics argued that #WhyIStayed perpetuated the idea that victims need to explain themselves more than shift focus to the actions of abusers. Gooden acknowledged the subsequent hashtag of #WhyILeft, though she was initially fearful about how the narrative change would end up alienating people who had not been able to escape yet. Gooden further emphasized that the hashtag's focus was not to endorse abusive relationships, but to provide clarity on why a survivor might stay in that situation.

== Misuse of the hashtag ==
After #WhyIStayed became a trending topic on Twitter, it was mistakenly used by the DiGiorno's Pizza Twitter handle as a marketing effort. They tweeted, "#WhyIStayed You had pizza." The administrator for the account later apologized for the mistake, claiming that no one had looked into the implication of the trending hashtag before taking to Twitter. While many Twitter users brushed over the error, others were deeply angered as they believed DiGiorno was making light of an incredibly serious topic. In response, DiGiorno answered every negative tweet with personal messages conveying their apologies. DiGiorno has since removed the original tweet.

== See also ==
- #YesAllWomen
- #MeToo
