= George Perley Phenix =

American university president (1864–1930)

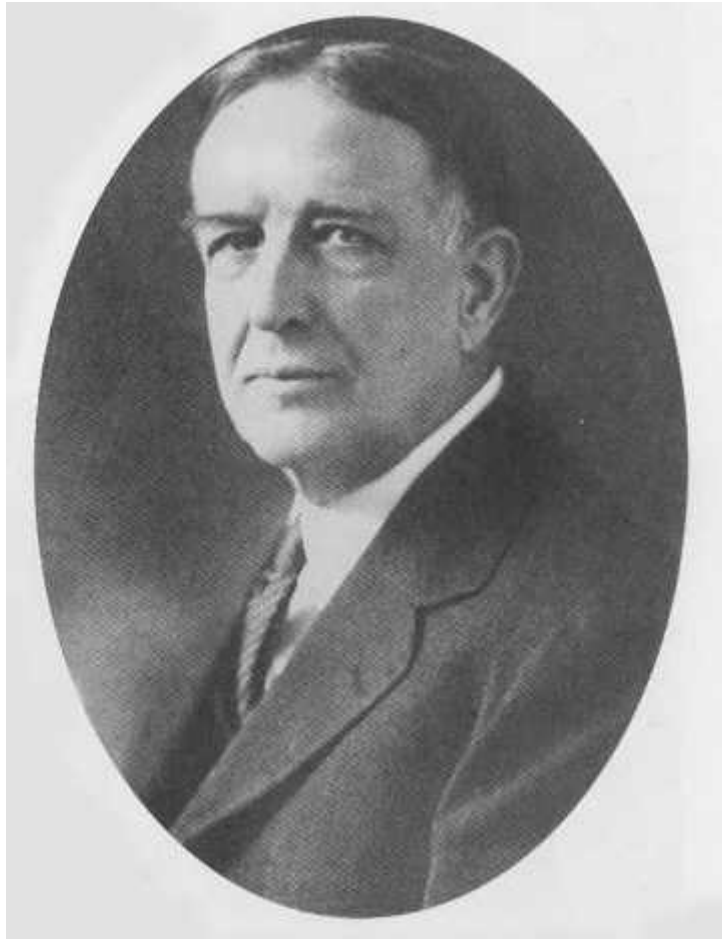

4th President of Hampton Normal and Agricultural Institute
- In office April 1930 – October 1930
- Preceded by: James Edgar Gregg
- Succeeded by: Arthur Howe

Personal details
- Born: September 1864 Portland, Cumberland County, Maine, U.S.
- Died: October 4, 1930 (aged 66) Buckroe Beach, Hampton, Virginia, U.S.
- Resting place: Hampton University Cemetery, Hampton, Virginia, U.S.
- Spouse: Maria Elizabeth Stevens
- Education: Colby College
- Occupation: Educator, university president

George Perley Phenix (1864–1930), was an American educator and university president. He served as the fourth president of Hampton Normal and Agricultural Institute (now Hampton University), a historically Black university. He was the namesake of George P. Phenix High School, a segregated public secondary school for African-Americans affiliated with Hampton Institute.

== Biography ==
Phenix was born in September 1864 in Portland, Maine. He attended Colby College, where he received a D.S. degree (1883) and was a member of Phi Beta Kappa.

After graduation Phenix worked as an instructor of the natural sciences at the State Normal School in New Britain, Connecticut, before he became a principal of the State Normal School at Willimantic. He was married to Maria Elizabeth Stevens, and together they had son George Spencer Phenix.

In 1904, Phenix moved to Hampton, Virginia to teach at Hampton Normal and Agricultural Institute (now Hampton University). He initially worked as a vice principal and director of the summer school at Hampton. In 1930, he was selected as the president of Hampton Normal and Agricultural Institute (now Hampton University), a role in which he served for only 6 months before drowning. He was the first person to be granted the title of "president"; prior to his tenure the title used was "principal". During Phenix's time as president, the name of the school was changed from Hampton Normal and Agricultural Institute to the Hampton Institute, and the school established the School of Nursing.

He died on October 4, 1930, of a heart attack, while swimming at Buckroe Beach. Phenix is buried in the Hampton University Cemetery.
