= Willis Augustus Hodges =

American abolitionist (1815–1890)

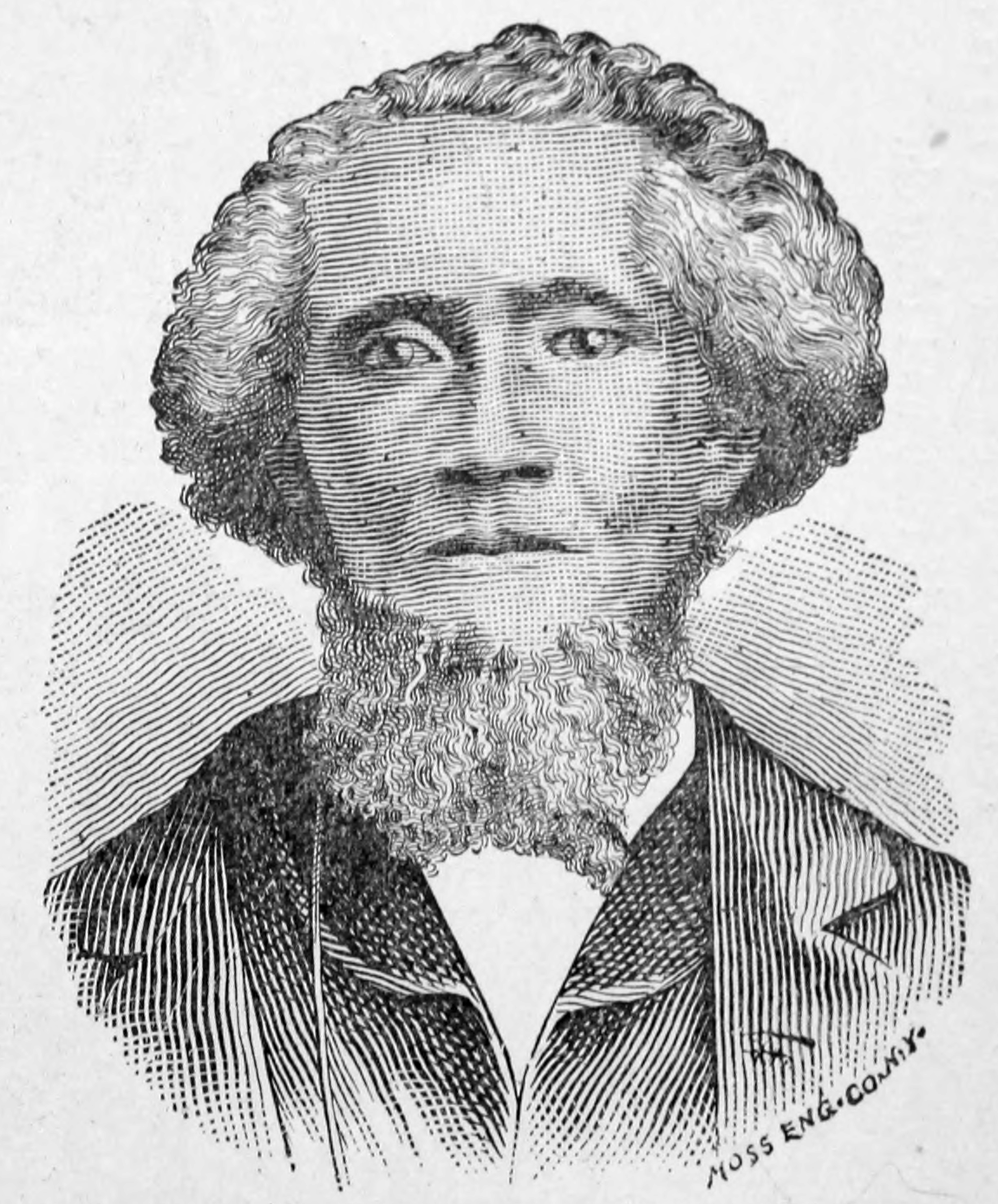
- Born: February 12, 1815; Princess Anne County, Virginia, U.S.
- Died: September 24, 1890 (aged 75); Norfolk, Virginia, U.S.
- Occupations: Abolitionist, journalist, political organizer
- Children: Augustus Michael Hodges

Willis Augustus Hodges (February 12, 1815 – September 24, 1890) was an African-American abolitionist, journalist, and political organizer who became prominent in Brooklyn, New York. Born to free parents in Virginia, Hodges became an outspoken advocate for enslaved African Americans during the Antebellum period, giving aid to the Underground Railroad in the North after a move to New York, and collaborating with such notable figures as William Lloyd Garrison, John Brown and Frederick Douglass. He also published an antislavery newspaper, The Ram’s Horn.

Following the Civil War, when he served in the Union Army, Hodges was active in Reconstruction politics in Virginia, attending the State Constitutional Convention of Virginia as a delegate from 1867 to 1868. He returned to New York in 1881, after conservative whites regained dominance in Virginia.

== Birth and early life ==
Hodges was born in Princess Anne County, Virginia on February 12, 1815, to Charles Augustus Hodges, a free African American, and Julia Nelson Willis, a free woman of mixed-race descent. His father Charles was a landowner and a successful farmer, owning 200 acres of property and one slave by 1840. While Hodges later became a forceful opponent of slavery, his mother's origins led to his having also a lifelong concern for the free blacks in the South, who suffered many constraints. Hodges dedicated his autobiography to their plight. His brothers were antislavery activists Charles Edward Hodges (1819–after 1910) and William Johnson Hodges (?–1872).

== Antebellum abolitionist ==
When Willis was fourteen, his older brother William was arrested for antislavery agitation and thrown into jail. He escaped and fled to Canada, but the incident marked the Hodges family as pariahs in Princess Anne County. The young Hodges found himself the victim of mob violence on more than one occasion during this time. In the aftermath of the Nat Turner's Rebellion, the white legislature passed severe discriminatory measures against free blacks, fearing more uprisings.

Hodges left Virginia for New York in 1836. At the instigation of his sister, Hodges devoted himself to study. He also soon began attending antislavery meetings. Hodges quickly grew impatient with Northerners whom he viewed as being "more men of words than deeds," and became an impassioned advocate for the immediate abolition of slavery by any means necessary. He started a newspaper, The Ram's Horn, in the 1840s, and soon began to collaborate John Brown, an antislavery zealot. Brown notably organized the armed raid on the US armory in Harpers Ferry, Virginia in 1859.

== War and Reconstruction-era ==
During the Civil War, Hodges traveled to the South and served as a scout for the Union Army. He used his knowledge of Princess Anne County and the surrounding area to assist Federal forces in its occupation. At the conclusion of the war, Hodges returned to his boyhood home. He was chosen to represent Virginia at the constitutional convention of 1867–1868. The conventions of this period, mandated by the United States Congress, marked the "first time [blacks] sat alongside whites as lawmakers," both in Virginia and throughout the occupied South.

Because of Hodges' leading role at the convention, he was singled out for ridicule in the southern press. It was typically bitterly hostile to the role of African Americans in Reconstruction. Aligning with the Radical Republicans, Hodges supported the enfranchisement of blacks, demanded the disenfranchisement of former Confederates, and sought integration of public schools, established for the first time by biracial legislatures in the South. When conservative white Democrats regained dominance of government in Virginia, Hodges returned to New York in 1881. He revisited Virginia in later years.

== Death ==
Hodges died on September 24, 1890, in Norfolk, Virginia. He was seventy-five.

== Bibliography ==
- Foner, Eric. "Blueprints for a Republican South: The Constitutional Conventions." In Reconstruction: America's Unfinished Revolution, 316–33. New York: Harper Perennial Modern Classics, 2014.
- Hodges, Willis Augustus, and Willard B. Gatewood. Free Man of Color: The Autobiography of Willis Augustus Hodges. Knoxville: University of Tennessee Press, 1982.
- Kirk, Ian. "Hodges, Willis Augustus (1815-1890)." The Black Past: Remembered and Reclaimed. Accessed November 17, 2018. https://blackpast.org/aah/hodges-willis-augustus-1815-1890.
- Lowe, Richard. "William Augustus Hodges: "We Are Now Coming to New Things"." Edited by Steven Woodworth. In The Human Tradition in the Civil War and Reconstruction, 213-24. Wilmington, DE: Scholarly Resources Inc., 2000.
