= JoAnn Haysbert =

American educator and academic administrator (born 1948)

JoAnn W. Haysbert

First Chancellor, Executive Vice-President, and Provost of Hampton University
- Incumbent
- Assumed office Spring 2012

Fifteenth President of Langston University
- In office August 2005 – December 2011
- Preceded by: Ernest Holloway
- Succeeded by: Kent Smith

First Acting President of Hampton University
- In office Fall 2003 – Spring 2004

Provost of Hampton University
- In office Fall 1996 – Spring 2003
- Preceded by: Dr. Elnora Daniel
- Succeeded by: Dr. Calvin D. Jamison, Sr

Personal details
- Born: JoAnn Wright; September 22, 1948 (age 78) Kingstree, South Carolina, U.S.
- Spouse: Stanley Haysbert
- Children: Andre Wright, Ninevah Haysbert, Nazareth Haysbert, Jordan Haysbert, Samaria Haysbert
- Education: Johnson C. Smith University; Auburn University; Harvard University

JoAnn Haysbert (née Wright) is an American educator and academic administrator currently serving as Chancellor, Executive Vice-President and Provost of Hampton University in Hampton, Virginia. Previously, she served as Langston University's fifteenth and first female president, from 2005 to 2011, making her the first African-American female president of any institution of higher learning in the state of Oklahoma.

== Career ==
After receiving her Ed.D. from Auburn University, Haysbert held academic positions at the school, and also Virginia State University and Alexander City State Junior College, before her tenure at Hampton. She served in a variety of positions including its first acting president, provost, assistant provost, professor, coordinator of graduate programs, dean of freshman studies, assistant vice president for academic affairs, director of summer sessions, and director of the assessment and learning support center.

In 2005, after a 25-year career at Hampton, she succeeded Earnest Holloway to become Langston University's 15th president, serving through the end of 2011, when Kent Smith succeeded the post.

In 2012, she returned to Hampton to become its first Chancellor and Executive Vice-President, while also resuming her post as Provost.

== Biography ==
Born in Kingstree, South Carolina, in 1948, Haysbert is a graduate of Johnson C. Smith University (where she pledged Alpha Kappa Alpha, the first black college sorority in the U.S.), Auburn University, and the Harvard Graduate School of Education's Institute for Educational Management.

She married Stanley Haysbert, a real estate developer (brother of actor Dennis Haysbert and nephew of businessman Raymond V. Haysbert), in 1980, and has five children.
