= Beverly Gooden =

American writer and social activist

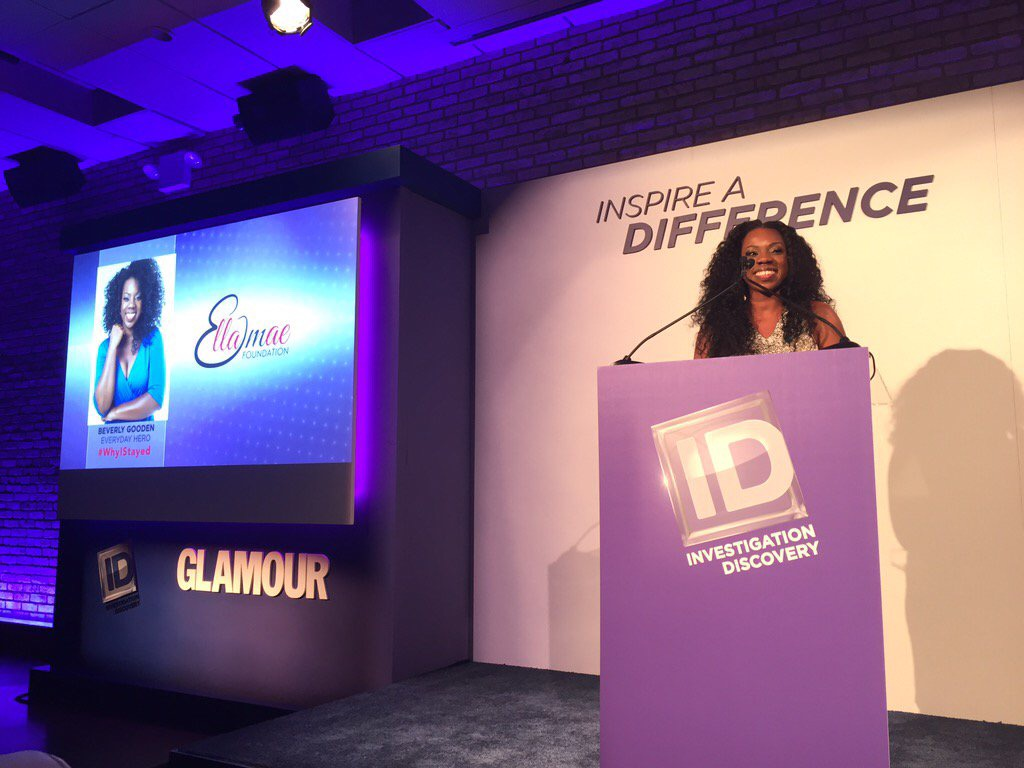
- Beverly Gooden receiving the Inspire A Difference Everyday Hero Award in New York, NY, 2015
- Born: November 24; Cleveland, Ohio, United States
- Education: Hampton University
- Website: www.beverlygooden.com

Beverly Gooden is an African American writer and social activist known for her work in domestic violence, victimology, and women's health, who created the Why I Stayed hashtag (#WhyIStayed) and movement in 2014. Her writing has appeared in The New York Times, the U.S. Office on Women's Health, and NBC's Today.

== Early life and education ==
Born in Cleveland, Ohio, Beverly lived in foster care until being adopted by the Gooden family as a child. As a sophomore at Hampton University, she was selected as a media scholar with the Summer Research Opportunities Program at the University of Iowa and researched the connection between alcohol advertisements and teen drinking and driving. During her junior year, she interned with the Scripps Howard Foundation Wire as a reporter on Capitol Hill, covering the Iraqi prisoner abuse scandal and NCAA recruiting reform. In 2005, she graduated with a bachelor's degree in journalism and communications. She went on to attend Loyola University Chicago and graduated with a master's degree in social justice in 2009.

== Activism ==
On September 8, 2014, Beverly created the hashtag #WhyIStayed in response to the Ray Rice video released by TMZ. A survivor of domestic violence, she tweeted several reasons why she remained in an abusive marriage as a direct response to widespread victim blaming of Janay Rice.

Two days later, Gooden was interviewed by Robin Roberts on Good Morning America, where she explained her motivations for creating the Why I Stayed movement. "The reason that I started the hashtag was to give voice to the people out there who had that voice taken away. I think what bothered me most was that the question was 'why did she stay?' and not 'why did he hit her?'. And we do this across the board with violent situations, we do this with domestic violence by asking 'why did she stay?' and we do this with rape by saying 'why did she wear that?' as if your clothing or your mere presence gives someone the right to hurt you."

She has been featured on Good Morning America, CNN, Time, The Washington Post, HLN, Inside Edition, NBC Nightly News, and more.

Why I Stayed was listed as one of the top social change hashtags of 2014 by Forbes, and one of the "top 10 hashtags that started a conversation" by Time magazine. In March 2015, Why I Stayed was recognized as one of "8 hashtags that changed the world".

=== The Bolt Bag Project ===
In 2014, Beverly founded the Ella Mae Foundation, which supports "protection and superior upbringing for children as well as self-actualization and equitable rights for women". She created the Bolt Bag Project, a program that provides basic necessities to anonymous survivors of relationship violence.

== Career ==
Gooden served as a development intern at the Chicago Alliance to End Homelessness during graduate school in 2008. After the 2008 financial crisis, she worked for various government and nonprofit agencies to secure or administer housing and food resources for those affected by the crisis. As a grant recipient of American Recovery and Reinvestment Act of 2009 funding while serving as continuum of care coordinator, she worked with organizations to find stable and affordable housing for families facing housing insecurity in Chicago; Hampton Roads, Virginia; and northwest Georgia.

=== Appearances ===
In September 2014, Gooden made guest appearances on the Dr. Phil show and in Verizon's 2014 Domestic Violence Summit at Paramount Studios in Los Angeles. In October 2015, she contributed a piece to the U.S. Office on Women's Health blog. She was also featured in the short film Why We Stayed by Emmy Award-nominated producers of Private Violence. She wrote an article, "Why We Stayed", for The New York Times, and appeared in the December 2015 issue of Redbook magazine. She was featured in the August 2016 issue of Glamour magazine; and appeared in a Toyota commercial discussing her work with the Ella Mae Foundation, sponsored by Investigation Discovery. She was featured in the September 2018 issue of Ebony magazine in an article titled "The Struggle To Get Out".

=== Honors and awards ===
Beverly was given the "Digital Champion" Heart of Courage award by the Mary Kay Foundation in October 2017. She was chosen by Investigation Discovery and Glamour magazine as the 2015 Inspire A Difference "Everyday Hero" award winner. She was honored at an event in New York City alongside Angie Harmon, Grace Gealey, and AnnaLynne McCord.

=== Book ===
Her memoir, Surviving: Why We Stay and How We Leave Abusive Relationships, is set for publication in spring 2022 by Rowman & Littlefield.

== Personal life ==
Gooden plays three musical instruments, and is an avid children's literature reader with a special interest in fantasy and folklore. She speaks openly about having a total hysterectomy after a decade of debilitating uterine fibroids. She lives in Houston, Texas.
