= Constance Hill Marteena =

American librarian and bibliographer

- Marteena in 1965
- Born: August 24, 1897 or 1903; Richmond, Virginia, U.S.
- Died: December 29, 1978; Greensboro, North Carolina, U.S.
- Occupation: librarian

Constance Hill Marteena (August 24, 1897/1903 – December 29, 1978) was an American librarian and author, known for her bibliographies about Black women.

== Early life and education ==
Marteena was born on August 24, 1897, or in 1903, in Richmond, Virginia. Her parents were Irene Robinson Hill and Reuben T. Hill. She attended Hartshorn Memorial College and earned her B.S. degree from Hampton Institute in 1933. She studied library science at the Graduate Library School of the University of Chicago, and received a Master of Arts degree in 1946. She worked as director of public information at North Carolina Agricultural and Technical State University from 1929 to 1937 where she was also a founding member of the Alpha Phi chapter of the Alpha Kappa Alpha sorority in 1931.

== Career ==
Marteena was president of the North Carolina Negro Library Association (NCNLA) from 1952 through 1954, and helped guide its merger with the North Carolina Library Association, which ended the segregation of professional library associations in North Carolina.

Through NCNLA, she published the printed resource Achievements of Afro-American women of the twentieth century: a checklist in 1949. This built on her previous publication, A bibliographic technique illustrated in the compilation of a selective guide to the literature of Afro-American women of achievement, which was published in 1946. She also authored the book The Lengthening Shadow of a Woman: A Biography of Charlotte Hawkins Brown about the woman who founded the Palmer Memorial Institute. Marteena was an advocate for women's education stating, "when you educate a woman you educate a family."

Marteena worked at Bennett College from 1937 until 1967, retiring as director of the Thomas F. Holgate Library in Greensboro, North Carolina. She was an instructor in the college's teacher-librarian certification program and worked on a library collection on African-American women. The special collections room was named in her honor in 1978.

Marteena died on December 29, 1978, in Greensboro.
