= Rashida Jones (television executive) =

American television executive

- Born: Rashida Adkins; 1980 or 1981 (age 44–45)
- Education: Hampton University (BA)
- Title: Former president of MSNBC

Rashida Jones (née Adkins; born 1980 or 1981) is an American business executive who is the chief executive officer (CEO) of the content company Uncensored. Jones was the former president of the cable news network MSNBC. She is the first black woman to lead a major cable news network.

== Early life and education ==
Jones was born to Richard and Alice Adkins, the oldest of three children. She grew up in York, Pennsylvania. The family later moved to Richmond, Virginia, where she attended Henrico High School and became editor of the student newspaper.

Jones attended Hampton University, majoring in broadcast journalism. She graduated from Hampton with a BA degree in Mass Media Arts in 2002. In 2022, Jones established a scholarship fund in her name at Hampton University for journalism students.

== Career ==
In 2002, while a senior in college, she worked as a morning show producer at WTKR in Norfolk, Virginia. After several years there, she moved to The Weather Channel as a weekend producer, and became director of live programming in 2009.

Jones later worked at WIS-TV in Columbia, South Carolina, as news director, then moved to New York City as an executive producer for daytime shows at MSNBC. Later roles included managing editor at MSNBC and senior vice president of specials for NBC News and MSNBC, in which she managed dayside and weekend news programming on MSNBC, as well as leading coverage of breaking news and major events across NBC News and MSNBC. Jones expanded the town-hall concept to a wider audience, including a criminal justice special filmed at Sing Sing correctional facility. While a senior vice president at NBC News and MSNBC, she led a shift from election coverage to a focus on COVID-19.

On February 1, 2021, Jones succeeded Phil Griffin as the president of MSNBC and became the first African-American woman to run a major cable news network. On January 14, 2025, she resigned from the network, which was preparing to be spun off from NBCUniversal into Versant. Jones continued at the network in an advisory role until March 2025.

In April 2025, Jones joined the Board of Trustees for Hampton University. In 2026, Jones began a two-year term as a director for the Alliance for Women in Media National Board of Directors and Officers.

Jones became the CEO of Uncensored, a content company founded by Piers Morgan, in March 2026.

== Honors and awards ==
- Jones is a member of the Scripps Howard School of Journalism and Communications Hall of Fame.
- In 2020, she was named in Variety's 2020 New York Women's Impact Report
- In October, 2022, Jones was the inaugural recipient of the Media Leadership Award from Montclair State University School of Communication and Media.
- In February, 2023, Jones was awarded the Achievement of Excellence Award from Scripps Howard School of Journalism & Communications at Hampton University and headlined the institution's 20th anniversary celebration.
- Jones received the Radio Television Digital News Foundation's Leonard Zeidenberg First Amendment Award on March 2, 2023.
- Jones received an honorary doctorate for "her exceptional contributions to the field of journalism and her steadfast commitment to educating and mentoring future generations" from the University of the District of Columbia on May 11, 2024.

== Personal life ==
Jones is divorced and has two children, a son and daughter. Her partner is Edward Fisher, the community and government relations executive at American University. She became an honorary member of Delta Sigma Theta sorority in 2023.
