= Nupol Kiazolu =

American activist

- Born: June 12, 2000 (age 26); Brooklyn, New York City
- Citizenship: American
- Education: Hampton University
- Known for: Civil rights activism

Nupol Kiazolu (born June 12, 2000) is an American activist and founder of Vote 2000. Kiazolu is an advocate for civil rights, domestic and sexual violence survivors, and homelessness.

== Early life and education ==
Kiazolu grew up in Brownsville, Brooklyn with her single mother. They lived in a homeless shelter. Kiazolu began her activist activities at the age of twelve, following the killing of Trayvon Martin in 2012, an event which also sparked the birth of the Black Lives Matter movement. Kiazolu showed up to her middle school wearing a hoodie with the message "Do I look suspicious?" taped to the back, as well as picking up some skittles and an iced tea from 7-11 to represent what Trayvon Martin was carrying when he was killed. She faced opposition from school staff, and was sent to the principal's office and threatened with a suspension if she would not remove the hoodie. With the support of her math teacher, she confronted the principal, who ultimately decided to allow Kiazolu to state her case. Kiazolu cited the Supreme Court case "Tinker vs. Des Moines" and earned the right to wear her hoodie at school. Kiazolu cited this interaction with a senior school official who allowed her to take part in an official form of activism as a defining moment for her: "At that moment, I knew being an activist and organizer was my calling."

Kiazolu is a full-time student at Hampton University studying political science and pre-law. She was a member of Alpha Kappa Alpha sorority.

== Career ==
In 2017, Kiazolu founded Vote 2000, a campaign focused on increasing the effort to get more young people of color registered to vote. She partnered with the website DoSomething.org with the goal of registering 100,000 new voters.

In August 2017, Kiazolu participated in the counterprotest against the "Unite the Right" rally held in Charlottesville. She cites her motivations as needing to boost the number of counterprotestors. She encountered members of Neo-Nazi groups and the KKK and was subjected to tear gas attacks. She was also assaulted by a KKK member, and fled the protest after the death of Heather Hayer.

In 2019, Kiazolu competed in and won the Miss Liberia USA beauty pageant under the platform of uniting African and African American communities and raising awareness and funds for infrastructure, education and healthcare in Liberia.

In May 2020 after the murder of George Floyd, Kiazolu went to Minnesota to help coordinate the Black Lives Matter resistance efforts. On July 14, 2020, Kiazolu was arrested in Louisville, Kentucky while protesting at the home of state attorney general Daniel Cameron following the death of Breonna Taylor. She was released the next day.

== Activism ==
Kiazolu views political polarization as the biggest threat to free speech in America.

She aspires to run for the US presidency in the year 2036, where she hopes to reframe how the country thinks about key issues, including racism and homelessness. Kiazolu states: "I want to see a more equitable and just America where your success isn't determined by your zip code or locality."
