= DiGiorno =

Brand name of frozen pizza by Nestlé

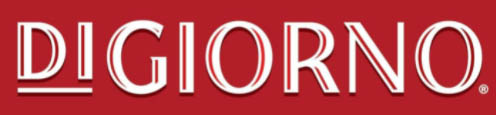

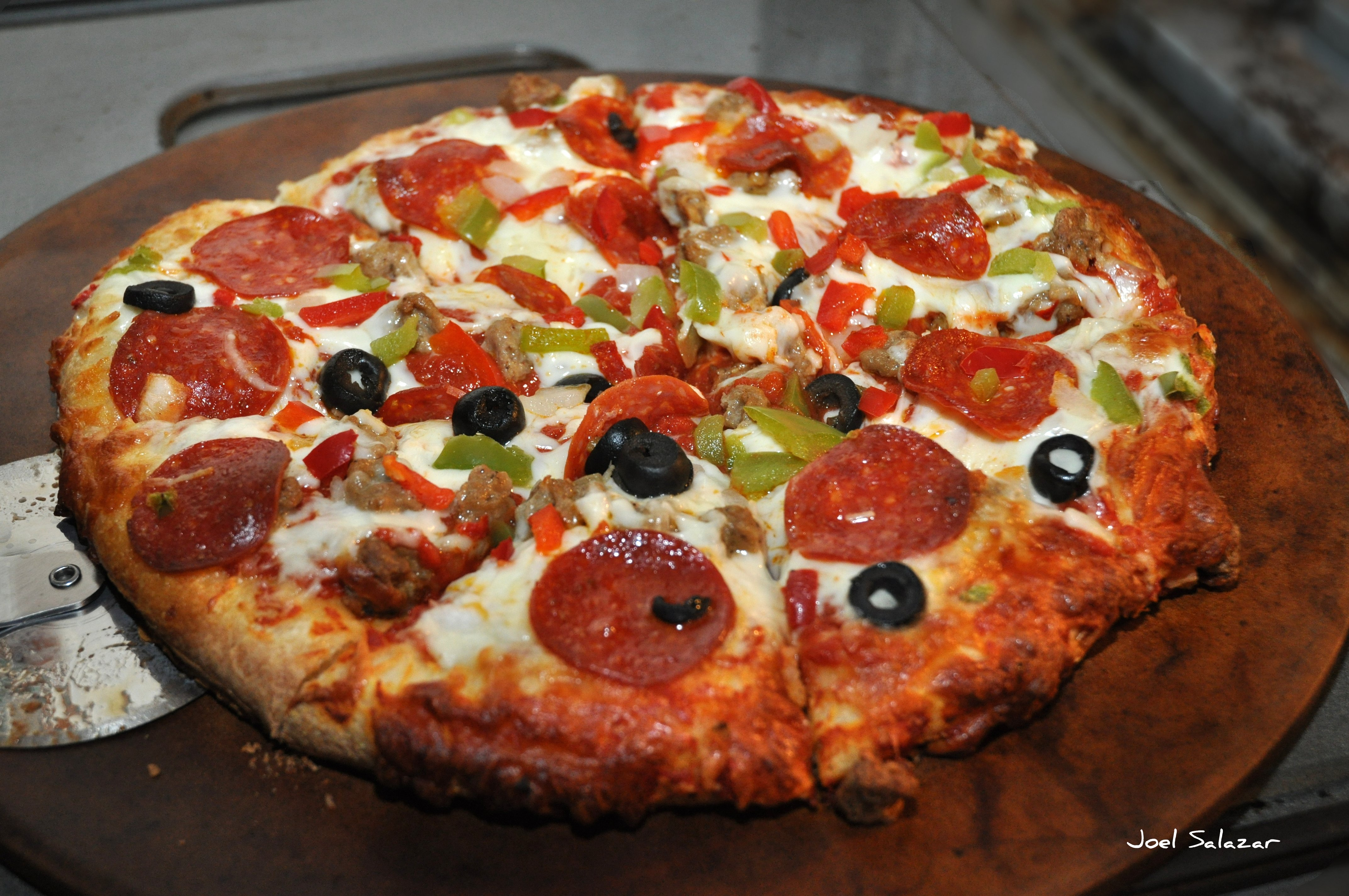
- Product type: Pizza
- Current owner: Nestlé
- Country: United States
- Introduced: 1991
- Discontinued: 2023 (Canada only)
- Markets: United States; Canada (until 2023)
- Tagline: "It's not delivery. It's DiGiorno."
- Website: goodnes.com/digiorno

DiGiorno (previously sold in Canada as Delissio) is a brand of frozen pizzas sold in the United States, and is a subsidiary of Nestlé. In 2023, Delissio pizzas were discontinued in Canada.

== Description ==
DiGiorno manufactures over 250,000 pizzas each day for consumers for national sale in the mainland United States. Total revenue from pizza sales in 2017 was just over $1 billion. The DiGiorno product line originally offered pastas and sauces in 1991, and pizzas have been available in the U.S. since 1995, and were formerly sold in Canada.

The brand's slogan is "It's not delivery. It's DiGiorno/Delissio," which suggests that their frozen pizzas are of high enough quality that they might be mistaken for fresh pizzeria pizzas. DiGiorno rebranded to Delissio in Canada in 1999, although Kraft had previously used the Delissio brand for other pizza products in the 1980s.

In 2010, Kraft sold the DiGiorno and Delissio brands, along with the rest of its frozen pizza business, to Swiss-based food manufacturer Nestlé. The move helped to finance Kraft's bid for Cadbury, while also effectively ensuring that Nestlé would not submit a competing bid for the confectionery company. Since Nestlé acquired Kraft's frozen pizza business, the DiGiorno brand has expanded to include bonus appetizers in a box, including breadsticks, boneless chicken pieces called Wyngz, and Toll House cookies.

In 2013, DiGiorno's dairy supplier, Foremost Farms USA, dropped Wiese Brothers Farm after the animal rights organization Mercy for Animals released undercover footage showing workers there beating, dragging, and whipping dairy cows, some of which appear unable to walk, while others have infected or freely bleeding wounds. Nestlé and Foremost Farms USA denied any knowledge of the abuse.

== History ==
In 2013, DiGiorno had reached a four-year low sales growth, and the company decided to sell some of its assets to revamp its portfolio. However, the frozen food market is expected to grow globally, despite the continued demand for organic food and healthy diet. Following this optimistic news, the executive vice president of Nestle expressed his high hopes in the future growth of DiGiorno. Later that year, DiGiorno announced that it would launch the "Design A Pizza Kit," a customizable pizza which included a cheese pizza with individually wrapped meats, vegetables, shredded cheese and a seasoning packet.

In May 2018, DiGiorno took part in a social media competition campaign run by internet entertainers Kinda Funny titled "1st Annual Best Friend Tournament". The Twitter poll–based competition saw DiGiorno beating competition such as Napa Smith Gallery, Portillo's Restaurants and Oreo. The frozen pizza brand reached the semifinals where they were narrowly beaten by Rooster Teeth employee Barbara Dunkelman, who received 55% of 72,820 votes cast.

In February 2023, Nestle Canada announced their intentions to wind down and exit the frozen meals and pizza business within the next six months.

== Social media controversy ==
After #WhyIStayed became a trending topic on Twitter, it was mistakenly used by the DiGiorno's Pizza Twitter handle as a marketing effort. They tweeted, "#WhyIStayed You had pizza." The administrator for the account later apologized for the mistake, claiming that no one had looked into the implication of the trending hashtag before taking to Twitter. While many Twitter users brushed over the error, others were deeply angered as they believed DiGiorno was making light of an incredibly serious topic. In response, DiGiorno answered numerous negative tweets with personal messages conveying their apologies. DiGiorno has since removed the original tweet.

== See also ==
- List of frozen food brands
