= Hampton University =

Historically Black university in Hampton, Virginia, US

- Former names: Hampton Normal and Agricultural Institute (1868–1930); Hampton Institute (1930–1984)
- Motto: "The Standard of Excellence, An Education for Life"
- Type: Private historically Black research university
- Established: September 17, 1861; 165 years ago
- Affiliations: Big South Conference; MAISA
- Academic affiliations: Space-grant
- Endowment: $280.6 million (2020)
- Chancellor: JoAnn Haysbert
- President: Darrell K. Williams
- Provost: JoAnn Haysbert
- Students: 4,686 (fall 2026)
- Undergraduates: 4,046 (fall 2026)
- Postgraduates: 606 (fall 2026)
- Doctoral students: 36 (fall 2026)
- Location: Hampton, Virginia, U.S. 37°01′21″N 76°20′05″W
- Campus: Suburban, 314 acres (127 ha)
- Newspaper: The Hampton Script
- Colors: Blue & white
- Nickname: Pirates and Lady Pirates
- Sporting affiliations: NCAA Division I (FCS) – CAA; CAA Football
- Website: home.hamptonu.edu

Hampton University is a private, historically black, research university in Hampton, Virginia, United States. Founded in 1868 as Hampton Agricultural and Industrial Institute, it was established by Black and White leaders of the American Missionary Association after the American Civil War to provide education to freedmen. The campus houses the Hampton University Museum, which is the oldest museum of the African diaspora in the United States and the oldest museum in the commonwealth of Virginia. First led by former Union General Samuel Chapman Armstrong, Hampton University's main campus is located on 314 acres (127 ha) in Hampton, Virginia, on the banks of the Hampton River.

The university offers bachelor's, master's, and doctoral programs. The university has a satellite campus in Virginia Beach and also has online offerings. Hampton University is home to 16 research centers, including the Hampton University Proton Therapy Institute, the largest free-standing facility of its kind in the world. Hampton University is classified among "R2: Doctoral Universities – High research activity".

== History ==
The campus was founded on the grounds of "Little Scotland", a former plantation in Elizabeth City County that is located on the Hampton River. It overlooked Hampton Roads and was not far from Fortress Monroe and the Grand Contraband Camp, that gathered formerly enslaved men and women who sought refuge with Union forces in the South during the first year of the war. Their facilities represented freedom.

In 1861 the American Missionary Association (AMA) responded to the former slaves' need for education and hired Mary Smith Peake as its first teacher at the camp. She had already secretly been teaching slaves and free Black people in the area despite the state's legal prohibition. She first taught for the AMA on September 17, 1861, and was said to gather her pupils under a large oak. In 1863 the Emancipation Proclamation was read here—the first place in the Confederate states. From then on the big tree was called the Emancipation Oak. The tree, now a symbol of both the university and of the city, survives as part of the designated National Historic Landmark District at Hampton University.

The Hampton Agricultural and Industrial School, later called the Hampton Institute, was founded in 1868 after the war by the biracial leadership of the American Missionary Association, who were chiefly Congregational and Presbyterian ministers. It was first led by former Union General Samuel Chapman Armstrong. Among the school's famous alumni is Booker T. Washington, an educator who was hired as the first principal at the Tuskegee Institute, which he developed for decades.

=== Civil War ===
During the American Civil War (1861–1865), Union-held Fortress Monroe in southeastern Virginia at the mouth of Hampton Roads became a gathering point and safe haven of sorts for fugitive slaves. The commander, General Benjamin F. Butler, determined they were "contraband of war", to protect them from being returned to slaveholders, who clamored to reclaim them. As numerous individuals sought freedom behind Union lines, the Army arranged for the construction of the Grand Contraband Camp nearby, from materials reclaimed from the ruins of Hampton, which had been burned by the retreating Confederate Army. This area was later called "Slabtown".

Hampton University traces its roots to Mary S. Peake, who began in 1861 with outdoor classes for freedmen, whom she taught under what is now the landmark Emancipation Oak in the nearby area of Elizabeth City County. In 1863 the newly issued Emancipation Proclamation was read to a gathering under the historic tree there.

=== After the War: teaching teachers ===
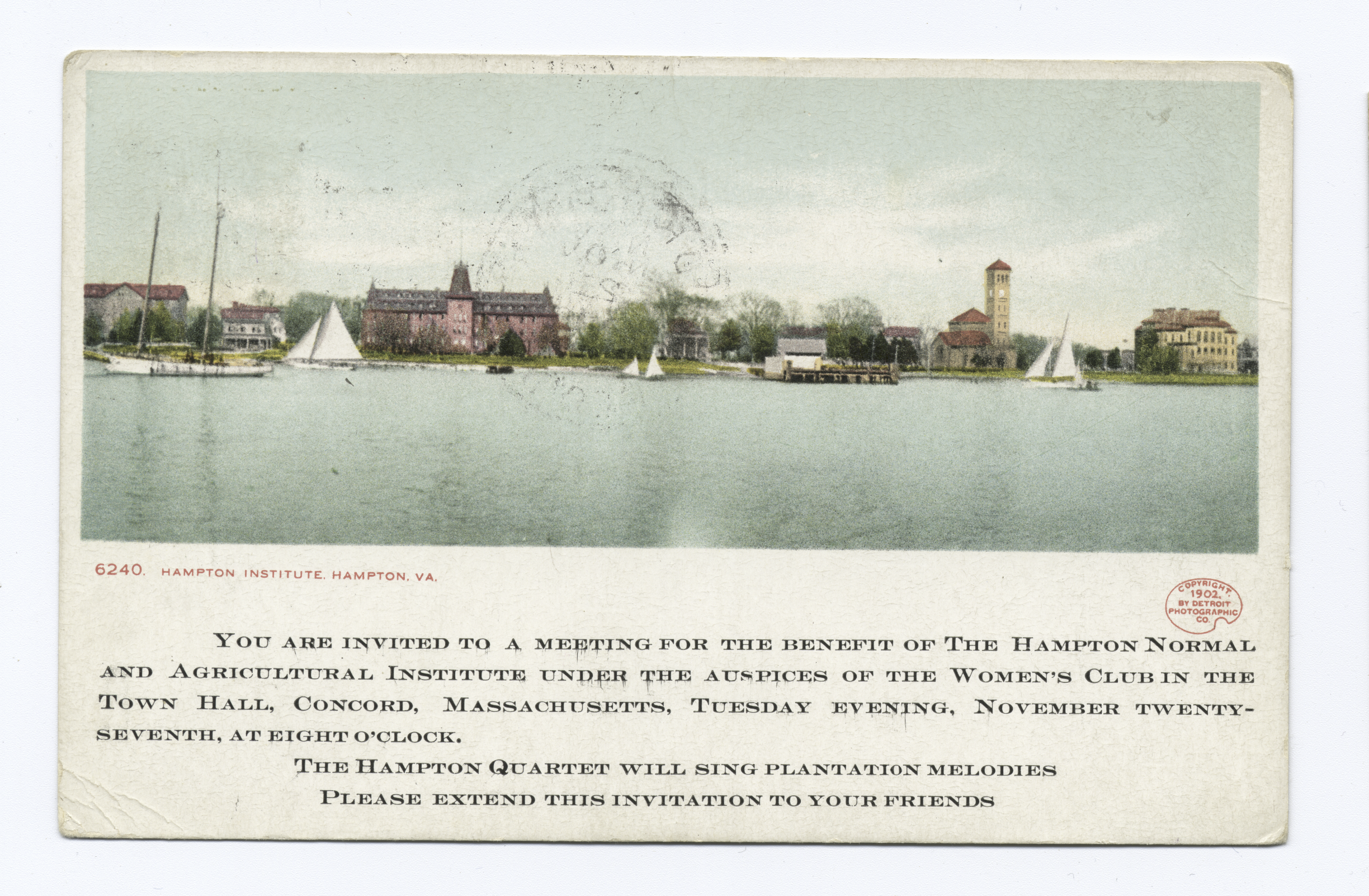
The Hampton Institute, 1898

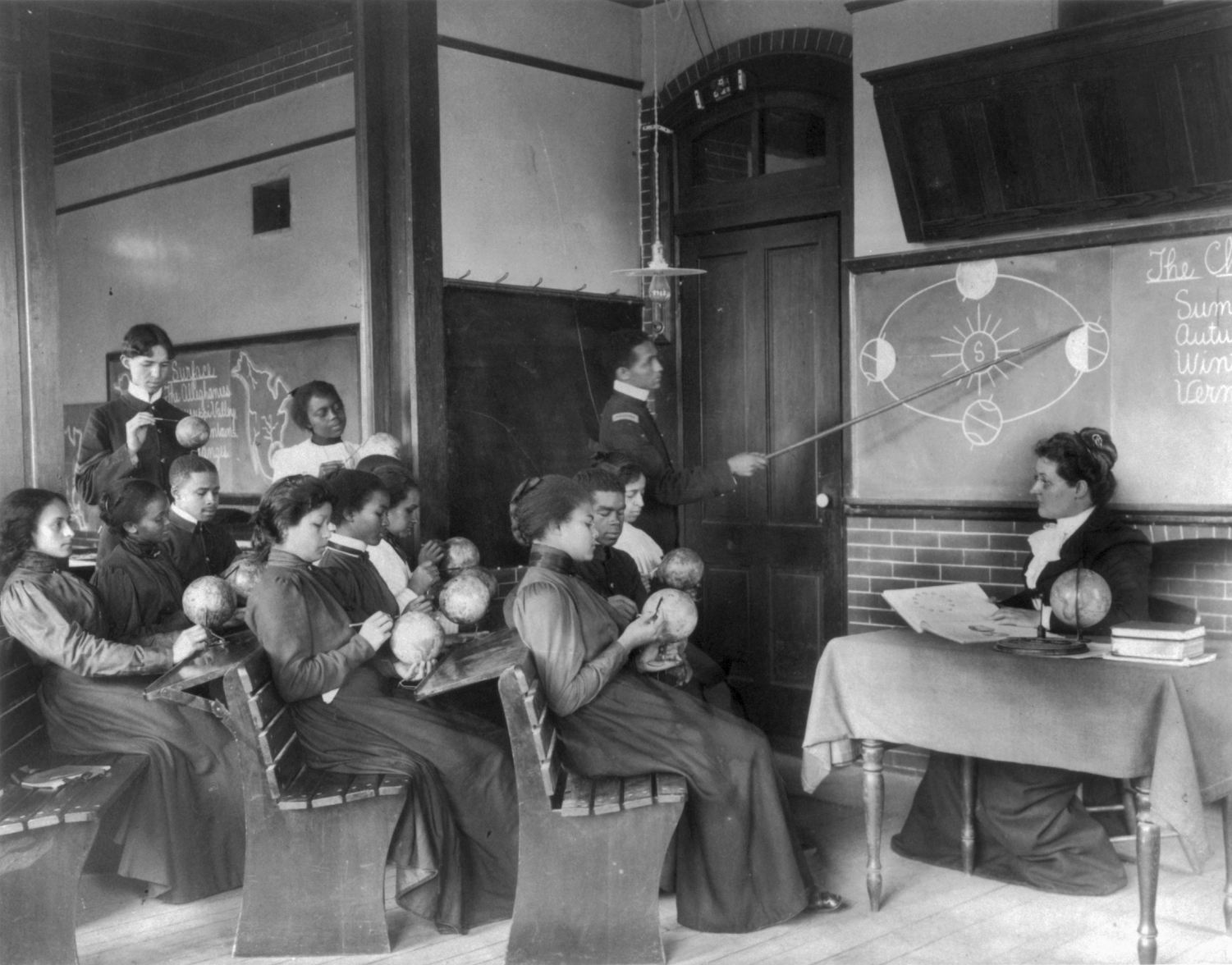
An 1899 class in mathematical geography

After the War, a normal school (teacher training school) was formalized in 1868, with former Union brevet Brigadier General Samuel C. Armstrong (1839–1893) as its first principal. The new school was established on the grounds of a former plantation named "Little Scotland", which had a view of Hampton Roads. The original school buildings fronted the Hampton River. Legally chartered in 1870 as a land grant school, it was first known as Hampton Normal and Agricultural Institute.

Typical of historically Black colleges, Hampton received much of its financial support in the years following the Civil War from the American Missionary Association (whose Black and white leaders represented the Congregational and Presbyterian churches), other church groups, and former officers and soldiers of the Union Army. One of the many Civil War veterans who gave substantial sums to the school was General William Jackson Palmer, a Union cavalry commander from Philadelphia. He later built the Denver and Rio Grande Western Railroad, and founded Colorado Springs, Colorado. As the Civil War began in 1861, although his Quaker upbringing made Palmer abhor violence, his passion to see the slaves freed compelled him to enter the war. He was awarded the Medal of Honor for bravery in 1894. (The current Palmer Hall on the campus is named in his honor.)

In 1872 Thomas P. Fenner was hired by Armstrong to create and lead the Hampton Singers (then known as the Hampton Jubilee Singers) in response to the tremendous financial success of the Fisk Jubilee Singers 1871 concert tour. Armstrong hoped that a similar choir at Hampton could also raise money for the financially struggling school. Fenner and the choir toured widely and were able to raise enough money through concerts to pay for the construction of Virginia Hall, the first dormitory for women at the Hampton Institute. Further funds raised by the choir in the 1870s were responsible for stabilizing the school's finances overall and prevented the school from closing.

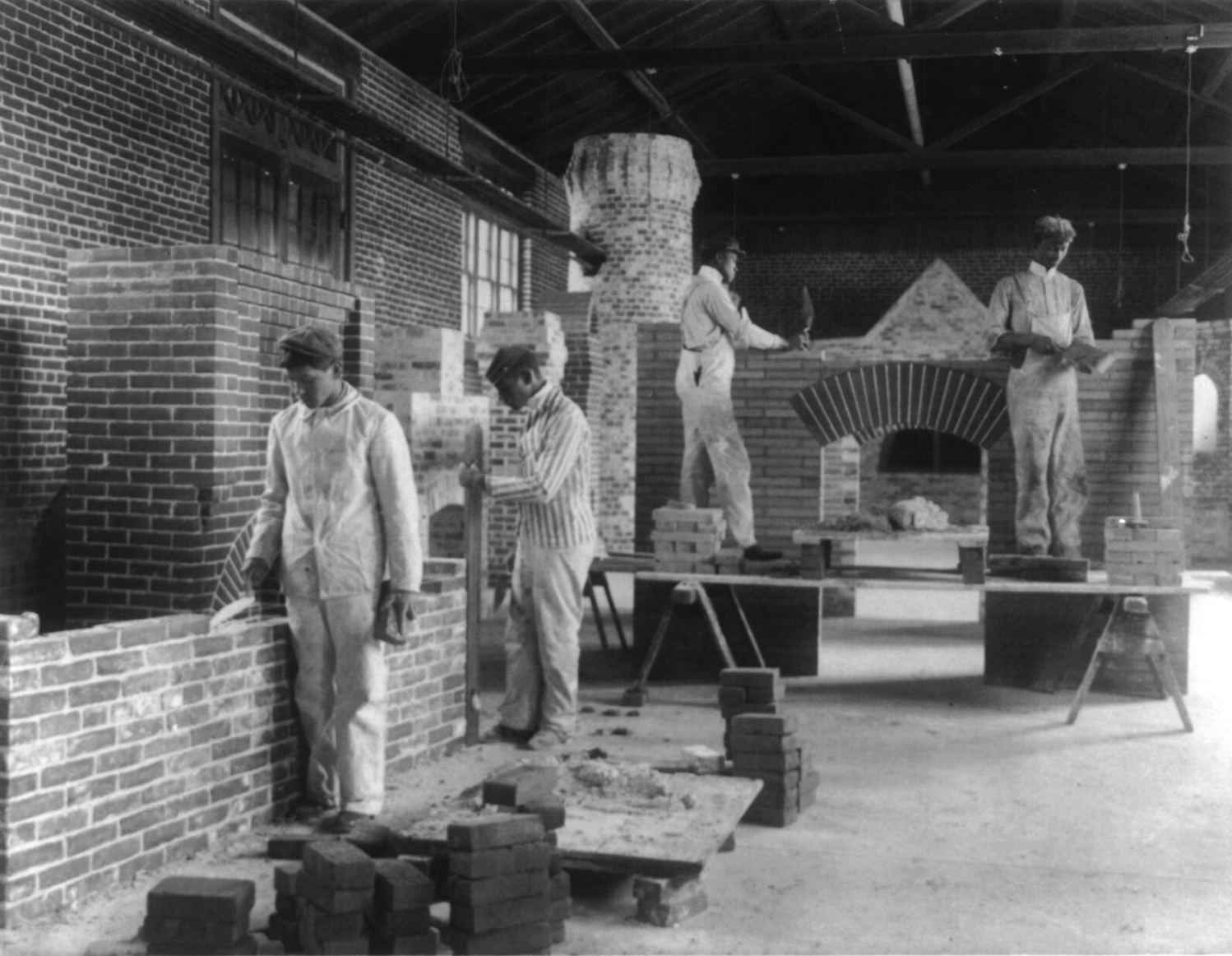
Students in an 1899 bricklaying class

Unlike the wealthy Palmer, Sam Armstrong was the son of a missionary to the Sandwich Islands (which later became the U.S. state of Hawaii). He also had dreams for the betterment of the freedmen. He patterned his new school after the model of his father, who had overseen the teaching of reading, writing and arithmetic to the Polynesians. He wanted to teach the skills necessary for Blacks to be self-supporting in the impoverished South. Under his guidance, a Hampton-style education became well known as an education that combined cultural uplift with moral and manual training. Armstrong said it was an education that encompassed "the head, the heart, and the hands".

At the close of its first decade, the school reported a total admission in those ten years of 927 students, with 277 graduates, all but 17 of whom had become teachers. Many of them had bought land and established themselves in homes; many were farming as well as teaching; some had gone into business. Only a very small proportion failed to do well. By another 10 years, there had been over 600 graduates. In 1888, of the 537 still alive, three-fourths were teaching, and about half as many undergraduates were also teaching. It was estimated that 15,000 children in community schools were being taught by Hampton's students and alumni that year.

After Armstrong's death, Hampton's leaders continued to develop a highly successful external relations program that forged a network of devoted supporters. By 1900, Hampton was the wealthiest school serving African Americans, largely due to its success in development and fundraising.

Hampton also had the only library school in the United States for educating Black librarians. The Hampton Institute Library School opened in 1925 and through its Negro Teacher-Librarian Program (NTLTP) trained and issued professional degrees to 183 Black librarians. The library school closed in 1939.

=== Booker T. Washington: spreading the educational work ===
Among Hampton's earliest students was Booker T. Washington, who arrived from West Virginia in 1872 at the age of 16. He worked his way through Hampton, and then went on to attend Wayland Seminary in Washington, D.C. After graduation, he returned to Hampton and became a teacher. Upon Armstrong's recommendation to the founder of a small school in Tuskegee, Alabama, established six years before, in 1881 the 25-year-old Washington went there to strengthen it and develop it to the status of a normal school, one recognized as being able to produce qualified teachers.

This new institution eventually became Tuskegee University. Embracing much of Armstrong's philosophy, Washington built Tuskegee into a substantial school and became nationally famous as an educator, orator, and fund-raiser as well. He collaborated with the philanthropist Julius Rosenwald in the early 20th century to create a model for rural Black schools; Rosenwald established a fund that matched monies raised by communities to build more than 5,000 schools for rural Black children, mostly in the South. In 1888 Washington recruited his Hampton classmate Charles W. Greene to Tuskegee to lead the Agriculture Department. Together they enticed George Washington Carver to the Tuskegee Agriculture faculty upon his graduation with a master's degree from Iowa State University in 1896.

Carver provided such technical strength in agriculture that, in 1900, Washington assigned Greene to establish a demonstration of Black business capability and economic independence off-campus in Tuskegee. This project, entirely Black-owned, comprised 4,000 lots of real estate and was formally established and designated Greenwood in 1901, as a demonstration for Black-owned business and residential districts in every city in the nation with a significant Black population. After Washington visited Tulsa, Oklahoma, in 1905 and addressed a large gathering there, the Oklahomans followed the Tuskegee model and named Tulsa's Black-owned and operated district "Greenwood" in 1906.

=== Native Americans ===
In 1878, Hampton established a formal education program for Native Americans to accommodate men who had been held as prisoners of war. In 1875 at the end of the American Indian Wars, the United States Army sent seventy-two warriors from the Cheyenne, Kiowa, Comanche and Caddo Nations, to imprisonment and exile in St. Augustine, Florida. Essentially they were used as hostages to persuade their peoples in the West to keep peace. Lieutenant Richard Henry Pratt supervised them at Fort Marion and began to arrange for their education in the English language and American culture.

St. Augustine was attracting numerous visitors from the North as it became known as a winter resort. Many became interested in the Native Americans held at Fort Marion and volunteered as teachers. They also provided the men with art supplies. Some of the men created what is now known as ledger art in this period. Some of the resulting works (including by David Pendleton Oakerhater) are held by the Smithsonian Institution.

At the end of the warriors' incarceration, Pratt convinced seventeen of the younger men to enroll at Hampton Institute for additional education. He also recruited additional Native American students: a total of seventy Native Americans, young men and women from various tribes, mostly from the Plains rather than the acculturated tribes of Virginia, joined that first class. Because Virginia's First Families sometimes boasted of their Native American heritage through Pocahontas, some supporters hoped that the Native American students would help locals to accept the institute's Black students. The Black students were also supposed to help "civilize" the Native American students to current American society, and the Native Americans to "uplift the Negro[es]".

The Red Moon was a theatrical show featuring a fictionalized version of the school.

In 1923, in the face of growing controversy over racial mingling, after the former Confederate states had disenfranchised Blacks and imposed Jim Crow, the Native American program ended. Native Americans stopped sending their boys to the school after some employers fired Native American men because they had been educated with Blacks. The program's final director resigned because she could not prevent "amalgamation" between the Native American girls and Black boys.

=== Name changes, expansion, and community ===
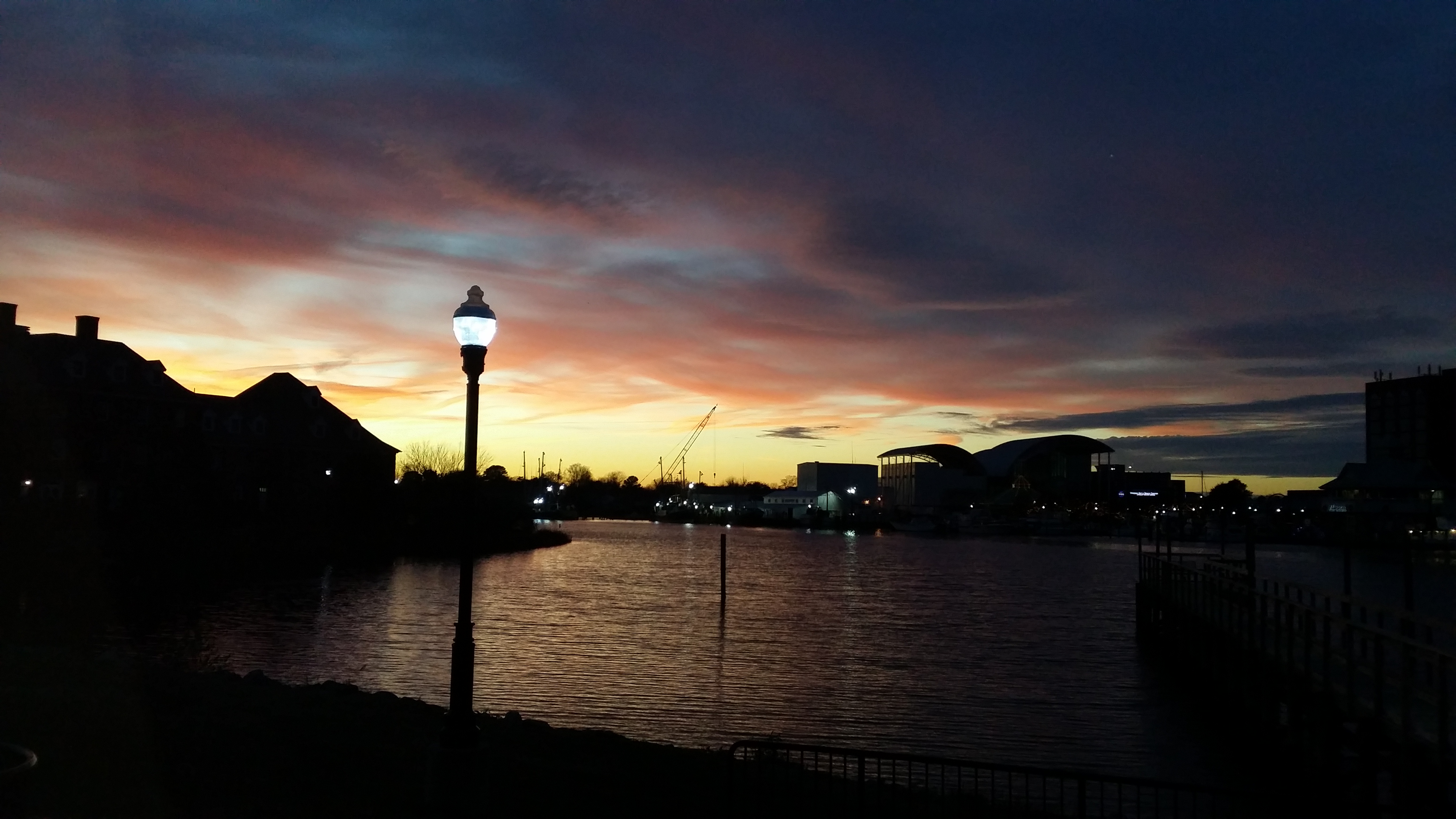
Sunset at Hampton University waterfront

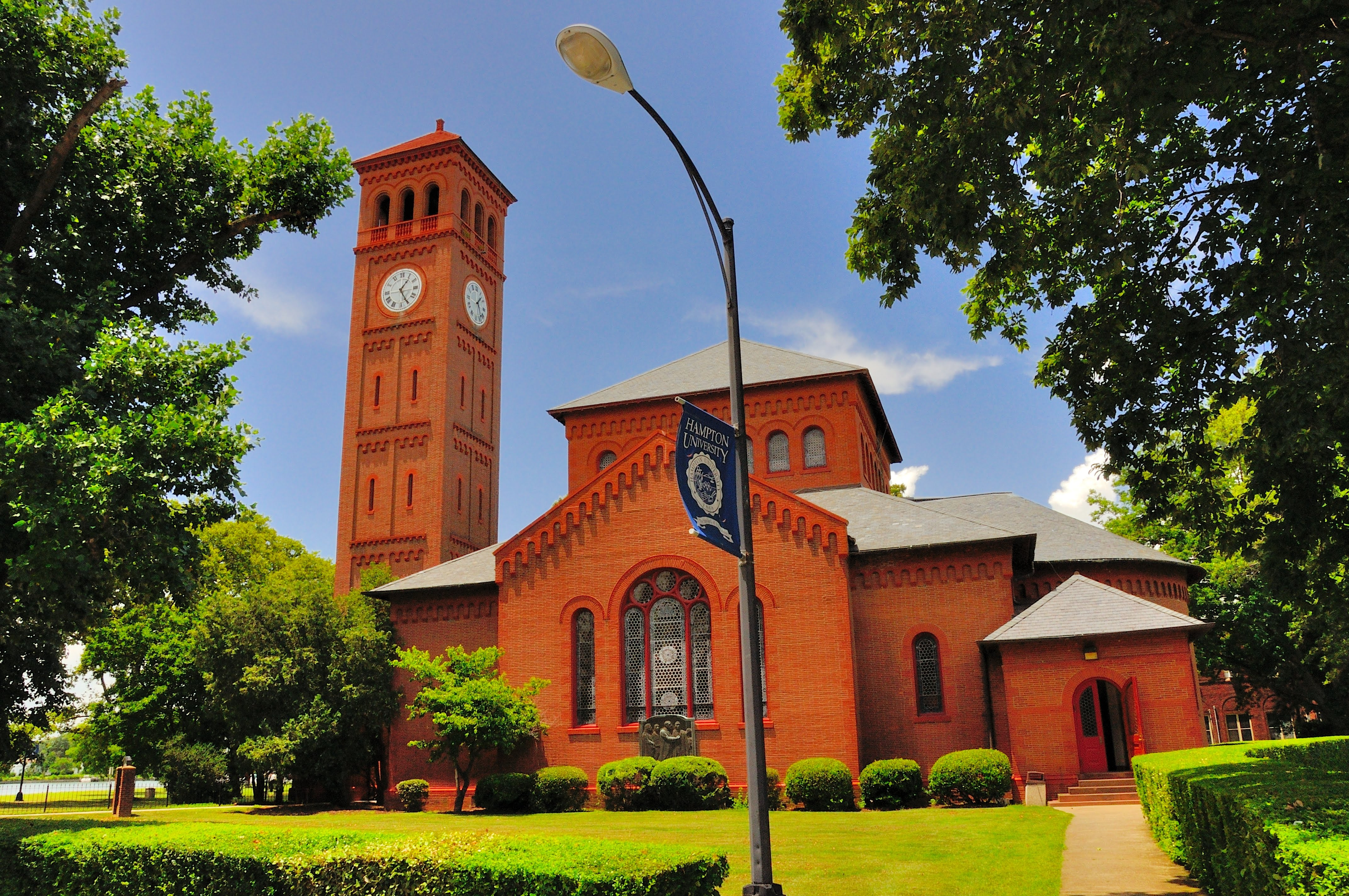
Hampton University Monroe Memorial Church

Hampton Normal and Agricultural Institute became simply Hampton Institute in 1930. In 1931 the George P. Phenix School for all age groups was opened there under principal Ian Ross. A new nurses' training school was attached to the Dixie Hospital, with Nina Gage as director. In 1945 the Austrian-American psychologist, art educator, and author of the influential text book Creative and Mental Growth Viktor Lowenfeld joined the Hampton faculty as an assistant professor of industrial arts and eventually became chair of the Art Department. By 1971 the university offered 42 evening classes in programs including "Educational Psychology", "Introduction to Oral Communication", "Modern Mathematics", and "Playwriting", among others. At the time, the tuition cost for these courses was $30 per semester hour.

In 1951, a 20-year-old student Benjamin Leroy Wigfall of Richmond, Virginia, became the youngest person ever to have a painting purchased by the Virginia Museum of the Fine Arts for $30 (~$372.00 in 2025). The abstract painting was titled Chimneys.

With the addition of departments and graduate programs, it became Hampton University in 1984. Originally located in Elizabeth City County, it was long-located in the Town of Phoebus, incorporated in 1900. Phoebus and Elizabeth City County were consolidated with the neighboring City of Hampton to form a much larger independent city in 1952. The City of Hampton uses the Emancipation Oak on its official seal. From 1960 to 1970, noted diplomat and educator Jerome H. Holland was president of the Hampton Institute.

The university and its leadership has also been met with criticism. In 2018, Hampton University students launched a protest calling for the administration to address several concerns they believed to be longstanding and urgent, including food quality, living conditions and the handling of sexual assault complaints. The university released a statement indicating that it was "moving forward" to address student concerns and issues.

In July 2020, philanthropist MacKenzie Scott donated $30 million (~$36.7 million in 2025) to Hampton. The donation is the largest single gift in Hampton's history. Hampton's president has sole discretion on how funds will be used but has committed to consulting with other university leaders on the best way to allocate the generous donation. Also in 2020, Hampton's School of Pharmacy lost accreditation due to failure of compliance to standards. The university soon after sued the accreditation agency citing lack of due process but in 2022 the lawsuit was dismissed and loss of accreditation upheld.

In June 2022, William R. Harvey retired as the 12th president of Hampton University after 43 years of service. He is the longest serving president in Hampton's history and one of the longest serving college presidents in the nation. He is succeeded by Darrell K. Williams who is a 1983 graduate of Hampton University.

== Presidents ==
- Samuel Chapman Armstrong (1868 to 1893)
- Hollis B. Frissell (1893 to 1917)
- James Edgar Gregg (1918 to 1929)
- George Perley Phenix (1930)
- Arthur Howe (1930 to 1940)
- Malcolm Shaw MacLean (1940 to 1943)
- Ralph P. Bridgeman (1944 to 1948)
- Alonzo G. Morón (1949 to 1959)
- Jerome H. Holland (1960 to 1970)
- Roy Davage Hudson (1970 to 1976)
- Carl McClellan Hill (1977 to 1978)
- William R. Harvey (1978 to 2022)
- Darrell K. Williams (2022 to present)

== Campus ==
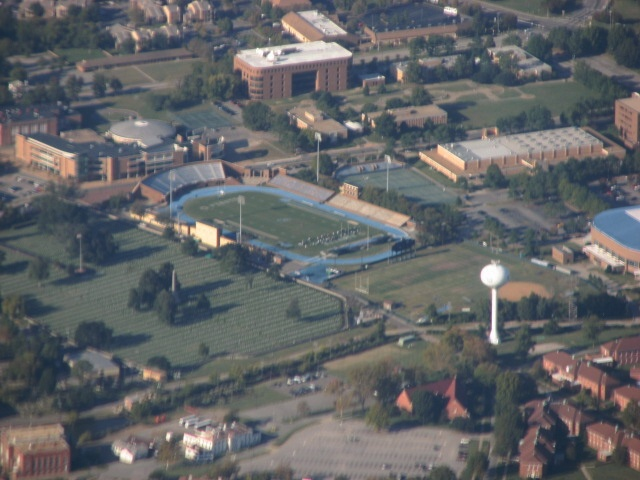
An aerial view of Hampton University

The campus contains several buildings that contribute to its National Historic Landmark district: Virginia-Cleveland Hall (freshman female dormitory, as well as former home to the school's two cafeterias), Wigwam building (home to administrative offices), Academy Building (administrative offices), Memorial Chapel (religious services) and the President's Mansion House.

The original High School on the campus became Phenix Hall when Hampton City Public Schools opened a new Phenix High School in 1962. Phenix Hall was damaged in a minor fire on June 12, 2008.

The Hampton University Museum was founded in 1868 and is the nation's oldest African-American museum. The museum contains over 9,000 pieces, some of which are highly acclaimed.

Hampton University is home to 16 research centers. The Hampton University Proton Therapy Institute is the largest free-standing facility of its kind in the world.

The four libraries on campus are the William R. and Norma B. Harvey Library (main library), William H. Moses Jr. Architecture Library, the Music Library, and the Nursing Library.

The Emancipation Oak was cited by the National Geographic Society as one of the 10 great trees in the world.

The waterfront campus is settled near the mouth of the Chesapeake Bay.

=== National Historic Landmark District ===
- Hampton Institute
- U.S. National Register of Historic Places
- U.S. National Historic Landmark District
- Virginia Landmarks Register
- Location within Virginia Location within the United States
- Location: NW of jct. of U.S. 60 and the Hampton Roads Bridge Tunnel, Hampton, Virginia
- Coordinates: 37°01′13″N 76°35′40″W
- Area: 314 acres (127 ha)
- Built: 1866
- Architect: Richard Morris Hunt; Et al.
- NRHP reference No.: 69000323
- VLR No.: 114-0006

Significant dates
- Added to NRHP: November 12, 1969
- Designated NHLD: May 30, 1974
- Designated VLR: September 9, 1969

A 15-acre (61,000 m^{2}) portion of the campus along the Hampton River, including many of the older buildings, is a U.S. National Historic Landmark District. Buildings included are:

- Mansion House, original plantation residence of Little Scotland
- Virginia Hall, built in 1873
- Academic Hall
- Wigwam
- Marquand Memorial Chapel, a Romanesque Revival red brick chapel with a 150-foot (46 m) tower

In addition, Cleveland Hall, Ogden, and the Administration building are also included in the district.

The district was listed on the National Register of Historic Places in 1969 and declared a National Historic Landmark in 1974.

=== Student demographics ===
In 2023, nearly two-thirds of Hampton students were women and the other third men. Approximately 97% of them identified as Black and 20% were Virginia residents. 68% of students received need-based financial aid. The average need-based scholarship or grant awardeded to first-year students at Hampton was $10,025.

== Academics ==
Hampton University has the following schools and colleges.

- School of Engineering and Technology
- School of Pharmacy
- James T. George School of Business
- Scripps Howard School of Journalism and Communication
- School of Nursing
- School of Liberal Arts and Education
- School of Religion
- School of Science
- University College
- College of Virginia Beach
- Graduate College

As of 2020, Hampton offers 50 baccalaureate programs, 26 master's programs, seven doctoral programs, two professional programs, and ten associate/certificate programs.

The Freddye T. Davy Honors College is a non-degree granting college that offers special learning opportunities and privileges to the most high-achieving undergraduates. To join the honors college, students must formally accept an invitation given by the college or directly apply for admissions into the college.

Hampton University consistently ranks among the top ten HBCUs in the nation and is ranked in Tier 1 (#217) among "National Universities" by U.S. News & World Report.

Hampton's student to faculty ratio is 10 to 1, which is better than the national university average of 18 to 1.

Hampton is the first and only HBCU to have 100% control of a NASA Mission.

The Alumni Factor named Hampton one of the seven best colleges in Virginia.

Hampton University is classified as a selective admissions institution.

== Student activities ==
=== Athletics ===
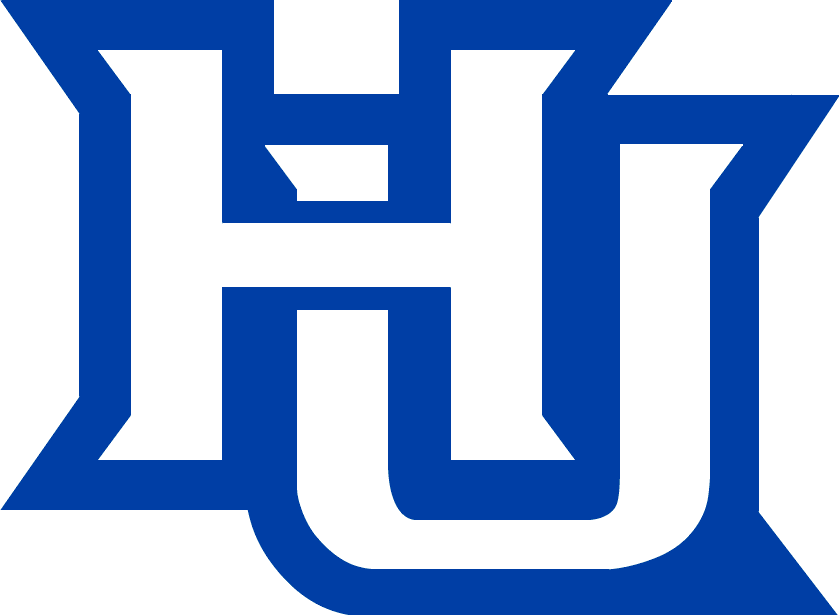
Hampton University athletics logo

Hampton sports teams participate in NCAA Division I (FCS for football) in the Coastal Athletic Association (CAA). They joined in 2022 upon leaving the Mid-Eastern Athletic Conference and then later the Big South Conference. Hampton is one of three NCAA Division I HBCU institutions (along with Tennessee State University, in the Ohio Valley Conference and CAA rival North Carolina A&T) to not be a member of the Mid-Eastern Athletic Conference or Southwestern Athletic Conference.

In 2016, Hampton became the first and only HBCU to field a Division I men's lacrosse team. ESPN held a broadcast on campus preceding the inaugural game in Armstrong Stadium.

Hampton is the only HBCU with a competitive sailing team.

In 2001, the Hampton basketball team won its first NCAA tournament game, when they beat Iowa State 58–57, in one of the largest upsets of all time. They were only the fourth fifteen-seed to upset a two-seed in the tournament's history. They returned to the tournament a year later, as well as in 2006, 2011, 2015 and 2016, having won their conference basketball tournament. Their NCAA tournament record is 2–6, including the play-in game.

The "Lady Pirates" basketball team has made trips to the NCAA tournament in 2000, 2003, 2004, 2010–2014, and 2017. In 1988, as a Division II school, the Lady Pirates won the NCAA Women's Division II Basketball Championship, defeating West Texas State. In 2011, as a number-13 seed, the Lady Pirates nearly upset Kentucky, but fell in overtime, 66–62. In 2015, the Lady Pirates played in the Women's NIT, where they defeated Drexel 45–42 in the opening round. However, in the second round, the team lost to West Virginia 57–39.

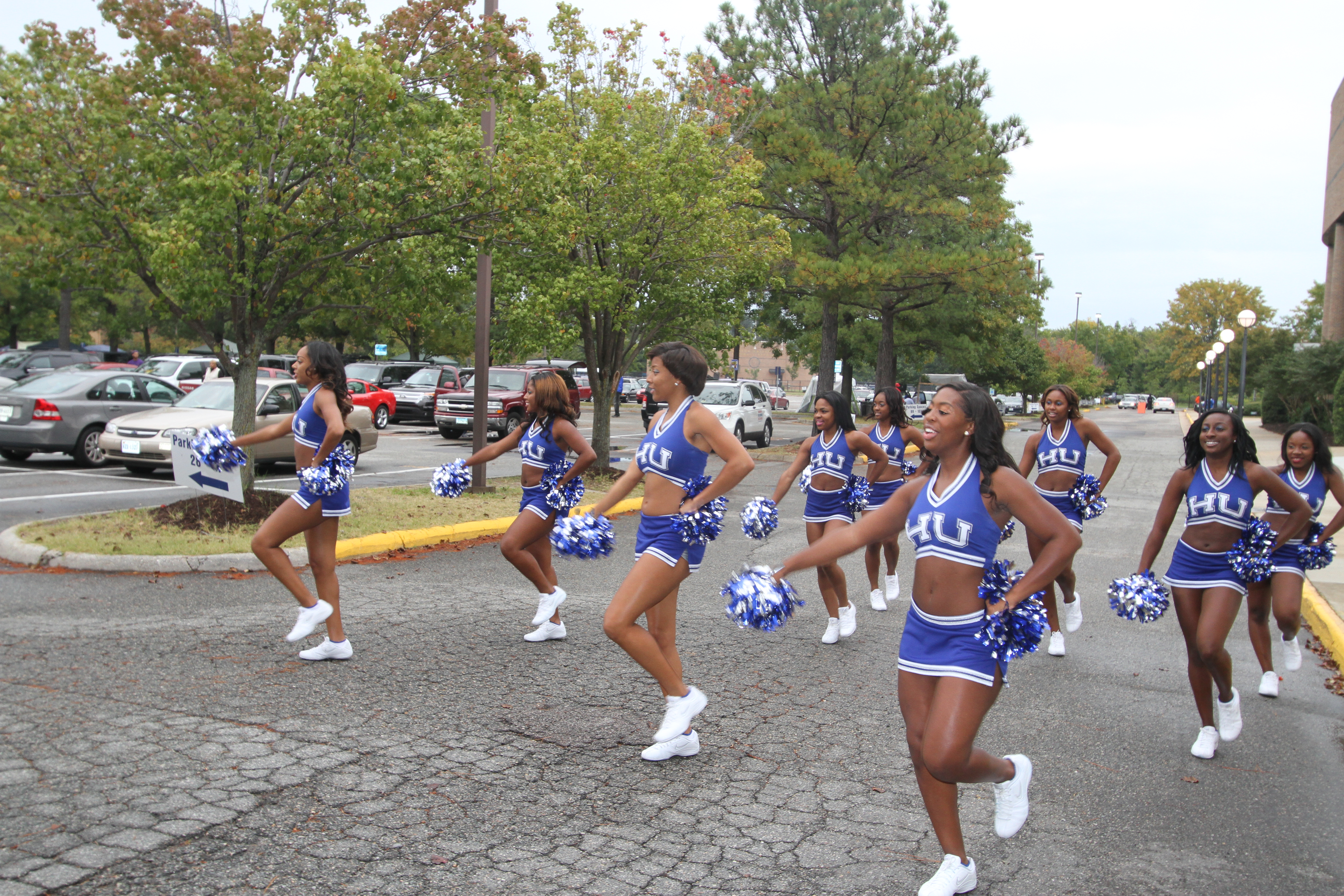
HU's "Blue Thunder" cheerleaders heading towards the annual Military Appreciation Day football game

The Pirates won their conference title in football in 1997, shared the title 1998 and 2004, and won it again outright in 2005 and 2006. From 2004 to 2006, the team won three MEAC Championships and three SBN-Black College National Championships, and was ranked in the Division I FCS top 25 poll each year. The Pirates also sent five players to the NFL Combine in 2007, the most out of any FCS subdivision school for that year. They have also been dominant in tennis, winning the MEAC from 1996 to 1999, 2001–2003 and 2007 for the men, and 1998 and 2002–2004 for the women.

Major rivals include Norfolk State University, located across Hampton Roads in downtown Norfolk, and Howard University in Washington, D.C.

In 2019, Hampton revived their rivalry with Virginia Union University from Richmond, Virginia.

=== Student organizations ===
There are over 55 student organizations on campus in arts, athletics, community service, leadership, religion, and student government.

==== "The Marching Force" marching band ====
Pirate athletics are supported by a plethora of groups, including "The Marching Force" Marching Band. The marching band has appeared at several notable events, including a Barack Obama Presidential Inauguration parade in Washington, D.C. "The Force" was chosen out of a large pool of applicants to participate in the parade as the representative for the state of Virginia. "The Force" is complemented by the "Ebony Fire" all-women danceline, as well as "Silky", the flag team, and as of 2018, "Shimmering Sapphire Elegance", the majorette team.

==== Greek life ====
Hampton University has over 15 Greek letter organizations, including the National Pan-Hellenic Council organizations.

== Notable alumni ==
=== Business ===
Name	Class year	Notability	Reference(s)
Robert S. Abbott	1896	Founder of The Chicago Defender and of the annual Bud Billiken Day Parade in Chicago	
Robert Brokenburr	1906	Attorney; counsel and general manager for the Madame C.J. Walker Manufacturing Company	
Sashi Brown	1998	President of the Baltimore Ravens	
Percy Creuzot	1949	Founder of Creole restaurant chain Frenchy's Chicken in Houston, Texas	
Rashida Jones	2002	President of MSNBC; former Vice President of NBC News and MSNBC	
Keith Leaphart	1996	Entrepreneur, philanthropist and physician	
Charles Phillips	1986	Former chairman and CEO of Infor; former President of Oracle Corporation	
John H. Sengstacke	1934	owner and publisher of the largest chain of Black newspapers in the U.S.; founder of the National Newspaper Publishers Association; Presidential Citizens Medal	
Percy Sutton		Co-founder of Inner City Broadcasting Corporation; investor in the New York Amsterdam News and the Apollo Theater; producer of It's Showtime at the Apollo	

=== Education ===
Name	Class year	Notability	Reference(s)
Thomas Fountain Blue	1888	Early trainer of Black librarians; first Black American to head a public library; Hampton's Library School was a continuation of his training program	
St. Clair Drake	1931	Sociologist and anthropologist; created the first African and African American studies program at Stanford University	
Luther H. Foster Jr.	1934	Fourth president of Tuskegee University and president of the United Negro College Fund	
Martha Louise Morrow Foxx		Blind educator; principal of the Mississippi School for the Blind	
Charles W. Green	1875	Headed Tuskegee University's Agriculture Department; developed the Greenwood Business District in Tuskegee, which served as a model for the Greenwood District in Tulsa, Oklahoma	
Freeman A. Hrabowski III	1969	President of the University of Maryland, Baltimore County; American Academy of Arts and Sciences; Heinz Award	
Constance Hill Marteena	1933	Librarian and president of the North Carolina Negro Library Association	
Robert Russa Moton	1890	President Emeritus of Tuskegee University; namesake of the Tuskegee Airmen training site Moton Field; advisor to five U.S. presidents; Spingarn Medal; Harmon Award	
Hugh R. Page	1977	Professor of theology and Africana Studies at the University of Notre Dame	
Evelyn Pope		Dean of Library Sciences at North Carolina Central University	
James Solomon Russell		Founder, president and chaplain of Saint Paul's College (Virginia); Harmon Award	
Janice Underwood	1998, 2002	Educator and businesswoman	
Booker T. Washington	1875	Educator, author, including his autobiography Up from Slavery, orator, first president of Tuskegee Institute (now Tuskegee University), founder of the National Business League, prominent civil rights and racial “uplift” advocate, and adviser to several presidents of the United States. Between 1890 and 1915, Washington was the dominant leader in the African American community.	
Charles H. Williams	1909	Co-founder of the CIAA; founder of Hampton's Terpsichorean Dance Company; chaired Hampton's Physical Education Department	
William T. B. Williams	1888	Field agent for the Jeanes Fund and Slater Fund and U.S. government consultant; reports helped establish hundreds of training schools; Spingarn Medal	
Stephen J. Wright	1934	Seventh president of Fisk University and president of the United Negro College Fund	

=== Entertainment, media, and the arts ===
Name	Class year	Notability	Reference(s)
John T. Biggers		Harlem Renaissance muralist and founder of the Art Department at Texas Southern University	
Leslie Garland Bolling	1918	Early 20th-century wood carver	
Spider Burks	1946	One of the first African-American disc jockeys in St. Louis	
Ruth E. Carter	1982	Has star on the Hollywood Walk of Fame; Academy Award in costume design for Black Panther	
Spencer Christian		Former weatherman for Good Morning America, 1986–1998	
Brian Custer	1993	Sports broadcaster; ESPN SportsCenter anchor and Showtime Championship Boxing host	
Gizelle Bryant	1992	Reality Star on, Real Housewives of Potomac	
DJ Babey Drew	2003	Grammy Award-winning record producer and disc jockey	
DJ Envy	1999	Radio Hall of Fame; disc jockey and host of The Breakfast Club	
Beverly Gooden	2005	Writer and activist	
Biff Henderson		Stage manager and personality on the Late Show with David Letterman	
Weldon Irvine	1965	Composer, playwright, poet, pianist, organist, and keyboardist; wrote over 500 songs, including "To Be Young, Gifted and Black"	
J.I.D		Rapper, signed to Dreamville Records in 2017	
DJ Tay James	2009	A&R and disc jockey for Justin Bieber	
Rashida Jones	2002	First African-American to lead a major cable news network (MSNBC)	
Javicia Leslie	2009	Actress; Batwoman, God Friended Me, Always a Bridesmaid, The Family Business; first Black actor to wear the Batsuit	
Samella Lewis	1945	Painter and art historian; founder of the International Review of African American Art; first Black American female to earn a Ph.D. in fine art and art history	
Dorothy Maynor	1933	Concert singer; first Black American to sing at a U.S. presidential inauguration; founder of The Harlem School of the Arts; first Black Metropolitan Opera board member	
Orpheus McAdoo	1876	Minstrel show impresario; toured Britain, South Africa and Australia	
Che Pope	1992	Grammy Award-winning record producer; co-founder and CEO of WRKSHP	
Robi Reed	1982	Casting director; first Black American to win an Emmy Award for casting; The Tuskegee Airmen, Harlem Nights, In Living Color	
MC Ride		Musician; best known for being the lead vocalist of Death Grips	
Clarissa Sligh	1961	Photographer, book artist; lead plaintiff in the Virginia school desegregation case Thompson v County School Board of Arlington County	
Brandon Mychal Smith		Actor	
Nikkolas Smith		Author, illustrator, film artist; painted the King Chad mural in Disneyland	
Wanda Sykes	1986	Emmy Award-winning actress, comedian and writer	
Johnny Venus	2012	Rapper, member of EARTHGANG and co-founder of Spillage Village	
Roslyn Walker	1966	Curator of African Art, Dallas Museum of Art; former director of the National Museum of African Art	
Shiona Turini		Emmy Award-winning stylist and costume designer	
Emil Wilbekin	1989	Black & gay rights activist; founder of Native Son Now; former Afropunk Festival chief content officer and editor-in-chief of Vibe and Giant magazines	
A. S. (Doc) Young	1941	First Black publicist in Hollywood; executive editor of the Los Angeles Sentinel; sports editor for Jet and Ebony magazines	

=== Politics and government ===
Name	Class year	Notability	Reference(s)
Orison Rudolph Aggrey	1946	Former U.S. Ambassador to The Gambia, Senegal and Romania	
Ebenezer Ako-Adjei	1942	One of the Big Six leaders in the Gold Coast's struggle for independence from Britain; served as Ghana's first Minister for Trade and Labor, first Minister for Justice and first Minister for Foreign Affairs	
Ambrose Mandvulo Dlamini	1996	Prime minister of Eswatini; CEO of Nedbank Eswatini and CEO of MTN Eswatini	
Allyson Kay Duncan	1972	4th Circuit US Circuit Court Judge	
George Washington Fields	1878	First Black graduate of Cornell Law School	
Frankie Muse Freeman	1936	Civil rights attorney; first woman appointed to the U.S. Commission on Civil Rights; Spingarn Medal	
Vanessa D. Gilmore	1977	Federal Judge of the United States District Court for the Southern District of Texas	
Theodore Theopolis Jones II	1965	Associate Judge of the Court of Appeals, New York	
Tishaura Jones	1994	First Black female mayor of St. Louis	
Nupol Kiazolu		Civil rights and homelessness activist	
Mbiyu Koinange	1931	Kenya Minister of State, Minister for Foreign Affairs and Minister of Education; cabinet of Kenya's first president Jomo Kenyatta	
Gloria Gary Lawlah	1960	Secretary of Aging for the State of Maryland	
Patrick A. Lewis	1966	Antigua and Barbuda Ambassador to the United Nations and to the United States	
Spencer Overton	1990	President of the Joint Center for Political and Economic Studies; election scholar, George Washington University Law School	
Douglas Palmer	1973	Mayor of Trenton, New Jersey	
Henry E. Parker	1965	Connecticut State Treasurer (1975–1986)	
Robin R. Sanders	1977	Former U.S. Ambassador to the Republic of the Congo and Nigeria	
Gregory M. Sleet		US District Court Judge for the United States District Court for the District of Delaware	
Sylvia Trent-Adams	1987	First African-American nurse to serve as Surgeon General of the United States	
Charles Wesley Turnbull	1958	Former governor of the U.S. Virgin Islands	
W. Carlton Weddington		Member of Ohio House of Representatives	

=== Science, health care, technology, engineering and mathematics ===
Name	Class year	Notability	Reference(s)
William Warrick Cardozo	1923	Early sickle cell anemia researcher	
William Claytor	1900	Pioneering African-American mathematician; chaired the Mathematics Department at Howard University	
Moogega Cooper	2006	Engineer; Lead of Planetary Protection for the Mars 2020 Mission at NASA's Jet Propulsion Laboratory	
Christine Darden	1962	NASA mathematician and aeronautical engineer; supersonic flight and sonic boom researcher featured in the book Hidden Figures; Congressional Gold Medal	
Mary Jackson	1942	NASA human computer and its first Black female engineer; namesake of the Mary W. Jackson NASA Headquarters in Washington; Congressional Gold Medal	
Ayana Jordan	2001	Addiction psychiatrist, physician, and immunopathologist; professor at Yale School of Medicine, Yale University, and NYU Langone Health; elected to the Board of Trustees of the American Psychiatric Association	
Flemmie Pansy Kittrell	1928	Pioneer in nutrition and child development; first woman of color to earn a Ph.D. in nutrition; instrumental in creating the Head Start program; namesake of Hampton's Flemmie Kittrell Hall	
Tiara Moore	2013	Environmental ecologist and founder of Black in Marine Science	
Susan La Flesche Picotte	1886	First Native American physician	
Devin G. Walker	1998	Dark matter researcher; theoretical particle physicist at Dartmouth College; first Black American to earn a Ph.D. in physics from Harvard University	
James West	Did not graduate	Inventor, primarily of microphones	

=== Sociology and humanities ===
Name	Class year	Notability	Reference(s)
Clara Byrd Baker		Educator, civic leader, and suffragette	
Septima Poinsette Clark	1946	"Queen mother" of the Civil Rights Movement; developed citizenship classes that enabled Black Southerners to register and vote; SCLC board; American Book Award	
Christy S. Coleman	1992	Historian; executive director of the Jamestown-Yorktown Foundation; former president and chief executive officer of the American Civil War Museum and Charles H. Wright Museum of African American History	
Augustus M. Hodges	1874	Newspaper editor, journalist, poet, novelist, and political organizer	
Alberta Williams King	1924	Mother of Martin Luther King Jr.	
Elisabeth Omilami		Chief Executive Officer of Hosea Feed the Hungry and Homeless	
William Henry Sheppard	1883	Missionary, ethnographer and explorer; first Westerner to enter the Kingdom of Kuba; reported on the Belgian atrocities in the Congo; pioneering African art collector; Fellow of the Royal Geographical Society in England	
Mychal Denzel Smith	2008	Writer at The Nation, television commentator and author; Kirkus Prize	
Thomas Calhoun Walker	1883	Attorney and land ownership advocate; purchased land and sold it back to local farmers; Gloucester County, Virginia led the nation in per capita Black farm ownership in 1930	
Will West Long	1904	Cherokee mask maker, translator, and cultural historian	

=== Sports ===
Name	Class year	Notability	Reference(s)
Chris Baker	2008	Former NFL defensive tackle	
Darian Barnes		Former NFL running back	
Johnnie Barnes		Former NFL wide receiver	
Jamal Brooks	1999	Former NFL linebacker	
James Carter		Award-winning track athlete	
Mo'ne Davis	2023	Participant in the 2014 Little League World Series and 2014 AP Women's Athlete of the Year; began playing for Hampton softball in the 2020 season	
Marcus Dixon		Current CFL defensive tackle; also played in the NFL for the Dallas Cowboys and the New York Jets	
Reggie Doss		Former NFL defensive end	
Justin Durant	2007	Former NFL linebacker	
Kenrick Ellis		Current NFL defensive tackle, New York Jets	
Devin Green	2005	Former NBA player	
Isaac Hilton		Former NFL defensive end	
Rick Mahorn	1980	Former NBA player, Washington Bullets, Detroit Pistons, New Jersey Nets; WNBA Detroit Shock Head Coach	
Jerome Mathis		Former NFL wide receiver	
Nevin McCaskill		Former NFL offensive lineman	
Francena McCorory	2010	Track and field, two-time Olympic gold medalist, NCAA 400m three-time champion	
Marquay McDaniel	2007	CFL football player, Hamilton Tiger-Cats	
Chidi Okezie	2015	Track and field Olympian representing Nigeria at the 2020 Olympics	
Dick Price	1957	Former head football coach at Norfolk State University, 1974–1983; former head coach of track team and athletic director at Norfolk State	
Zuriel Smith	2002	Former NFL wide receiver and return specialist	
Pierre Sow		Professional basketball player	
Cordell Taylor		Former NFL defensive back	
Terrence Warren		Former NFL wide receiver	
Kellie Wells		Track and field Olympic athlete; 100m hurdle bronze medalist, 2012	

== See also ==
- Civil rights movement (1865–1896)
- Emancipation Oak, historic tree on the campus
- WHOV 88.1 FM
