= Raymond V. Haysbert =

Tuskegee Airman and American businessman (1920–2010)

Raymond V. Haysbert Sr.
- Born: January 19, 1920; Cincinnati, Ohio
- Died: May 24, 2010 (aged 90); Baltimore, Maryland
- Education: Wilberforce University
- Occupations: Chief Executive Officer, Parks Sausage Company
- Known for: Tuskegee Airmen (U.S. Army Air Force)
- Board member of: Greater Baltimore Urban League (Chairman)
- Spouse: Carol
- Children: 4
- Awards: National Minority Entrepreneur of the Year, 1991; Raymond V. Haysbert Research Center, Coppin State University, 2004

Raymond V. Haysbert Sr. (January 19, 1920 – May 24, 2010) was an American business executive and civil rights leader during the second half of the 20th century in Baltimore, Maryland. During World War II, he served in Africa and Italy with the renowned Tuskegee Airmen. Haysbert joined Baltimore-based Parks Sausage Company in 1952, becoming CEO as it grew into one of the largest black-owned U.S. businesses. In later years, he was active in politics and the American civil rights movement. Haysbert was chairman of the Greater Baltimore Urban League when he died at age 90 in 2010.

== Early life ==
Haysbert was born in Cincinnati, Ohio, in 1920 into a poor family. After working for a coal company, he earned a degree in accounting at Wilberforce University. Following the outbreak of World War II, Haysbert joined the acclaimed Tuskegee Airmen, the first all-black fighter squadron, in Italy and Africa. After the war, he taught at Wilberforce University.

== Business leader ==
In 1952, Haysbert moved from Wilberforce to Baltimore when he was recruited by Henry G. Parks Jr., founder of the sausage company there bearing his name, to serve as accountant and office manager. Haysbert was subsequently promoted to general manager, then executive vice president, before being named president and CEO of Parks Sausage Company. As CEO, he oversaw Parks' growth into one of the largest black-owned businesses in the U.S., becoming so successful that it was the first minority-owned company to have its shares traded on a stock exchange, in 1969. Under Haysbert, Parks Sausage became the supplier for such restaurant chains as Domino's Pizza and Pizza Hut. In 1991, he was named National Minority Entrepreneur of the Year, as Parks Sausage grew into a $26 million company employing 240 workers.

== Civic activities ==
During the time of civil rights activism beginning in the early 1960s, Haysbert worked to elect black politicians, including Harry Cole as Maryland's first African-American state senator. In 1983, he started the President’s Roundtable for black business leaders to meet together. Haysbert was chairman of the board of directors of the Greater Baltimore Urban League, the local affiliate of the National Urban League, until his death in 2010, helping to restore the venerable civil rights group's financial viability.

Of his many organizational memberships, Haysbert was also a member of Alpha Phi Alpha fraternity, having been initiated at Wilberforce University (Xi chapter) on April 13, 1950 and was a member of Baltimore's Delta Lambda chapter until his death.

He told a newspaper interviewer in 1992 that, although he "started in the ghetto, black, poor, on welfare ... in America, it's still possible for him to succeed, without a government subsidy." He also was a leader in the field of education, helping to develop the Leadership Development Program for Minority Managers at Johns Hopkins University in the 1990s. The program provides an academic business environment for mid-level black professionals, bringing together the university's resources and Baltimore's business community. The Raymond V. Haysbert Research Center at Coppin State University, an applied research facility, was instituted and named in his honor in 2004.

== Death ==
When Haysbert died of heart failure in Baltimore on May 24, 2010, he was called an "elder statesman of Maryland's African-American business community" by the Baltimore Sun and lauded as a "courageous American hero" by the president of the Baltimore City Council. Mayor Stephanie Rawlings-Blake said Haysbert, "used his success and status in the community to help dozens if not hundreds of other minority-owned businesses start and thrive in Baltimore". He was survived by his wife, Carol, and four children.
