= National Register of Historic Places listings in Hampton, Virginia =

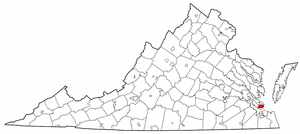
Location of Hampton in Virginia

This is a list of the National Register of Historic Places listings in Hampton, Virginia.

This is intended to be a complete list of the properties and districts on the National Register of Historic Places in the independent city of Hampton, Virginia, United States. The locations of National Register properties and districts for which the latitude and longitude coordinates are included below, may be seen in an online map.

There are 30 properties and districts listed on the National Register in the city, including 5 National Historic Landmarks. Another 2 properties were once listed but have been removed.

This National Park Service list is complete through NPS recent listings posted August 8, 2025.

== Current listings ==
| | Name on the Register | Image | Date listed | Location | Description |
|---|---|---|---|---|---|
| 1 | Aberdeen Gardens | Aberdeen Gardens | May 26, 1994 (#94000456) | Roughly bounded by Langston and Mary Peake Boulevards and Russell, Davis, Lewis, Weaver, and Walker Rds. 37°02′00″N 76°24′21″W | |
| 2 | Buckroe Beach Carousel | Buckroe Beach Carousel | October 27, 1992 (#92001396) | 602 Settlers Landing Rd. 37°01′26″N 76°20′36″W | |
| 3 | Chamberlin Hotel | Chamberlin Hotel | March 21, 2007 (#07000190) | 2 Fenwick Rd., Fort Monroe; 37°00′04″N 76°18′44″W | |
| 4 | Chapel of the Centurion | Chapel of the Centurion | March 28, 2011 (#10000582) | 134 Bernard Rd., Fort Monroe; 37°00′10″N 76°18′28″W | Oldest continually used wooden military structure for religious services in the United States; built in 1858 |
| 5 | Chesterville Plantation Site | Chesterville Plantation Site | August 14, 1973 (#73002211) | East of State Route 172; 37°06′12″N 76°23′18″W | On the grounds of NASA Langley Research Center; boundary decrease approved October 26, 2022. |
| 6 | Reuben Clark House | Reuben Clark House | August 16, 1984 (#84003542) | 125 S. Willard Ave. 37°00′52″N 76°19′11″W | |
| 7 | Fort Monroe | Fort Monroe | October 15, 1966 (#66000912) | Old Point Comfort; 37°00′18″N 76°18′27″W | |
| 8 | Fort Wool | Fort Wool | November 25, 1969 (#69000339) | Island between Willoughby Spit and Old Point Comfort; 36°59′12″N 76°18′04″W | |
| 9 | Hampton City Hall | Hampton City Hall | August 8, 2007 (#07000806) | 100 Kings Way; 37°01′35″N 76°20′39″W | |
| 10 | Hampton Downtown Historic District | Hampton Downtown Historic District | December 27, 2010 (#10001062) | Roughly bounded by Franklin St., Lincoln St., Settlers Landing Rd., and Eaton St. 37°01′34″N 76°20′40″W | |
| 11 | Hampton Institute | Hampton Institute | November 12, 1969 (#69000323) | Northwest of the junction of U.S. Route 60 and the Hampton Roads Bridge-Tunnel; 37°01′14″N 76°20′25″W | |
| 12 | Hampton National Cemetery | Hampton National Cemetery | February 26, 1996 (#96000038) | Junction of Cemetery Rd. and Marshall Ave. 37°01′11″N 76°20′06″W | |
| 13 | Hampton National Guard Armory | Hampton National Guard Armory | November 22, 2016 (#16000798) | 504 N. King St. 37°01′53″N 76°20′43″W | |
| 14 | Herbert House | Herbert House | February 23, 1972 (#72001504) | East end of Marina Rd. on Hampton Creek; 37°00′59″N 76°20′35″W | |
| 15 | Little England Chapel | Little England Chapel | July 8, 1982 (#82004564) | 4100 Kecoughtan Rd. 37°00′47″N 76°21′10″W | |
| 16 | Lunar Landing Research Facility | Lunar Landing Research Facility | October 3, 1985 (#85002808) | Langley Research Center; 37°06′06″N 76°23′23″W | |
| 17 | NASA Langley Research Center (LaRC) Historic District | NASA Langley Research Center (LaRC) Historic District | June 27, 2012 (#12000374) | Roughly bounded by Wythe Creek Rd., Commander Shepard Blvd., Brick Kiln Cr., & Langley Air Force Base; 37°05′01″N 76°20′31″W | |
| 18 | Old Point Comfort Lighthouse | Old Point Comfort Lighthouse | March 1, 1973 (#73002212) | Fenwick Rd., southwest of the east gate of Fort Monroe; 37°00′07″N 76°18′23″W | |
| 19 | Old Wythe Historic District | Old Wythe Historic District | October 31, 2012 (#12000905) | Roughly bounded by Hanover St., Pear Ave., Hampton Ave., and Kecoughtan Rd. 36°59′42″N 76°23′24″W | |
| 20 | Pasture Point Historic District | Pasture Point Historic District | October 22, 2012 (#08000940) | Bounded by the Hampton River on the east, Bright's Creek on the north, Wine St. on the west, and Syms St. on the south 37°01′52″N 76°20′29″W | |
| 21 | Phoebus Historic District | Phoebus Historic District | December 1, 2006 (#06001098) | Roughly bounded by Interstate 64, Mallory St., E. County St., and Willard Ave. 37°00′59″N 76°19′23″W | |
| 22 | Quarters 1 | Quarters 1 | March 28, 2011 (#10000583) | 151 Bernard Rd., Fort Monroe; 37°00′14″N 76°18′20″W | Headquarters of Fort Monroe from 1819 to 1907; quarters used by Abraham Lincoln while planning the attack on Norfolk during the American Civil War |
| 23 | Quarters 17 | Quarters 17 | March 28, 2011 (#10000584) | 41A, 41B, 47A, 47B Bernard Rd., Fort Monroe; 37°00′09″N 76°18′32″W | Quarters of Robert E. Lee during the construction of Fort Monroe, 1831–1834; |
| 24 | Rendezvous Docking Simulator | Rendezvous Docking Simulator | October 3, 1985 (#85002809) | Langley Research Center; 37°05′08″N 76°22′38″W | |
| 25 | St. John's Church | St. John's Church | February 26, 1970 (#70000871) | Northwest corner of W. Queen and Court Sts. 37°01′34″N 76°20′48″W | The oldest English-speaking church in the US, est. 1610. |
| 26 | Scott House | Scott House | August 5, 1999 (#99000967) | 232 S. Armistead Ave. 37°01′22″N 76°21′01″W | |
| 27 | Thimble Shoal Light Station | Thimble Shoal Light Station | December 2, 2002 (#02001436) | Approximately 1.5 miles (2.4 km) east of Fort Monroe Military Reservation; 37°01′02″N 76°14′24″W | |
| 28 | William H. Trusty House | William H. Trusty House | June 22, 1979 (#79003280) | 76 W. County St. 37°01′19″N 76°19′28″W | |
| 29 | Variable Density Tunnel | Variable Density Tunnel | October 3, 1985 (#85002795) | Langley Research Center; 37°04′43″N 76°20′39″W | |
| 30 | Victoria Boulevard Historic District | Victoria Boulevard Historic District | October 4, 1984 (#84000039) | Roughly bounded by Sunset Creek, Armisted and Linden Aves., and Bridge St. 37°01′09″N 76°20′53″W | |

== Former listings ==
| | Name on the Register | Image | Date listed | Date removed | Location | City or town | Description |
|---|---|---|---|---|---|---|---|
| 1 | Eight-Foot High Speed Tunnel | Eight-Foot High Speed Tunnel | October 3, 1985 (#85002798) | August 25, 2014 | Langley Research Center; 37°04′56″N 76°20′29″W | Hampton | |
| 2 | Full Scale Tunnel | Full Scale Tunnel | October 3, 1985 (#85002796) | August 25, 2014 | Langley Research Center; 37°04′58″N 76°20′30″W | Hampton | |

== See also ==
- List of National Historic Landmarks in Virginia
- National Register of Historic Places listings in Virginia
