= General Ferguson =

General Ferguson or Fergusson may refer to:

- Sir Charles Fergusson, 7th Baronet (1865–1951), British Army general
- Frank Kerby Fergusson (1874–1937), U.S. Air Force brigadier general
- Harley Bascom Ferguson (1875–1968), U.S. Army major general
- James Ferguson (general) (1913–2000), U.S. Air Force general
- James Fergusson (British Army officer) (1787–1865), British Army general
- Samuel W. Ferguson (1834–1917), Confederate States Army brigadier general
