= St. Patrick's Day Snowstorm =

1892 weather event in the United States

The St. Patrick's Day Snowstorm was a powerful winter storm that hit the Southeastern United States in mid-March 1892, with the heaviest snowfalls occurring in Nashville, Tennessee, and the Mid-State region. The event was atypical for this humid subtropical climate. Some portions of Middle Tennessee received record accumulation of up to 26 inches (66 cm) of snow.

== Average climate ==
The average high temperature in Nashville during the month of March is 61 °F (16 °C). The average snowfall is only 0.32 inches (0.81 cm) in the latter half of the month. On St. Patrick's Day, the average temperature in Nashville is 61.3 °F (16.3 °C) with negligible average snowfall.

== Winter of 1891–92 ==
The winter of 1891–92 featured very little snowfall in Tennessee, only 0.3 inches (0.76 cm) recorded in Nashville through March 14. The temperature reached into the 60s during several days that March, and even into the 70s on March 4. But a powerful cold front swept into Middle Tennessee in mid-March, dropping the temperature from 65 °F (18 °C) on March 13 to only 40 °F (4 °C) on March 14.

Much of the Southeastern United States plummeted into the teens from Arkansas to Alabama. On March 15, 1892, Nashville received 4.2 inches (11 cm) of snow, most of which melted by the following day.

== Storm details ==
On March 16 around 6:00 pm, snow began falling in Nashville with little accumulating by midnight. By the afternoon of March 17, St. Patrick's Day, the city had been inundated with 17 inches (43 cm) of snow. Northeast of Nashville, Riddleton, Tennessee, was besieged by 26 inches (66 cm) over the two-day period.

In Nashville, morning trains were delayed while streetcars were unable to function. A freight train traveling from Chattanooga to Nashville partially derailed when it collided with a train engine near Murfreesboro. Temperatures hovered between 28 °F (−2 °C) and 30 °F (−1 °C) that day.

== Outside of Middle Tennessee ==
Memphis received 18 inches (46 cm) of snow while Mount Carmel, Illinois, received 12 inches (30 cm). Even Atlanta, Georgia, received 0.3 inches (0.76 cm) of snow with accumulation measured as far south as Mobile, Alabama, and as far west as San Antonio, Texas. The surface storm moved along the Gulf Coast before dying out, only to regain power as it traveled up the Eastern Seaboard, dropping 33 inches (84 cm) of snow over the Mid-Atlantic and Northeastern United States.

== Records established ==
- Highest snowfall total in Nashville for a single day at 17 inches (43 cm)
- Highest snowfall total in Nashville for a 24-hour period at 17 inches (43 cm)
- Highest snowfall total in Memphis for a single day at 18 inches (46 cm)
- Highest snowfall total in Memphis for a 24-hour period at 18 inches (46 cm)
- Highest snowfall total in Middle Tennessee in one day at 18.7 inches (47 cm)
- Highest snowfall total in Nashville for a single month at 21.5 inches (55 cm)

The St. Patrick's Day Snowstorm also ranks as the second-deepest snow in Nashville history, only topped by the 22.8-inch (57.9-cm) snow that fell over a 48-hour period in February 1886. Only two other snowfalls in Nashville have ever exceeded 10 inches (25 cm); a 15-inch (38.1-cm) snow in February 1929 and a 10.2-inch (25.9-cm) snow that concluded on New Year's Day of 1964.
