= Hampton National Guard Armory =

- U.S. National Register of Historic Places
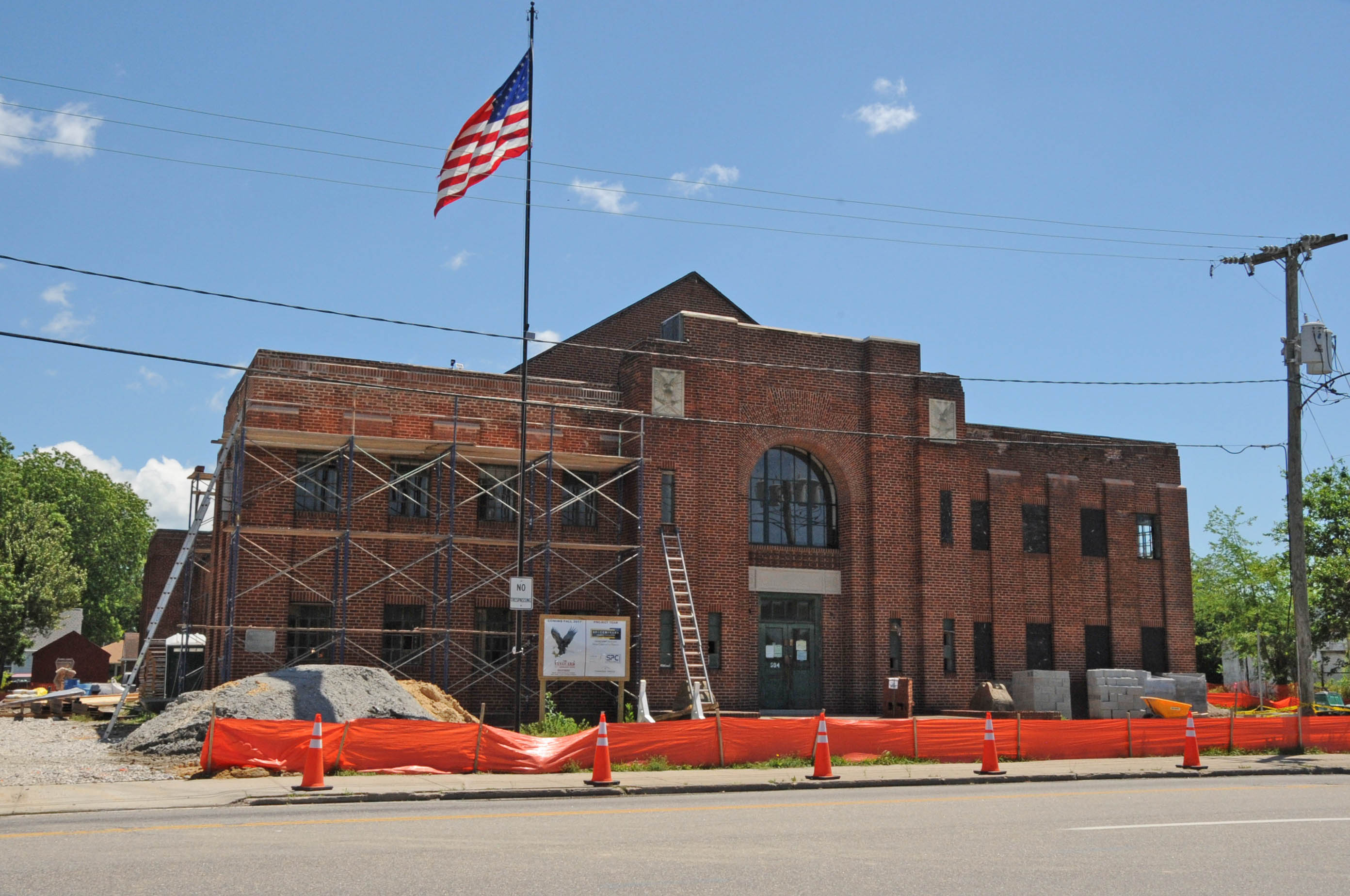

- Location within Virginia Location within the United States
- Location: 504 N. King St., Hampton, Virginia
- Coordinates: 37°1′53″N 76°20′43″W
- Area: 1.26 acres (0.51 ha)
- Built: 1936
- Architectural style: Moderne
- NRHP reference No.: 16000798
- Added to NRHP: November 22, 2016

The Hampton National Guard Armory is a history military facility at 504 North King Street in Hampton, Virginia. A large brick building with Moderne styling, it was built in 1936 with funding support from the New Deal-era Works Progress Administration, and is one of the few surviving armories built in the inter-war period in coastal Virginia. It originally housed Battery D of the 111th Field Artillery, and was used as a community meeting space for dances and other social events.

The building was listed on the National Register of Historic Places in 2016.

== See also ==
- National Register of Historic Places listings in Hampton, Virginia
