= Journal of the United States Artillery =

The Journal of the United States Artillery was founded at Fort Monroe in 1892 by First Lieutenant (later Major General) John Wilson Ruckman and four other officers of the Artillery School. Ruckman served as the editor of the Journal for four years (July 1892 to January 1896) and published several articles therein afterward. One publication by West Point notes Ruckman's "guidance" and "first-rate quality" work were obvious as the Journal "rose to high rank among the service papers of the world". The Journal was renamed the Coast Artillery Journal in 1922 and the Antiaircraft Journal in 1948.

== See also ==
- Field Artillery Branch (United States)
- U.S. Army Coast Artillery Corps
- Air Defense Artillery Branch (United States)
