= Frank Kerby Fergusson =

United States Army general

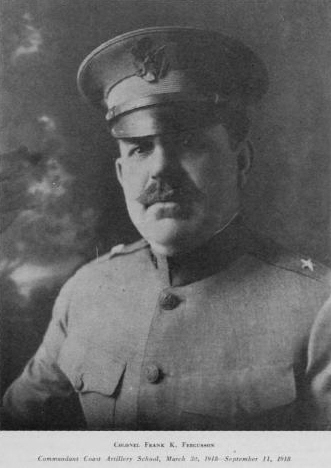
- Born: February 28, 1874; Riddleton, Tennessee
- Died: July 17, 1937 (aged 63); New York
- Military career
- Allegiance: United States
- Branch: United States Army
- Service years: 1896–1937
- Rank: Brigadier general
- Service number: 0-394
- Conflicts: World War I
- Awards: Distinguished Service Medal

Frank Kerby Fergusson (February 28, 1874 – June 17, 1937) was a United States Army officer in the late 19th and early 20th centuries. He served in World War I and received the Distinguished Service Medal.

== Biography ==
Fergusson was born on February 28, 1874, in Riddleton, Tennessee. He graduated 32nd in a class of 73 from the United States Military Academy in 1896 and was commissioned into the Third Artillery.

In his early military career, Fergusson was stationed at several locations, including Fort Monroe, Fort Canby, Battery K, First Artillery, Camp Wickoff, Fort Sam Houston, Galveston, Texas, Fort McIntosh, and Fort Brown. Fergusson commanded the latter fort between February and August 1901 as a first lieutenant. After his promotion to captain on August 1, 1901, until November 20, 1902, he commanded the 111th Company of the Coast Artillery at Fort Dade, Florida. After commanding the 73rd Company at Fort Monroe, he attended the School of Submarine Defense at Fort Totten between August 1905 and July 1906, when he graduated. He commanded an army mine planter, the Armistead, and from December 1908 to April 1909 he transported four mine planters from Fort Monroe to San Francisco, traveling around Cape Horn. In San Francisco, Fergusson served for sixteen months as a coast defense officer as well as an aide to Thomas Henry Barry.

Fergusson attended the United States Army War College between 1911 and 1912, and after graduating, he served as the adjutant general at a camp at Mount Gretna, Pennsylvania. After serving on the Ordnance Board from 1912 to 1914, Fergusson went to the Philippines, remaining there until December 1916. He traveled to France in August 1917 with the Eight Coast Artillery because of World War I. However, the United States Department of War ordered his return to Fort Monroe in February 1918 in order to command the Artillery Training Center, for which he won the Distinguished Service Medal. Fergusson was promoted to the rank of brigadier general on August 8, 1918, and he assumed command over the Coast Artillery School and several other military installations on the same day. After this, he served as the Coast Artillery district commander in San Francisco, and he went to Washington, D.C., to the General Staff College in August 1919.

After serving at Fort DuPont, Fergusson became Chief of Staff of the Third Corps Area in Baltimore, and he subsequently went to the Philippines from March 1922 to September 1924 and served as the Chief of Staff of the Philippine Division. After returning to the U.S., he assumed command over the 11th Coast Artillery as well as the Harbor Defenses of Long Island Sound. He then served at the Panama Canal Zone and later became the chief of staff of the Organized Reserve Second Corps Area. Lastly, he commanded the Harbor Defenses of Eastern New York, the 62nd Coast Artillery (AA), and the Eighth Corps District. He died on July 17, 1937.
