= Chapel of the Centurion =

- U.S. National Register of Historic Places
- U.S. National Historic Landmark District – Contributing property
- Virginia Landmarks Register
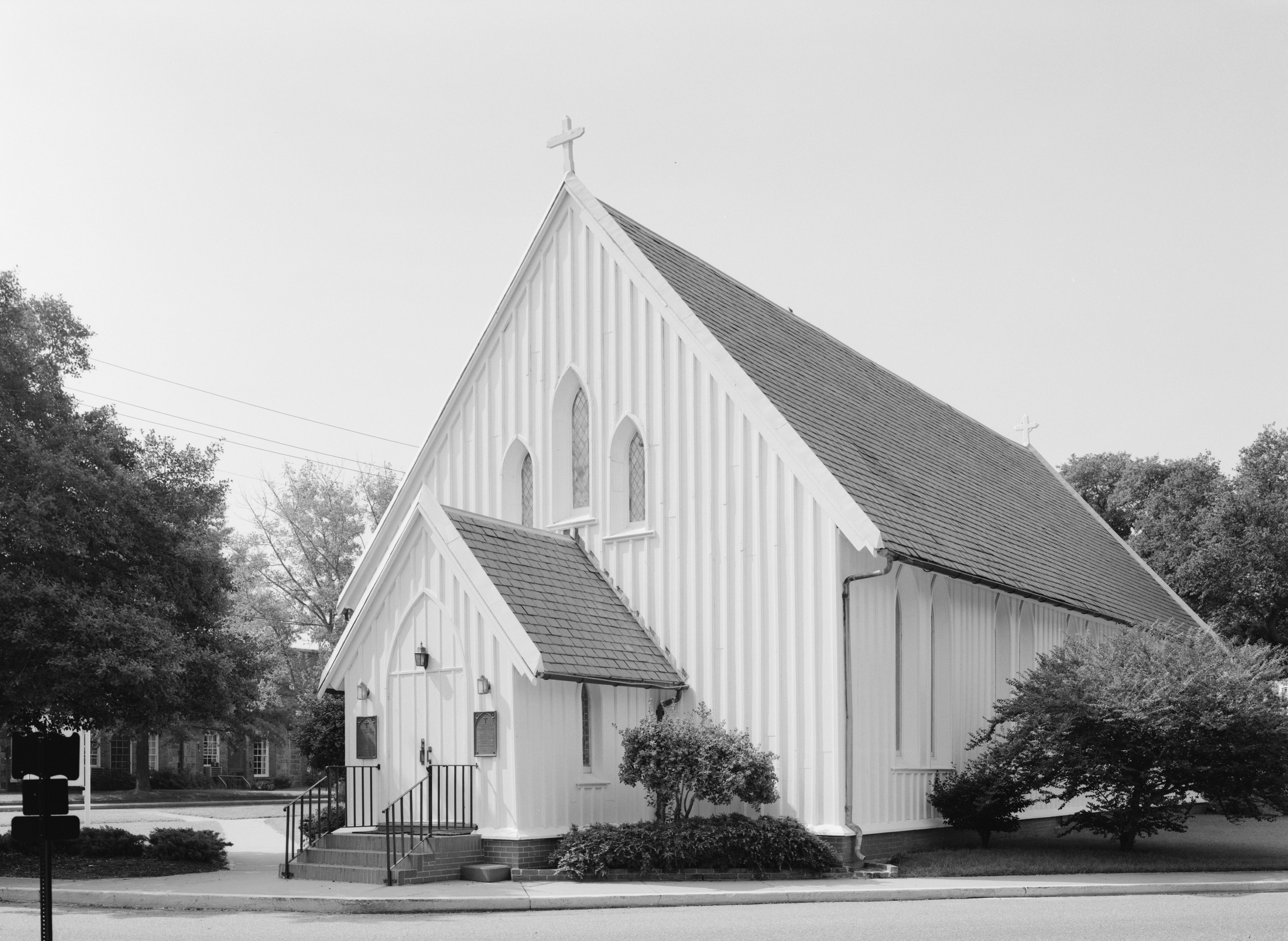
- Fort Monroe, Chapel of the Centurion, HABS Photo

- Location within Virginia Location within the United States
- Location: Fort Monroe, Hampton, Virginia
- Coordinates: 37°00′10″N 76°18′27″W
- Built: 1856
- Architect: Richard Upjohn
- Architectural style: Carpenter Gothic
- Part of: Fort Monroe (ID66000912)
- NRHP reference No.: 10000582
- VLR No.: 114-0002-0001

Significant dates
- Added to NRHP: October 15, 1966, March 28, 2011
- Designated VLR: June 17, 2010

The Chapel of the Centurion is the oldest continually used wooden military structure for religious services in the United States. It is located inside Fort Monroe, a former military installation located in Hampton, Virginia. The Chapel is named for Cornelius the Centurion, who is believed to be the first Gentile to convert to Christianity.

== History ==
Construction of the chapel began in 1856 and it was consecrated on May 3, 1858. It was designed by architect, Richard Upjohn, in the Carpenter Gothic style. Fort Monroe is no longer an active Army post.

It was individually listed on the National Register of Historic Places in 2011.

== Current ==
The Chapel had an active congregation, and on March 25, 2012, Lucious B. Morton was installed as the first civilian and first permanent pastor of the Centurion Interdenominational Church. Rev.Dr. Earl J. Eaddy was installed as pastor in July 2025.

== See also ==
- United States Army Chaplain Corps
