= Scott House (Hampton, Virginia) =

Historic house in Virginia, United States

- U.S. National Register of Historic Places
- Virginia Landmarks Register
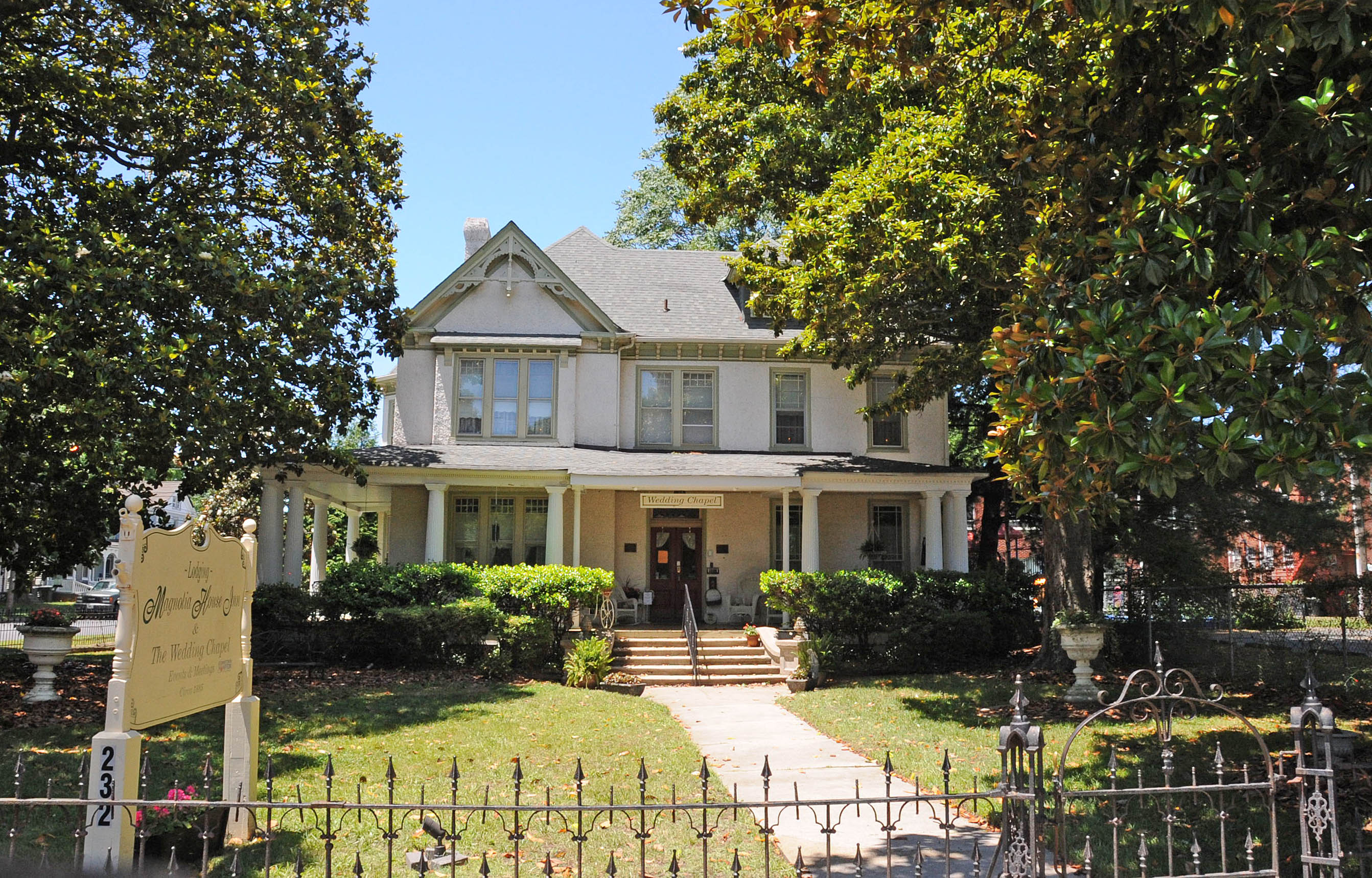

- Location within Virginia Location within the United States
- Location: 232 S. Armistead Ave., Hampton, Virginia
- Coordinates: 37°1′22″N 76°21′2″W
- Area: 0.8 acres (0.32 ha)
- Built: 1889
- Architectural style: Queen Anne
- NRHP reference No.: 99000967
- VLR No.: 114-0103

Significant dates
- Added to NRHP: August 5, 1999
- Designated VLR: June 16, 1999

Scott House, also known as The Magnolia House, is a historic home located at Hampton, Virginia. It was built in 1889, and is a two-story, five-bay, stuccoed wood-frame Queen Anne style dwelling. It has a steeply pitched cross-gable roof and features cornice dentils, a bracketed cornice, elaborate gable ornamentation, an art glass transom over the raised panel double door, and 14 fluted Doric order columns that support a wrap-around porch.

It was listed on the National Register of Historic Places in 1999.
