= William H. Trusty House =

Historic house in Virginia, United States

- U.S. National Register of Historic Places
- Virginia Landmarks Register
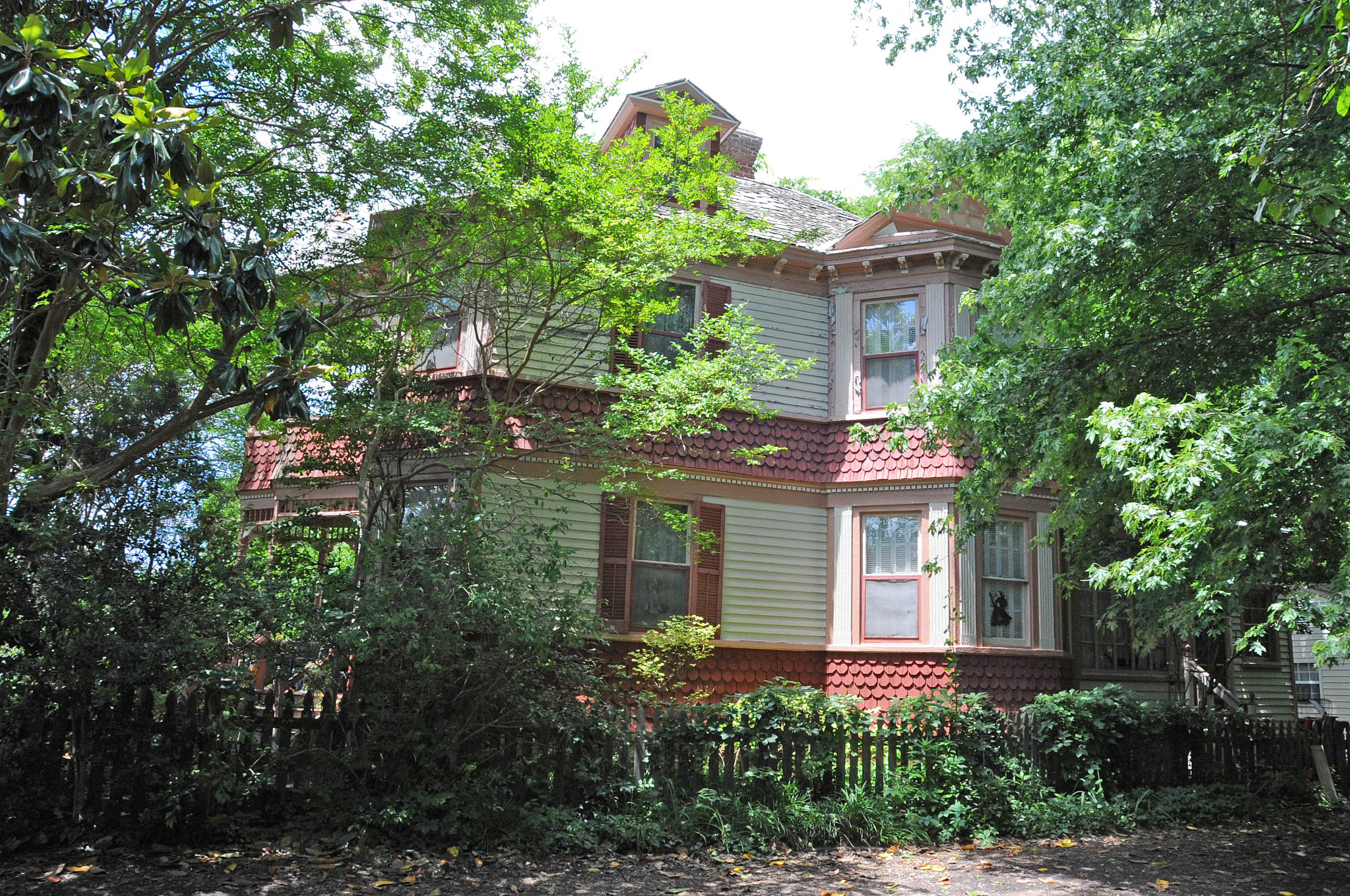

- Location within Virginia Location within the United States
- Location: 76 W. County St., Hampton, Virginia
- Coordinates: 37°1′18″N 76°19′29″W
- Area: 0.5 acres (0.20 ha)
- Built: 1897
- Architectural style: Stick/eastlake, Queen Anne
- NRHP reference No.: 79003280
- VLR No.: 114-0108

Significant dates
- Added to NRHP: June 22, 1979
- Designated VLR: February 26, 1979

The William H. Trusty House is a historic home in the Phoebus section of Hampton, Virginia. It was built in 1897, and is a 2 1/2-story, wood-frame dwelling in the late Victorian style. It features a two-story, spindle-and-bracket porch, with a tent roof and capped by a finial. It was built by William H. Trusty, a successful black businessman and civic leader. Trusty owned a bar, five houses, and two Main Street Business properties. He was the son of freed parents from Prince George County, Virginia.

It was listed on the National Register of Historic Places in 1979.
