= Quarters 17 (Fort Monroe) =

Historic house in Virginia, United States

- U.S. National Register of Historic Places
- Virginia Landmarks Register
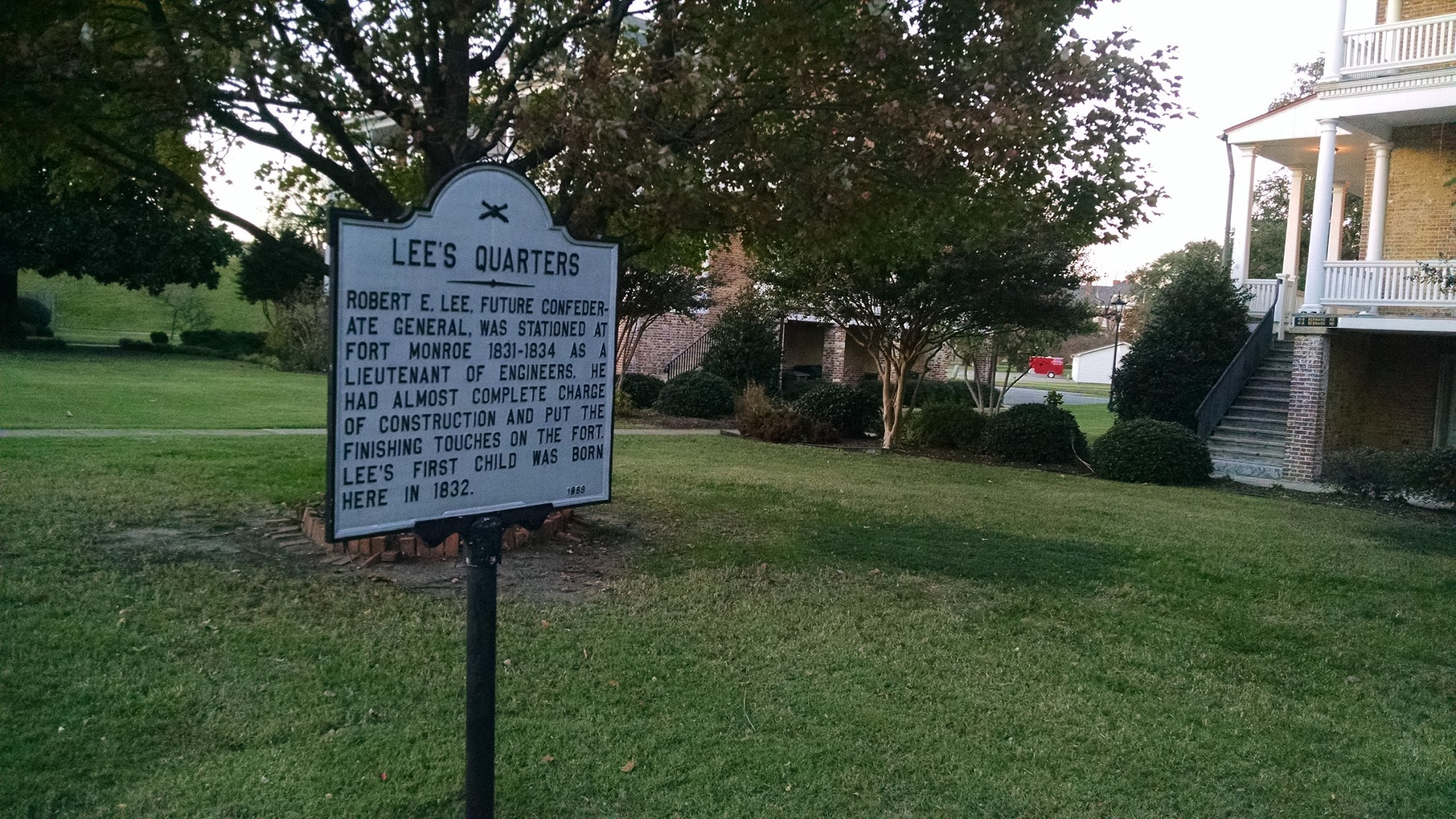

- Location within Virginia Location within the United States
- Location: 41A, 41B, 47A, 47B Bernard Rd., Fort Monroe, Hampton, Virginia
- Coordinates: 37°0′09″N 76°18′32″W
- Area: Less than one acre
- Built: 1823, 1907
- Architectural style: Federal
- NRHP reference No.: 10000584
- VLR No.: 114-0002-0005

Significant dates
- Added to NRHP: March 28, 2011
- Designated VLR: June 17, 2010

Quarters 17, also known as Building 17, Lee's Quarters, and the Tuileries, is a historic officer's quarters located at Fort Monroe, Hampton, Virginia. It was built in 1823, and is a two-story, six-bay, brick building with a rear ell in the Federal style. It has a three-story full façade front Tuscan order porch on both the first and second level. The building was renovated and the porch was added in 1907. The main section measures 65 feet wide, 37 feet, 9 inches deep, with an 18 by 23 feet rear ell. The original design was for housing eight junior officers, with later alterations to accommodate four families. It is one of two identical four family brick officer's quarters known as the Tuileries. Robert E. Lee moved to Fort Monroe in 1831 with his young bride into two rooms that formed a wing of the west side of Quarters 17. He resided there until November 1834.

It was listed on the National Register of Historic Places in 2011.
