= Quarters 1 (Fort Monroe) =

Historic house in Virginia, United States

- U.S. National Register of Historic Places
- Virginia Landmarks Register
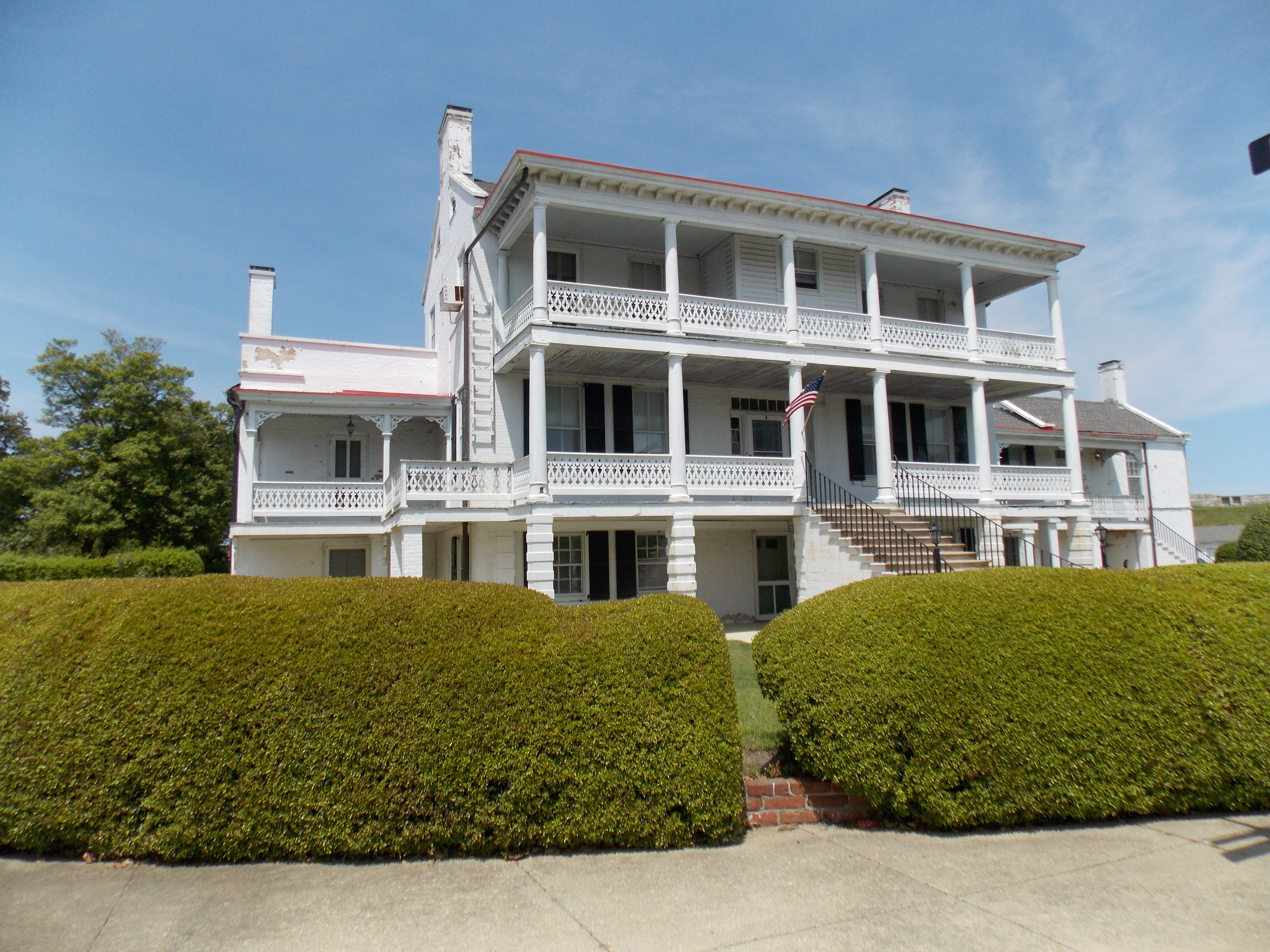

- Location within Virginia Location within the United States
- Location: 151 Bernard Rd., Fort Monroe, Hampton, Virginia
- Coordinates: 37°0′14″N 76°18′20″W
- Area: Less than one acre
- Built: 1819, 1823, 1871
- Architectural style: Federal
- NRHP reference No.: 10000583
- VLR No.: 114-0002-0004

Significant dates
- Added to NRHP: March 28, 2011
- Designated VLR: June 17, 2010

Quarters 1, also known as Building 1, is a historic officer's quarters located at Fort Monroe, Hampton, Virginia. The original section was built in 1819, and consists of a three-story, central block, double pile residence with flanking, two-story wings in the Federal style. The northern wing, containing a large kitchen and cistern below, was erected as a separate building in 1823 and later connected to the main building in 1871. The 1871 connecting structure includes an octagonal solarium. The front facade features two-story porches, with carpenter Gothic railings, that were added during the last quarter of the 19th century. The interior features an elliptical staircase and an elliptical dome.

The building was designed as a residence and headquarters for Fort Monroe's commanding officer. It served as headquarters of Fort Monroe from 1819 to 1907. It served as the quarters used by Abraham Lincoln while planning the attack on Norfolk during the American Civil War. Fort Monroe was decommissioned on September 15, 2011.

It was listed on the National Register of Historic Places in 2011.
