= Pasture Point Historic District =

Historic district in Virginia, United States

- U.S. National Register of Historic Places
- U.S. Historic district
- Virginia Landmarks Register
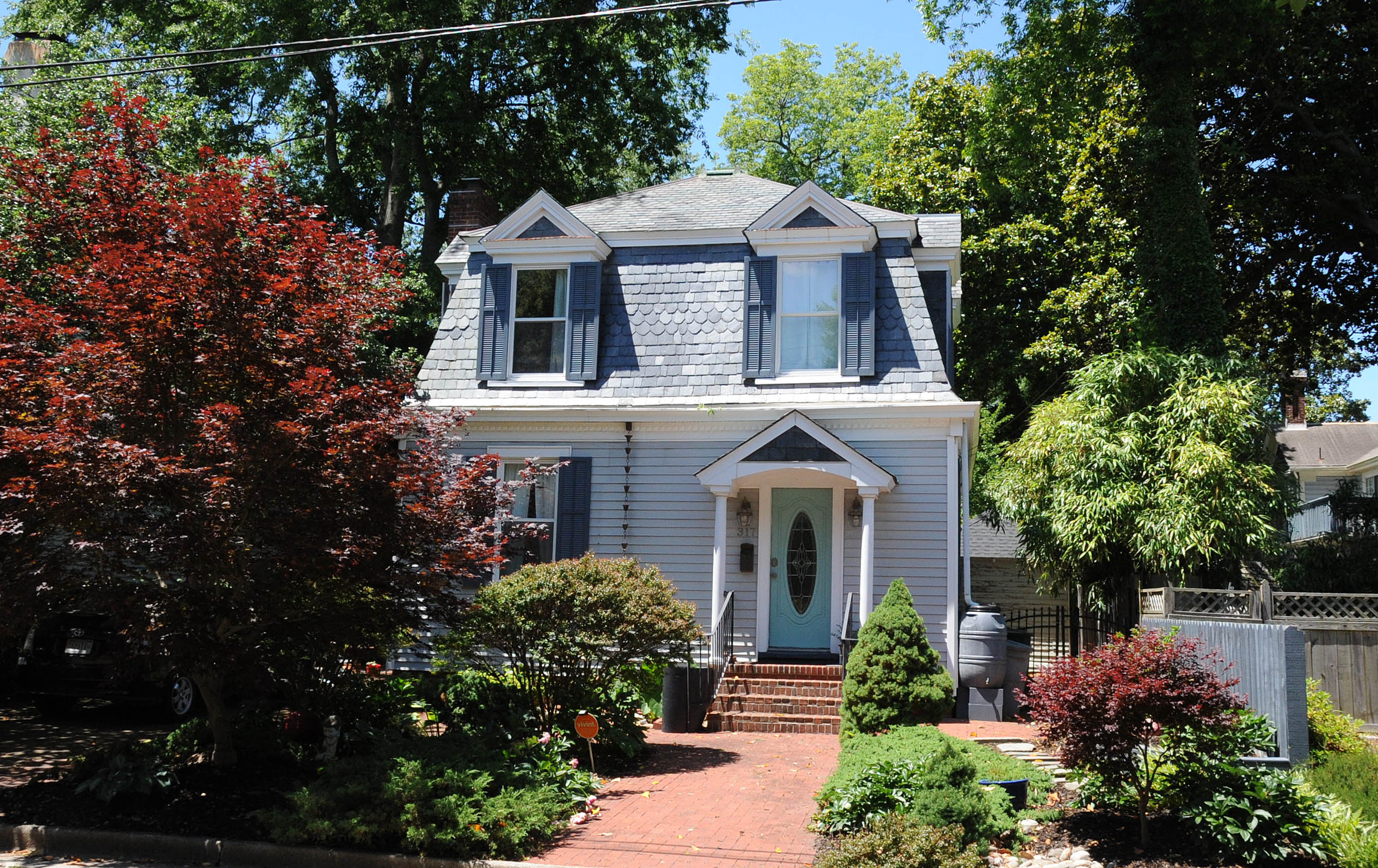

- Location within Virginia Location within the United States
- Location: Bounded by Hampton River on the east, Bright's Creek on the north, Wine St. on the west, and Syms St. on the south, Hampton, Virginia
- Coordinates: 37°01′56″N 76°20′26″W
- Area: 28 acres (11 ha)
- Built: 1885-1919
- Architect: Multiple
- Architectural style: Prairie School, Bungalow/Craftsman
- NRHP reference No.: 08000940
- VLR No.: 114-0118

Significant dates
- Added to NRHP: October 22, 2012
- Designated VLR: June 19, 2008

Pasture Point Historic District is a national historic district located at Hampton, Virginia. The district encompasses 110 contributing buildings in a streetcar suburb of Hampton platted in 1885. The residences include notable examples of the Late Victorian, Prairie School, and Bungalow styles. The district was largely developed by 1919, with some later infill dwellings.

It was listed on the National Register of Historic Places in 2012.
