= Riddleton, Tennessee =

- Unincorporated community
- Location within Tennessee Location within the United States
- Coordinates: 36°19′17″N 86°01′05″W
- Country: United States
- State: Tennessee
- County: Smith
- Elevation: 525 ft (160 m)
- Time zone: UTC-6 (Central (CST))
  - Summer (DST): UTC-5 (CDT)
- ZIP code: 37151
- Area code: 615
- GNIS feature ID: 1299387

Riddleton is an unincorporated community in Smith County, Tennessee, United States. It is located along Tennessee State Route 25 (Dixon Springs Highway) between Dixon Springs and Carthage. Riddleton has a post office, with ZIP code 37151.
