= The Fall of Man (disambiguation) =

The Fall of Man, in Christianity, refers to the transition of the first man and woman from a state of innocence to a state of guilty disobedience.

The Fall of Man may also refer to:

- The Fall of Man (Poulakis), a 17th-century tempera painting by Theodore Poulakis
- The Fall of Man (Rubens), a 1628–1629 painting by Peter Paul Rubens
- The Fall of Man (Titian), a c. 1550 painting by Titian

== See also ==
- The Fall and Expulsion from Paradise, a scene from the Sistine Chapel ceiling by Michelangelo
- The Garden of Eden with the Fall of Man, a c. 1615 painting by Peter Paul Rubens and Jan Brueghel the Elder
