= Coats of skin =

Clothes given to Adam and Eve by God

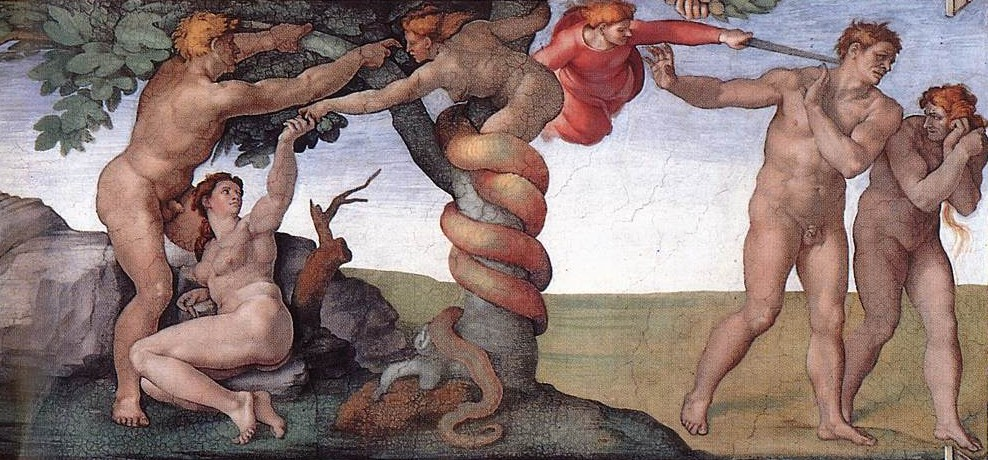
The Fall of Adam and Eve as depicted on the Sistine Chapel ceiling

In the biblical story of Adam and Eve, coats of skin (Hebrew: כתנות עור, romanized: kāṯənōṯ ‘ōr, sing. coat of skin) were the coverings Adam and Eve were given by God to cover their nakedness.

== Genesis 3:21 ==
As per the biblical interpretation of Genesis 3:21, Adam and Eve wrapped themselves in "coats of skin" in the garden after eating the forbidden fruit.

== Material ==
The material of coats is not clear. According to some interpretations of the Bible the garments were animal skins. If so, the question arises, who killed the animal.In Christian theology, they are seen as a symbol of salvation.

=== Wisdom ===
The fig-leaf aprons of Adam and Eve were ultimately ineffective, employed as a way of hiding themselves from God (Gen.3.8).

And they heard the sound of the Lord God walking in the garden in the cool of the day, and the man and his wife hid themselves from the presence of the Lord God among the trees of the garden.

— Genesis 3:8

God's creation of "coats of skins" were a sign of his recognition of the true needs of human beings ahead of their impending expulsion from the Garden.

And the LORD God made for Adam and his wife garments of skins and clothed them

— Genesis 3:21

== See also ==
- Biblical clothing
- Books of the Bible
