= The Fall of Man (Titian) =

1550 painting by Titian

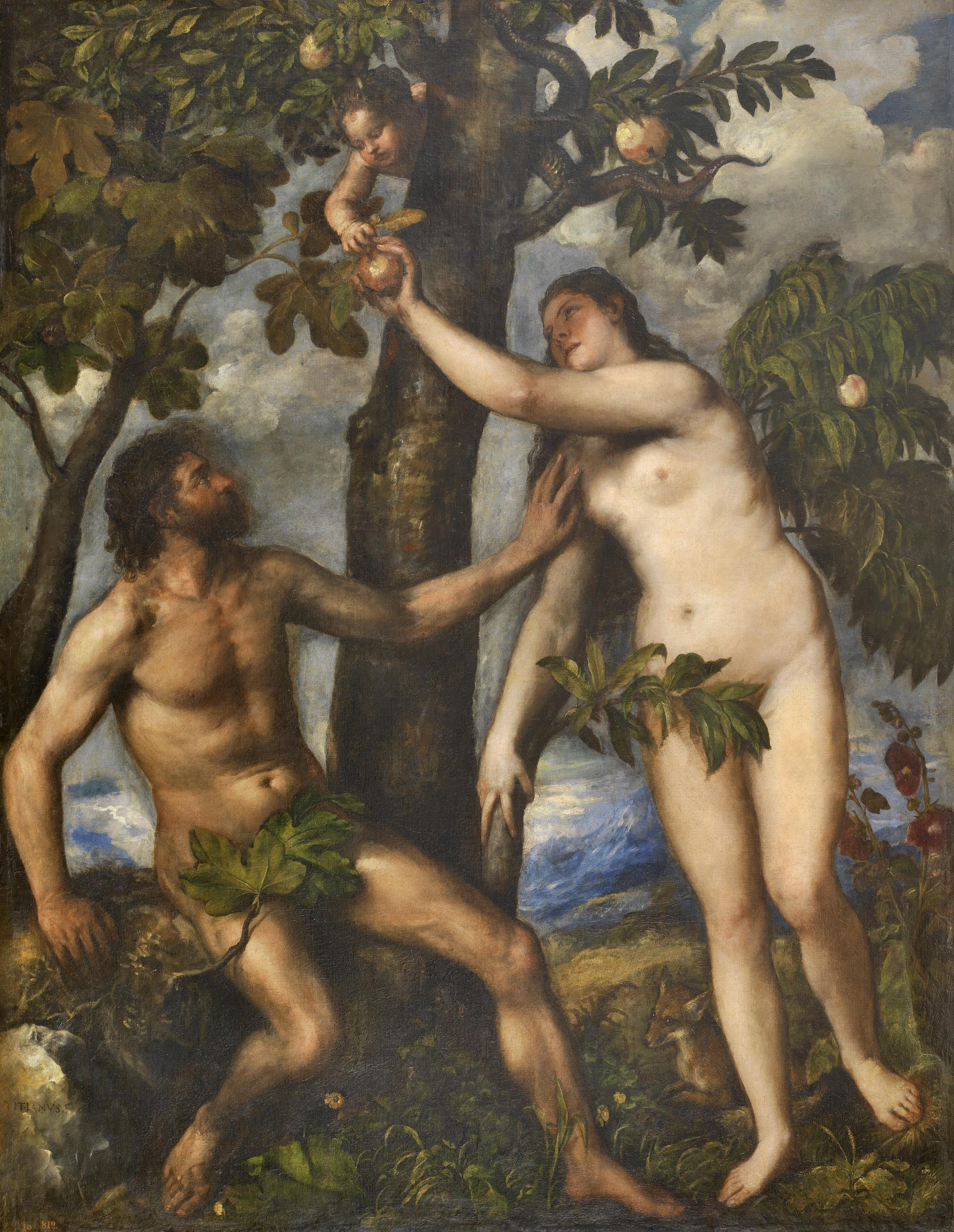
- The Fall of Man (c. 1550) by Titian
- Artist: Titian
- Year: 1550
- Type: Oil on Canvas
- Dimensions: 240 cm × 185 cm (94 in × 73 in)
- Location: Prado Museum, Madrid

The Fall of Man is a painting of the Fall of Man or story of Adam and Eve by the Venetian artist Titian, dating to c. 1550. It is held now in the Prado, in Madrid.

It was influenced by Raphael's fresco of the same subject in the Stanza della Signatura in the Vatican, which also had a seated Adam and standing Eve, as well by Albrecht Dürer's engraving Adam and Eve for smaller details. Owned at one point by Philip II of Spain's secretary, Antonio Pérez, and perhaps first commissioned by his father, in 1585 it entered the Spanish royal collection. It was there when it was copied by Rubens between 1628 and 1629 for his own version of the subject.

== See also ==
- List of works by Titian
