= Adam and Eve =

First man and woman in Abrahamic creation myth

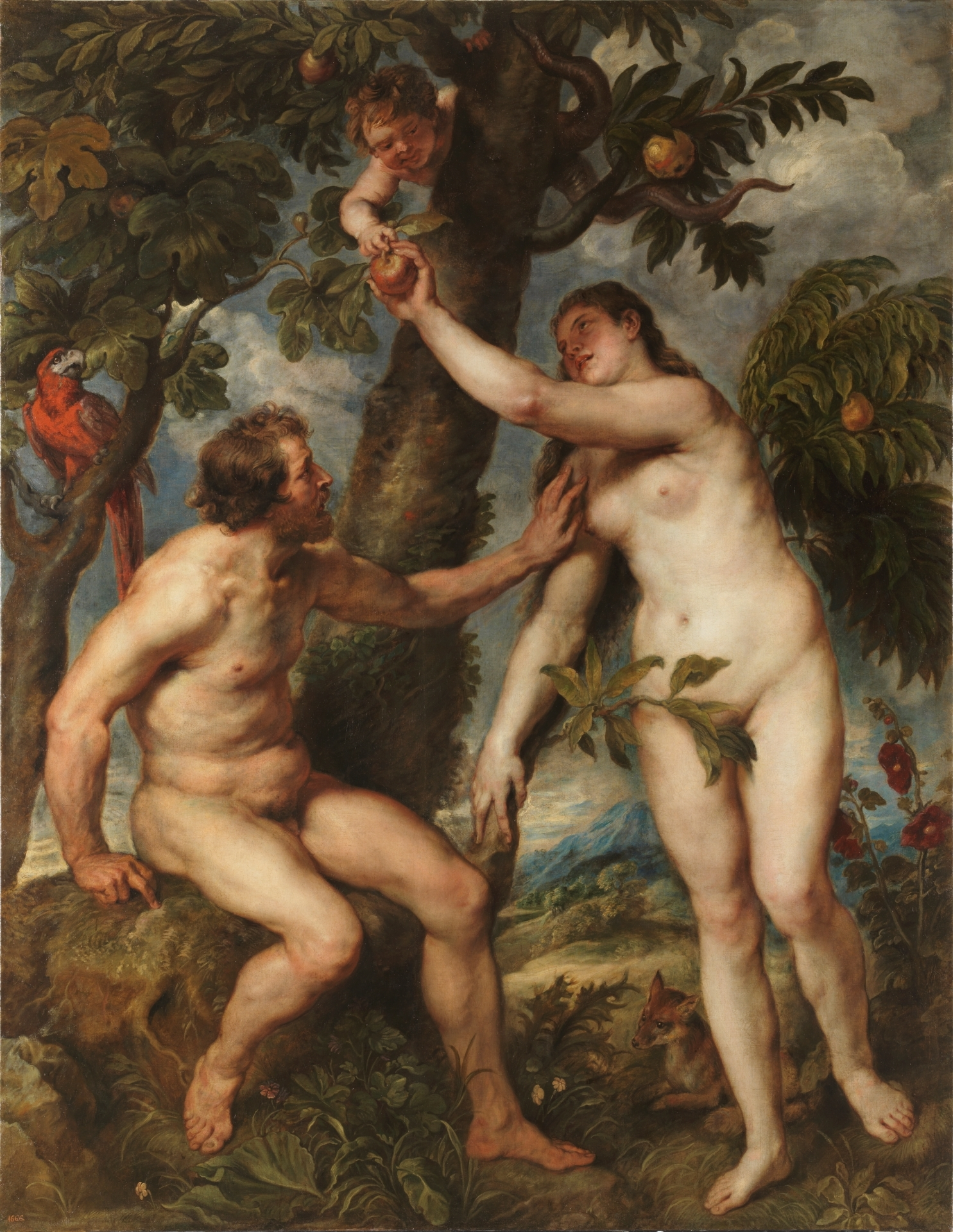
The Fall of Man by Peter Paul Rubens, 1628–29

Adam and Eve, according to the creation myth (Note: Myth in this case not meaning a false story, but rather a traditional story which embodies a belief regarding some fact or phenomenon of experience, and in which often the forces of nature and of the soul are personified; a sacred narrative regarding a god, a hero, the origin of the world or of a people, etc.) of the Abrahamic religions, were the first man and woman. They are central to the belief that humanity is in essence a single family, with everyone descended from a single pair of original ancestors. They also provide the basis for the doctrines of the fall of man and original sin, which are important beliefs in Christianity, although not held in Judaism or Islam.

In the Book of Genesis of the Hebrew Bible, chapters one through five, there are two creation narratives with two distinct perspectives. In the first, Adam and Eve are not named. Instead, God created humankind in God's image and instructed them to multiply and to be stewards over everything else that God had made. In the second narrative, God fashions Adam from dust and places him in the Garden of Eden. Adam is told that he can eat freely of all the trees in the garden, except for the tree of the knowledge of good and evil. Subsequently, Eve is created from one of Adam's ribs to be his companion. They are innocent and unembarrassed about their nakedness. However, a serpent convinces Eve to eat fruit from the forbidden tree, and she gives some of the fruit to Adam. These acts not only give them additional knowledge, but also give them the ability to conjure negative and destructive concepts such as shame and evil. God later curses the serpent and the ground. God prophetically tells the woman and the man what will be the consequences of their sin of disobeying him. Then he banishes them from the Garden of Eden.

Neither Adam nor Eve is mentioned elsewhere in the Hebrew scriptures apart from a single listing of Adam in a genealogy in 1 Chronicles 1:1, suggesting that although their story came to be prefixed to the Jewish story, it has little in common with it. The myth underwent extensive elaboration in later Abrahamic traditions, and it has been extensively analyzed by modern biblical scholars. Interpretations and beliefs regarding Adam and Eve and the story revolving around them vary across religions and sects; for example, the Islamic version of the story holds that Adam and Eve were equally responsible for their sins of hubris, instead of Eve being the first one to be unfaithful. The story of Adam and Eve is often depicted in art, and it has had an important influence in literature and poetry.

== Hebrew Bible narrative ==
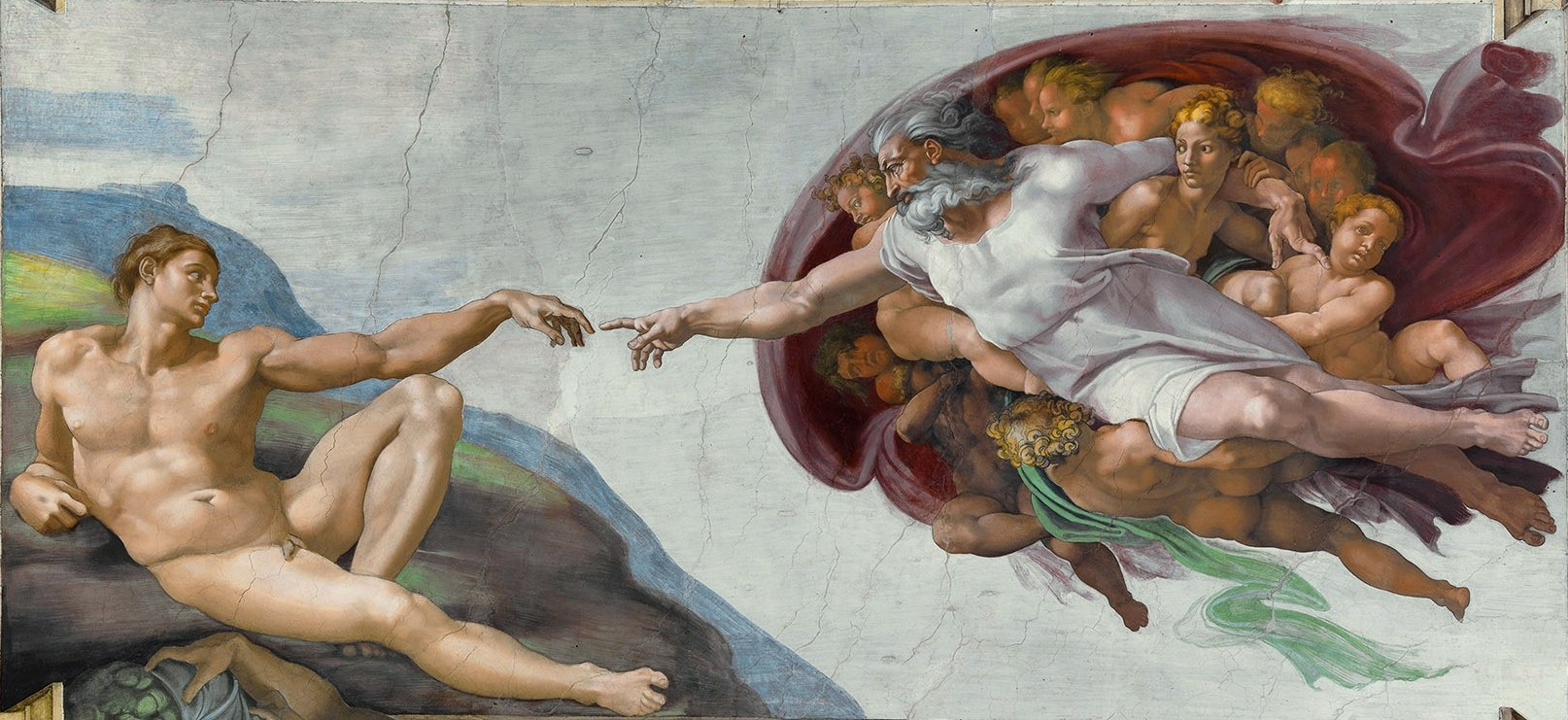
The Creation of Adam depicted on the Sistine Chapel ceiling by Michelangelo, 1508–1512

The opening chapters of the Book of Genesis provide a mythic history of the infiltration of evil into the world. God places the first man and woman (Adam and Eve) in his Garden of Eden, whence they are expelled; the first murder follows, and God's decision to destroy the world and save only the righteous Noah and his sons; a new humanity then descends from these and spreads throughout the world, but although the new world is as sinful as the old, God has resolved never again to destroy the world by flood, and the History ends with Terah, the father of Abraham, from whom will descend God's chosen people, the Israelites.

=== Creation narrative ===
Adam and Eve are the Bible's first man and first woman. Adam's name appears first in Genesis 1 with a collective sense, as "mankind"; subsequently in Genesis 2–3 it carries the definite article ha, equivalent to English 'the', indicating that this is "the man". In these chapters God fashions "the man" (ha adam) from earth (adamah), breathes life into his nostrils, and makes him a caretaker over creation. God next creates for the man an ezer kenegdo, a "helper corresponding to him", from his side or rib. The word 'rib' is a pun in Sumerian, as the word ti means both 'rib' and 'life'. She is called ishsha, "woman", because, the text says, she is formed from ish, "man". The man receives her with joy, and the reader is told that from this moment a man will leave his parents to "cling" to a woman, the two becoming one flesh.

=== The Fall ===
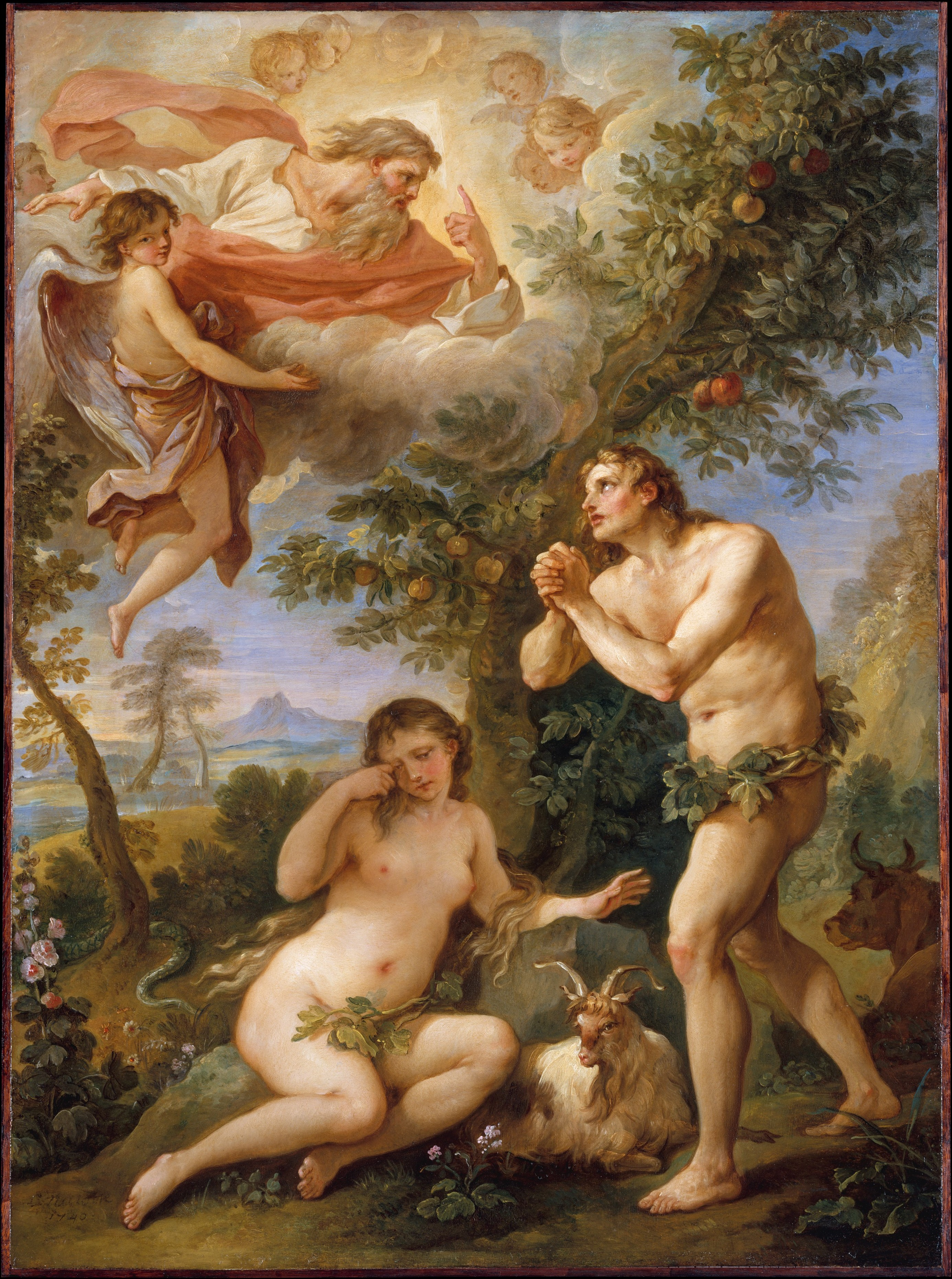
The Rebuke of Adam and Eve, Natoire, 1740

The first man and woman are in God's Garden of Eden, where all creation is vegetarian and there is no violence. They are permitted to eat the fruits of all the trees except one, the tree of the knowledge of good and evil. The woman is tempted by a talking serpent to eat the forbidden fruit, and gives some to the man, who eats also. (Contrary to popular myth she does not beguile the man, who appears to have been present at the encounter with the serpent). God punishes the man with a lifetime of hard labor followed by death, the woman with the pain of childbirth and subordination to her husband, and curses the serpent to crawl on its belly and endure enmity with both man and woman. God then clothes the nakedness of the man and woman, who have become god-like in knowing good and evil, then banishes them from the garden lest they eat the fruit of a second tree, the tree of life, and live forever.

=== Expulsion from Eden ===
The story continues in Genesis 3 with the "expulsion from Eden" narrative. A form analysis of Genesis 3 reveals that this portion of the story can be characterized as a parable or "wisdom tale" in the wisdom tradition. The poetic addresses of the chapter belong to a speculative type of wisdom that questions the paradoxes and harsh realities of life. This characterization is determined by the narrative's format, settings, and the plot. The form of Genesis 3 is also shaped by its vocabulary, making use of various puns and double entendres.

The expulsion from Eden narrative begins with a dialogue between the woman and a serpent, identified in Genesis 3:1 as an animal that was more crafty than any other animal made by God, although Genesis does not identify the serpent with Satan. The woman is willing to talk to the serpent and respond to the creature's cynicism by repeating God's prohibition against eating fruit from the tree of knowledge (Genesis 2:17). The woman is lured into dialogue on the serpent's terms which directly disputes God's command. The serpent assures the woman that God will not let her die if she ate the fruit, and, furthermore, that if she ate the fruit, her "eyes would be opened" and she would "be like God, knowing good and evil" (Genesis 3:5). The woman sees that the fruit of the tree of knowledge is "good for food", a delight to the eye, and that it would be desirable to acquire wisdom by eating the fruit. She eats the fruit and gives some to the man (Genesis 3:6). With this the man and woman recognize their own nakedness, and they make loincloths of fig leaves (Genesis 3:7).

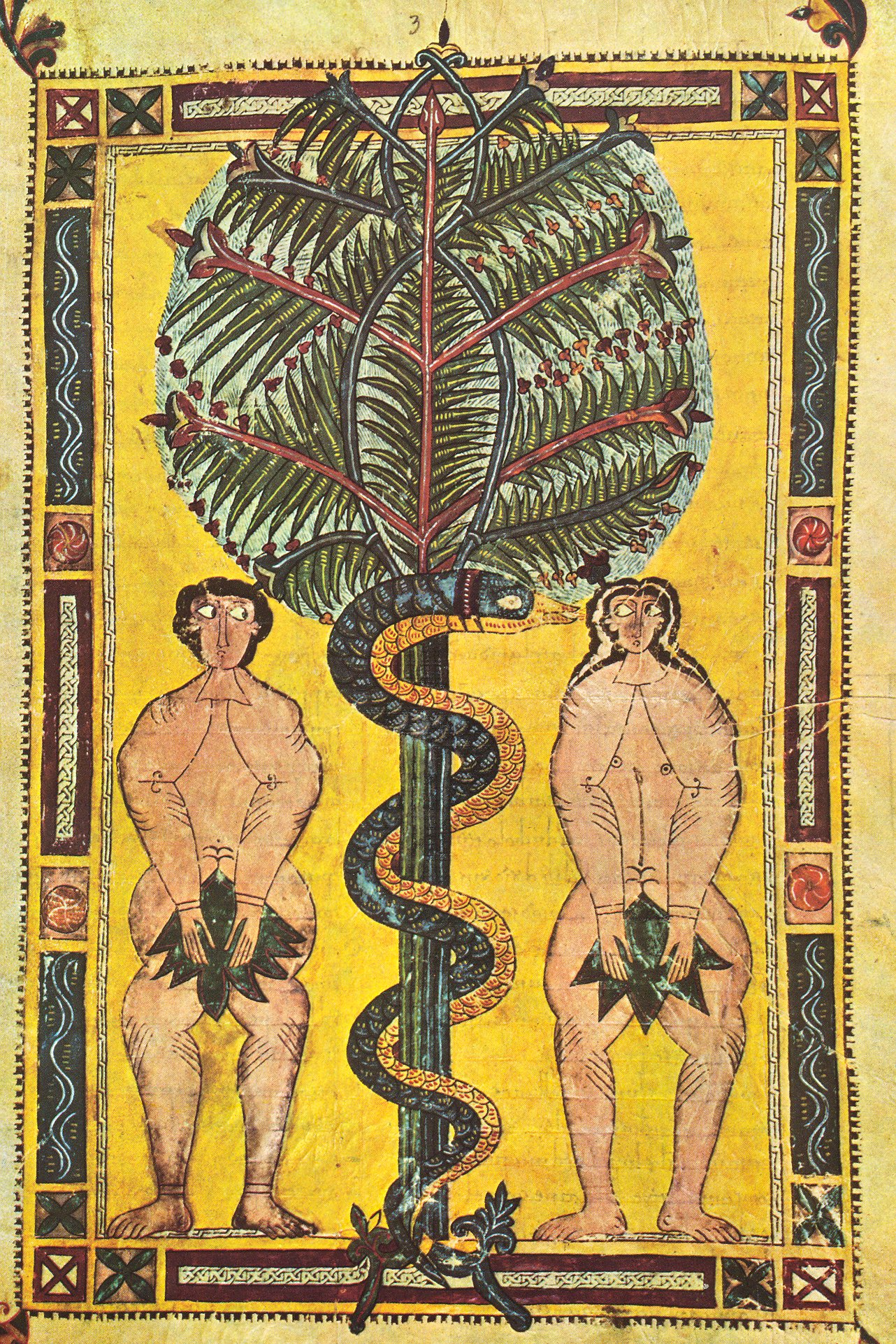
Adam and Eve in an illuminated manuscript (c. 950)

In the next narrative dialogue, God questions the man and the woman (Genesis 3:8–13), and God initiates a dialogue by calling out to the man with a rhetorical question designed to consider his wrongdoing. The man explains that he hid in the garden out of fear because he realized his own nakedness (Genesis 3:10). This is followed by two more rhetorical questions designed to show awareness of a defiance of God's command. The man then points to the woman as the real offender, and he implies that God is responsible for the tragedy because the woman was given to him by God (Genesis 3:12). God challenges the woman to explain herself, and she shifts the blame to the serpent (Genesis 3:13).

Divine pronouncement of three judgments is then laid against all the culprits (Genesis 3:14–19). A judgement oracle and the nature of the crime is first laid upon the serpent, then the woman, and, finally, the man. On the serpent, God places a divine curse. The woman receives penalties that impact her in two primary roles: she shall experience pangs during childbearing, pain during childbirth, and while she shall desire her husband, he will rule over her. The man's penalty results in God cursing the ground from which he came, and the man then receives a death oracle, although the man has not been described, in the text, as immortal. Abruptly, in the flow of text, in Genesis 3:20, the man names the woman "Eve" (Hebrew hawwah), "because she was the mother of all living". God makes skin garments for Adam and Eve (Genesis 3:20).

The chiasmus structure of the death oracle given to Adam in Genesis 3:19 is a link between man's creation from "dust" (Genesis 2:7) to the "return" of his beginnings: "you return, to the ground, since from it you were taken, for dust you are, and to dust, you will return."

The garden account ends with an intradivine monologue, determining the couple's expulsion, and the execution of that deliberation (Genesis 3:22–24). The reason given for the expulsion was to prevent the man from eating from the tree of life and becoming immortal: "Behold, the man is become as one of us, to know good and evil; and now, lest he put forth his hand, and take also of the tree of life, and eat, and live for ever" (Genesis 3:22). God exiles Adam and Eve from the Garden and installs cherubs (supernatural beings that provide protection) and the "flaming sword" which turned every way, "apparently in constant motion", to guard the entrance (Genesis 3:24).

=== Offspring ===
Story of Adam, Eve, Cain, Abel and Lamech

Genesis 4 narrates life outside the garden, including the birth of Adam and Eve's first children Cain and Abel and the story of the first murder. A third son, Seth, is born to Adam and Eve, and Adam had "other sons and daughters" (Genesis 5:4). Genesis 5 lists Adam's descendants from Seth to Noah with their ages at the birth of their first sons and their ages at death. Adam's age at death is given as 930 years. According to the Book of Jubilees, Cain married his sister Awan, a daughter of Adam and Eve. According to the Pseudo-Philo, Adam and Eve's male children were: Eliseel, Suris, Elamiel, Brabal, Naat, Zarama, Zasam, Maathal, and Anath; and Adam and Eve's female children were: Phua, Iectas, Arebica, Sifa, Tecia, Saba, and Asin.

== Textual history ==
The Primeval History forms the opening chapters of the Torah, the five books making up the history of the origins of Israel. This achieved something like its current form in the 5th century BCE, but Genesis 1–11 shows little relationship to the rest of the Bible: for example, the names of its characters and its geography – Adam (man) and Eve (life), the Land of Nod ("Wandering"), and so on – are symbolic rather than real, and almost none of the persons, places and stories mentioned in it are ever met anywhere else. This has led scholars to suppose that the History forms a late composition attached to Genesis and the Pentateuch to serve as an introduction. Just how late is a subject for debate: at one extreme are those who see it as a product of the Hellenistic period, in which case it cannot be earlier than the first decades of the 4th century BCE; on the other hand the Yahwist source has been dated by some scholars, notably John Van Seters, to the exilic pre-Persian period (the 6th century BCE) precisely because the Primeval History contains so much Babylonian influence in the form of myth. (Note: See John Van Seters, Prologue to History: The Yahwist as Historian in Genesis (1992), pp.80, 155–156.) The Primeval History draws on two distinct "sources", the Priestly source and what is sometimes called the Yahwist source and sometimes simply the "non-Priestly"; for the purpose of discussing Adam and Eve in the Book of Genesis the terms "non-Priestly" and "Yahwist" can be regarded as interchangeable.

== Abrahamic traditions ==
=== Judaism ===
It was also recognized in ancient Judaism that there are two distinct accounts for the creation of man. The first account says "male and female [God] created them", implying simultaneous creation, whereas the second account states that God created Eve subsequent to the creation of Adam. The Midrash Rabbah – Genesis VIII:1 reconciled the two by stating that Genesis one, "male and female He created them", indicates that God originally created Adam as a hermaphrodite, bodily and spiritually both male and female, before creating the separate beings of Adam and Eve. Other rabbis suggested that Eve and the woman of the first account were two separate individuals, the first being identified as Lilith, a figure elsewhere described as a night demon.

According to traditional Jewish belief, Adam and Eve are buried in the Cave of Machpelah, in Hebron.

In Genesis 2:7 "God breathes into the man's nostrils and he becomes nefesh hayya", signifying something like the English word "being", in the sense of a corporeal body capable of life; the concept of a "soul" in the modern sense, did not exist in Hebrew thought until around the 2nd century BC, when the idea of a bodily resurrection gained popularity.

=== Christianity ===
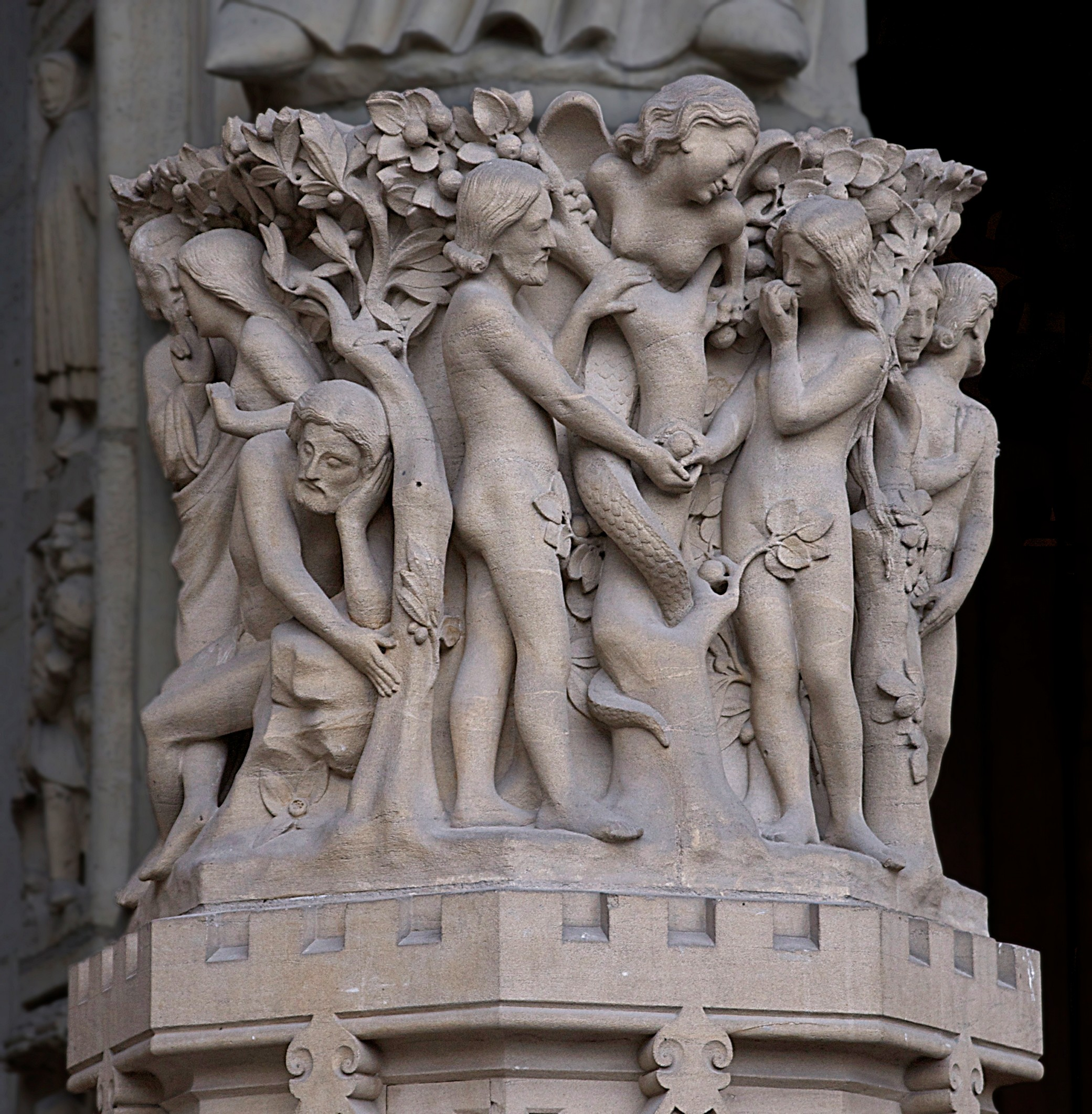
Adam, Eve, and the (female) serpent (often identified as Lilith) at the entrance to Notre Dame Cathedral in Paris

Some early fathers of the Christian church held Eve responsible for the Fall of man and all subsequent women to be the first sinners because Eve tempted Adam to commit the taboo. "You are the devil's gateway" Tertullian told his female readers, and went on to explain that they were responsible for the death of Christ: "On account of your desert [i.e., punishment for sin, that is, death], even the Son of God had to die." In 1486, the Dominicans Kramer and Sprenger used similar tracts in Malleus Maleficarum ("Hammer of Witches") to justify the persecution of "witches".

Medieval Christian art often depicted the Edenic Serpent as a woman (often identified as Lilith), thus both emphasizing the serpent's seductiveness as well as its relationship to Eve. Several early Church Fathers, including Clement of Alexandria and Eusebius of Caesarea, interpreted the Hebrew "Heva" as not only the name of Eve, but in its aspirated form as "female serpent."

Based on the Christian doctrine of the Fall of man, came the doctrine of original sin. St Augustine of Hippo (354–430), working with the Epistle to the Romans, interpreted the Apostle Paul as having said that Adam's sin was hereditary: "Death passed upon [i.e., spread to] all men because of Adam, [in whom] all sinned", Romans 5:12 Original sin became a concept that man is born into a condition of sinfulness and must await redemption. This doctrine became a cornerstone of the Western Christian theological tradition, which however not shared by Judaism or the Orthodox churches.

Over the centuries, a system of unique Christian beliefs had developed from these doctrines. Baptism became understood as a washing away of the stain of hereditary sin in many churches, although its original symbolism was apparently rebirth. Additionally, the serpent that tempted Eve was interpreted to have been Satan, or that Satan was using a serpent as a mouthpiece, although there is no mention of this identification in the Torah and it is not held in Judaism.

As well as developing the theology of the protoplasts, the medieval Church also expanded the historical narrative in a vast tradition of Adam books, which add detail to the fall, and tell of their life after the expulsion from Eden. These are continued in the Legend of the Rood, dealing with Seth's return to Paradise and subsequent events involving the wood from the tree of life. These stories were widely believed in Europe until early modern times.

Regarding the real existence of the progenitors – as of other narratives contained in Genesis – the Catholic Church teaches that Adam and Eve were historical humans, personally responsible for the original sin. This position was clarified by Pope Pius XII in the encyclical Humani Generis, in which the Pope condemned the theory of polygenism and expressed that original sin comes "from a sin actually committed by an individual Adam". Despite this, the Humani Generis also states that the belief in evolution is not in contrast to Catholic doctrine; this has led to a gradual acceptance of theistic evolution among Roman Catholic and Independent Catholic theologians, a position that has been encouraged by Pope John Paul II, Pope Benedict XVI and Pope Francis.

The biblical fall of Adam and Eve is also understood by some Christians (especially those in the Eastern Orthodox tradition) as a reality outside of empirical history that effects the entire history of the universe. This concept of an atemporal fall has been most recently expounded by the Orthodox theologians David Bentley Hart, John Behr, and Sergei Bulgakov, but it has roots in the writings of several early church fathers, especially Origen and Maximus the Confessor. Bulgakov writes in his 1939 book The Bride of the Lamb translated by Boris Jakim (Wm. B. Eerdmans, 2001) that "empirical history begins precisely with the fall, which is its starting premise" and that in the "narrative in Genesis 3, ...an event is described that lies beyond our history, although at its boundary." David Bentley Hart has written about this concept of an atemporal fall in his 2005 book The Doors of the Sea as well as in his essay "The Devil's March: Creatio ex Nihilo, the Problem of Evil, and a Few Dostoyevskian Meditations" (from his 2020 book Theological Territories).

=== Gnostic traditions ===
Gnostics discussed Adam and Eve in two known surviving texts, namely the "Apocalypse of Adam" found in the Nag Hammadi documents and the Testament of Adam. The creation of Adam as Protoanthropos, the original man, is the focal concept of these writings.

Another Gnostic tradition held that Adam and Eve were created to help defeat Satan. The serpent, instead of being identified with Satan, is seen as a hero by the Ophites. Still other Gnostics believed that Satan's fall, however, came after the creation of humanity. As in Islamic tradition, this story says that Satan refused to bow to Adam due to pride. Satan said that Adam was inferior to him as he was made of fire, whereas Adam was made of clay. This refusal led to the fall of Satan recorded in works such as the Book of Enoch.

In Mandaeism, "(God) created all the worlds, formed the soul through his power, and placed it by means of angels into the human body. So He created Adam and Eve, the first man and woman." In Yazidism, a syncretic religion, most of humanity is descended from Adam and Eve, while Yazidis are descended from Adam alone, tracing this story to Gnostic Christian origins.

=== Islam ===
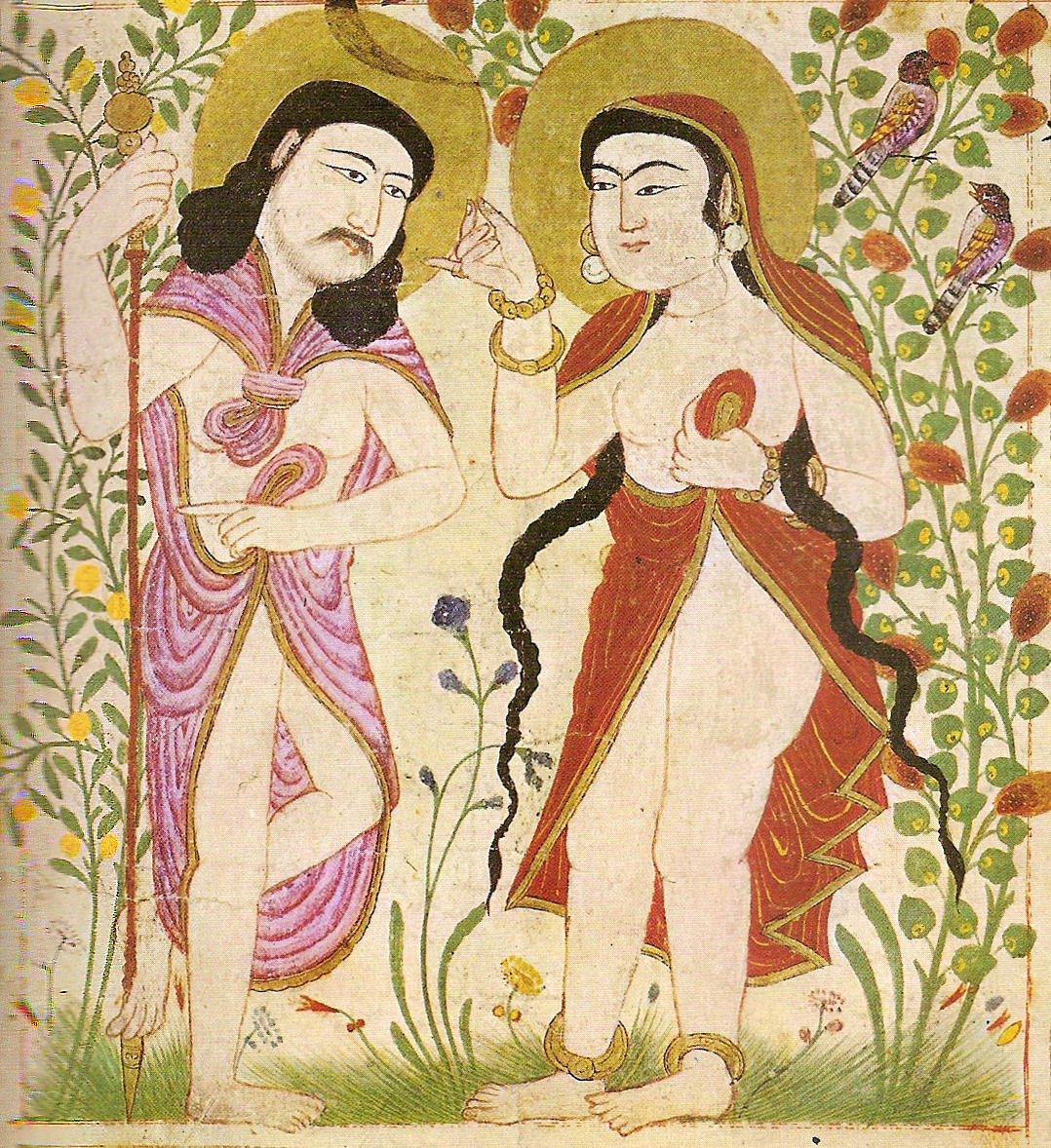
Painting from Manafi al-Hayawan (The Useful Animals), depicting Adam and Eve. From Maragheh in Iran, 1294–99

In Islam, Adam (Ādam; Arabic: آدم), whose role is being the father of humanity, is looked upon by Muslims with reverence. Eve (Ḥawwāʼ; Arabic: حواء ) is the "mother of humanity". The creation of Adam and Eve is referred to in the Qurʼān, although different Qurʼanic interpreters give different views on the actual creation story (Qurʼan, Surat al-Nisaʼ, verse 1).

In al-Qummi's tafsir on the Garden of Eden, such a place was not entirely earthly. According to the Qurʼān, both Adam and Eve ate the forbidden fruit in a Heavenly Eden. As a result, they were both sent down to Earth as God's representatives. Each person was sent to a mountain peak: Adam on al-Safa, and Eve on al-Marwah. In this Islamic tradition, Adam wept for 40 days until he repented, after which God sent down the Black Stone, teaching him the Hajj. According to a prophetic hadith, Adam and Eve reunited in the plain of ʻArafat, near Mecca. They had multiple children, particularly, Qabil and Habil. There is also a legend of a younger son, named Rocail, who created a palace and sepulchre containing autonomous statues that lived out the lives of men so realistically they were mistaken for having souls.

The concept of "original sin" does not exist in Islam because, according to Islam, Adam and Eve were forgiven by God. When God orders the angels to bow to Adam, Iblīs questioned, "Why should I bow to man? I am made of pure fire and he is made of soil." The liberal movements within Islam have viewed God's commanding the angels to bow before Adam as an exaltation of humanity, and as a means of supporting human rights; others view it as an act of showing Adam that the biggest enemy of humans on earth will be their ego.

In Swahili literature, Eve ate from the forbidden tree, thus causing her expulsion, after being tempted by Iblis. Thereupon, Adam heroically eats the forbidden fruit in order to follow Eve and protect her on earth.

=== Baháʼí Faith ===
In the Baháʼí Faith, Adam is regarded as the first Manifestation of God. The Adam and Eve narrative is seen as symbolic. In Some Answered Questions, 'Abdu'l-Bahá rejects a literal reading and states that the story contains "divine mysteries and universal meanings". Adam symbolizes the "spirit of Adam", Eve symbolizes "His self", the Tree of Knowledge symbolizes "the material world", and the serpent symbolizes "attachment to the material world". The fall of Adam thus represents the way humanity became conscious of good and evil. In another sense, Adam and Eve represent God's Will and Determination, the first two of the seven stages of Divine Creative Action.

== Historicity ==
While a traditional view attributes the Book of Genesis to Mosaic authorship, modern scholars consider the Genesis creation narrative as one of various ancient origin myths.

Analysis like the documentary hypothesis also suggests that the text is a result of the compilation of multiple previous traditions, explaining apparent contradictions. Other stories of the same canonical book, like the Genesis flood narrative, are also understood as having been influenced by older literature, with parallels in the older Epic of Gilgamesh.

== Arts and literature ==
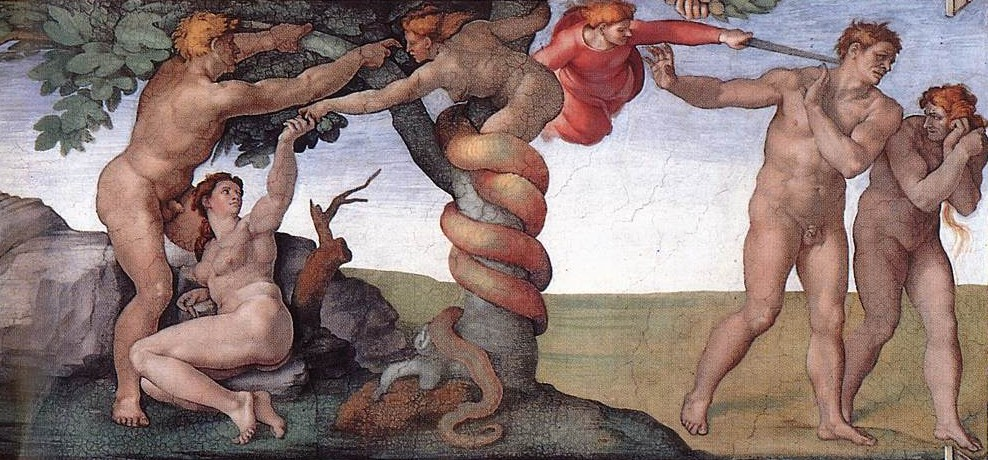
The Fall of Adam and Eve as depicted on the Sistine Chapel ceiling

John Milton's Paradise Lost, a famous 17th-century epic poem written in blank verse, explores and elaborates upon the story of Adam and Eve in great detail. As opposed to the biblical Adam, Milton's Adam is given a glimpse of the future of mankind, by the archangel Michael, before he has to leave Paradise.

Mark Twain wrote humorous and satirical diaries for Adam and Eve in both "Eve's Diary" (1906) and The Private Life of Adam and Eve (1931), posthumously published.

C. L. Moore's 1940 story Fruit of Knowledge is a re-telling of the Fall of Man as a love triangle between Lilith, Adam and Eve – with Eve's eating the forbidden fruit being in this version the result of misguided manipulations by the jealous Lilith, who had hoped to get her rival discredited and destroyed by God and thus regain Adam's love.

In Stephen Schwartz's 1991 musical Children of Eden, "Father" (God) creates Adam and Eve at the same time and considers them his children. They even assist Him in naming the animals. When Eve is tempted by the serpent and eats the forbidden fruit, Father makes Adam choose between Him and Eden, or Eve. Adam chooses Eve and eats the fruit, causing Father to banish them into the wilderness and destroying the Tree of Knowledge, from which Adam carves a staff. Eve gives birth to Cain and Abel, and Adam forbids his children from going beyond the waterfall in hopes Father will forgive them and bring them back to Eden. When Cain and Abel grow up, Cain breaks his promise and goes beyond the waterfall, finding the giant stones made by other humans, which he brings the family to see, and Adam reveals his discovery from the past: during their infancy, he discovered these humans, but had kept it secret. He tries to forbid Cain from seeking them out, which causes Cain to become enraged and he tries to attack Adam, but instead turns his rage to Abel when he tries to stop him and kills him. Later, when an elderly Eve tries to speak to Father, she tells how Adam continually looked for Cain, and after many years, he dies and is buried underneath the waterfall. Eve also gave birth to Seth, which expanded hers and Adam's generations. Finally, Father speaks to her to bring her home. Before she dies, she gives her blessings to all her future generations, and passes Adam's staff to Seth. Father embraces Eve and she also reunited with Adam and Abel. Smaller casts usually have the actors cast as Adam and Eve double as Noah and Mama Noah.

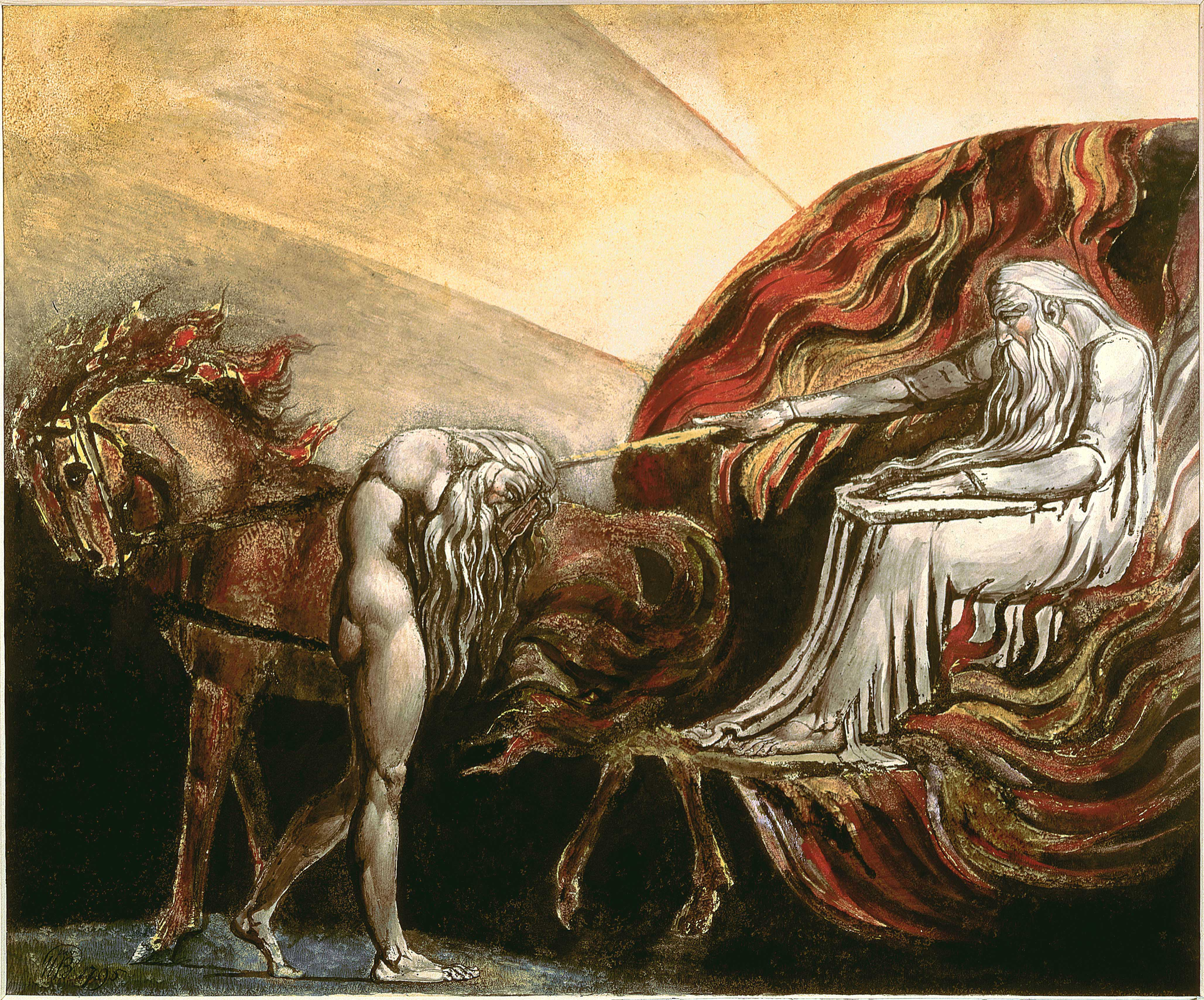
God Judging Adam by William Blake, 1795, Tate Collection

In Ray Nelson's novel Blake's Progress the poet William Blake and his wife Kate travel to the end of time where the demonic Urizen offers them his own re-interpretation of the Biblical story: "In this painting you see Adam and Eve listening to the wisdom of their good friend and adviser, the serpent. One might even say he was their Savior. He gave them freedom, and he would have given them eternal life if he'd been allowed to."

John William "Uncle Jack" Dey painted Adam and Eve Leave Eden (1973), using stripes and dabs of pure color to evoke Eden's lush surroundings.

In C.S. Lewis' 1943 science fiction novel Perelandra, the story of Adam and Eve is re-enacted on the planet Venus – but with a different ending. A green-skinned pair, who are destined to be the ancestors of Venusian humanity, are living in naked innocence on wonderful floating islands which are the Venusian Eden; a demonically possessed Earth scientist arrives in a spaceship, acting the part of the snake and trying to tempt the Venusian Eve into disobeying God; but the protagonist, Cambridge scholar Ransom, succeeds in thwarting him, so that Venusian humanity will have a glorious future, free of original sin.

=== Image gallery ===
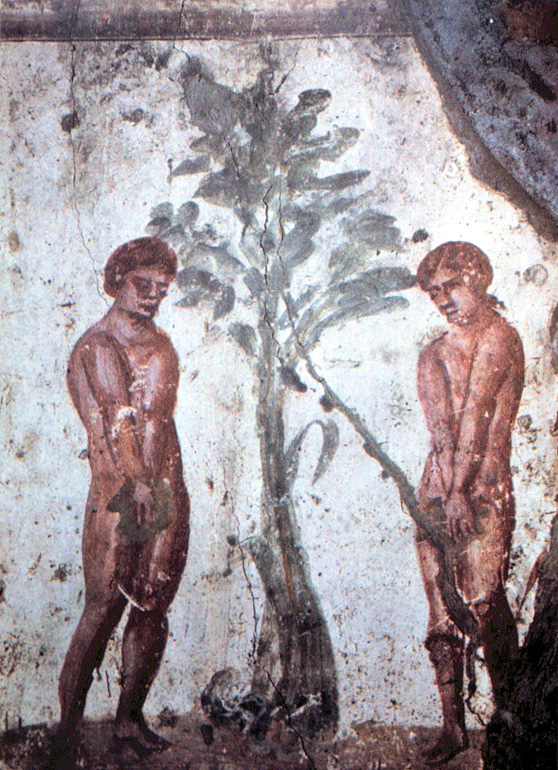
Early Christian depiction of Adam and Eve in the Catacombs of Marcellinus and Peter

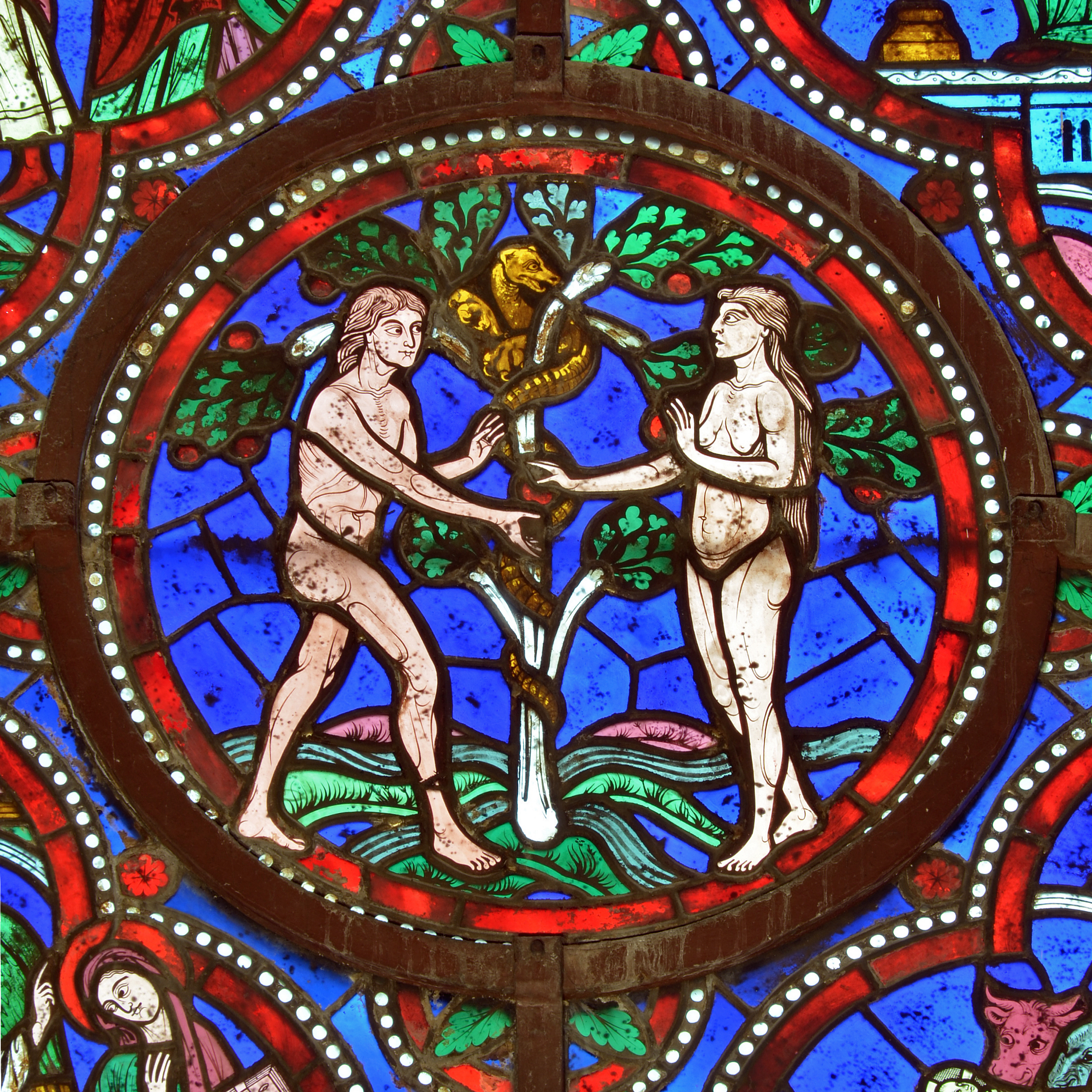
Detail of a stained glass window (12th century) in Saint-Julien cathedral - Le Mans, France

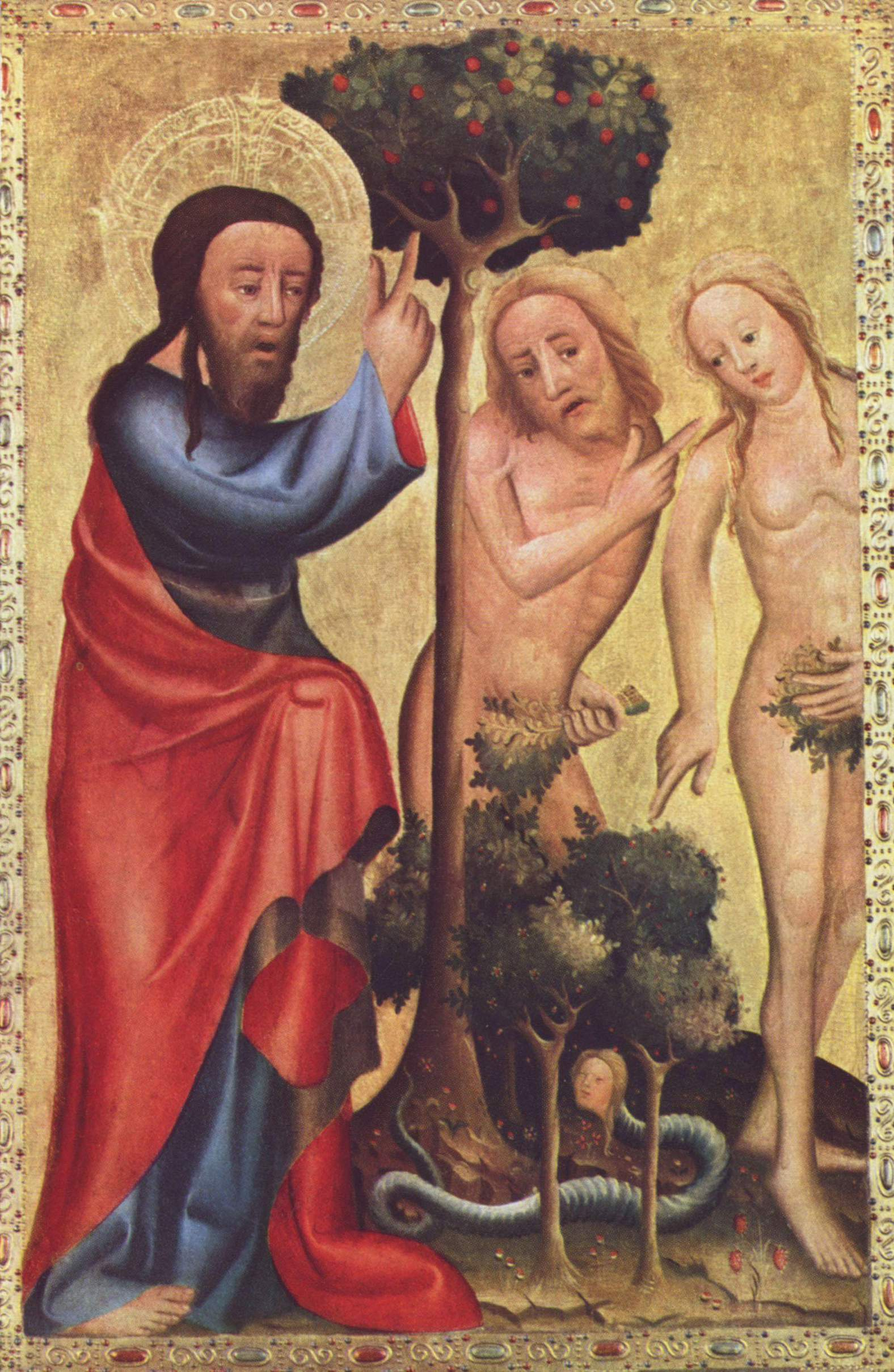
Depiction of the Fall in Kunsthalle Hamburg, by Master Bertram, 1375-1383

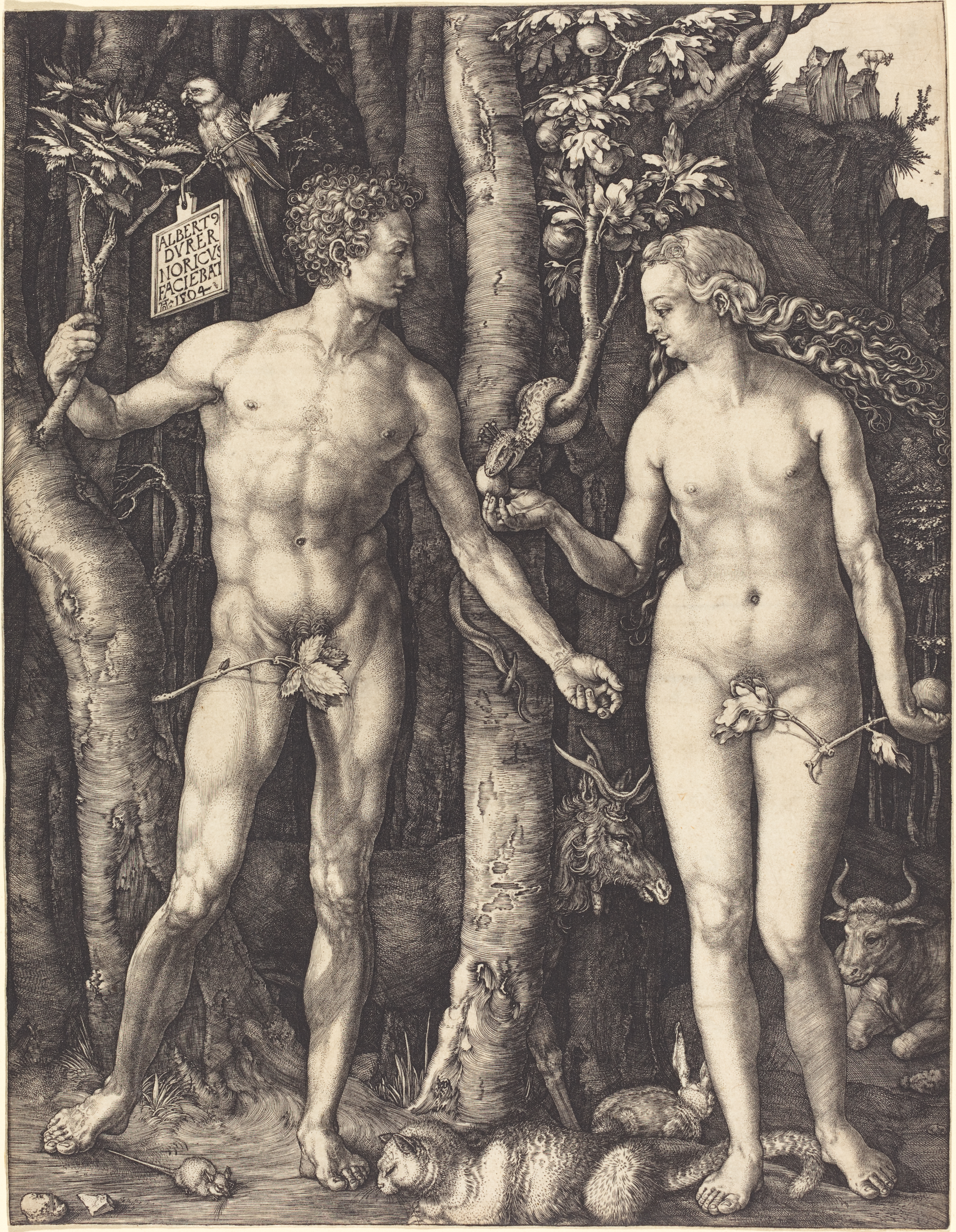
Adam and Eve, engraving by Albrecht Dürer, 1504 (National Gallery of Art)

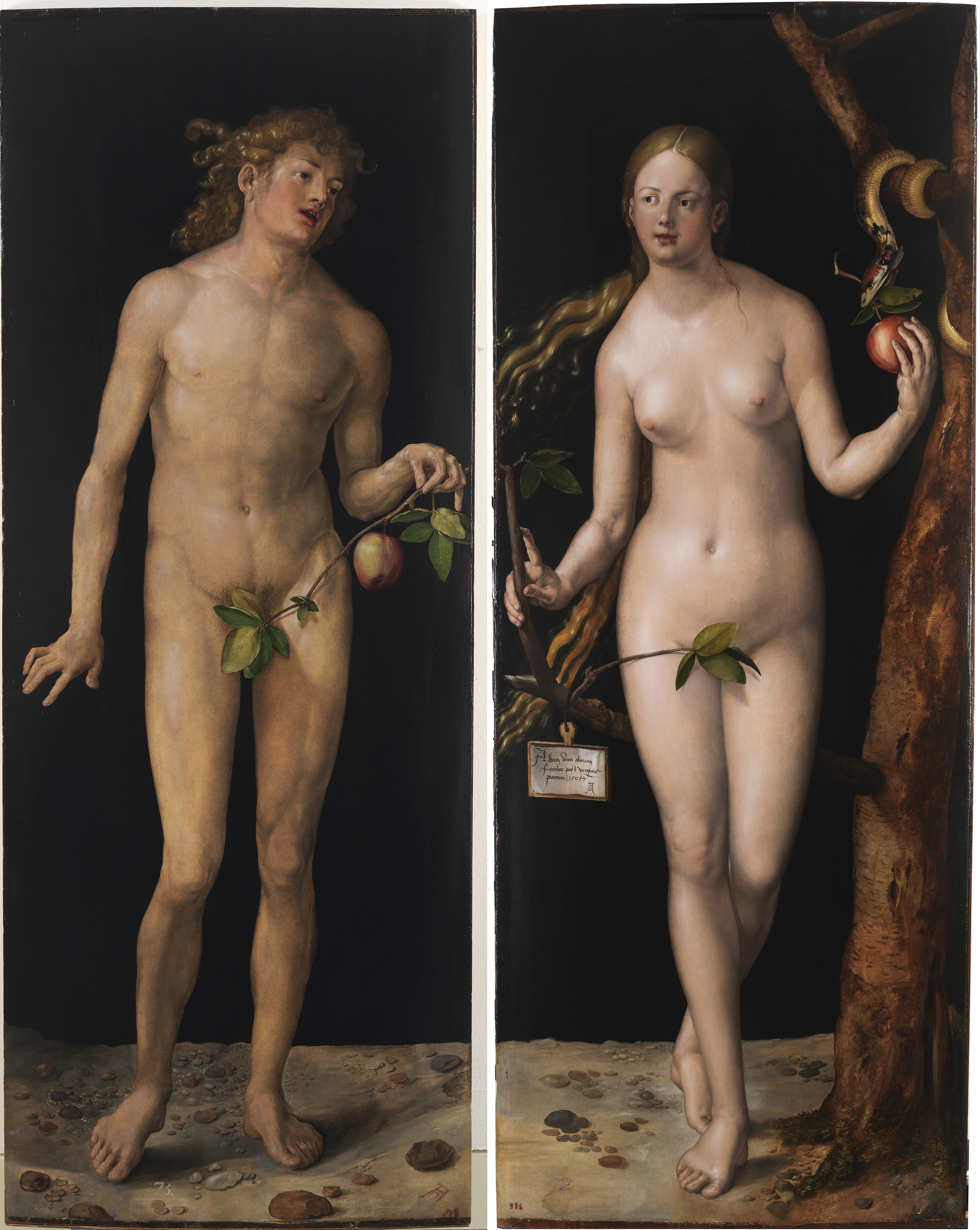
Adam and Eve by Albrecht Dürer, 1507

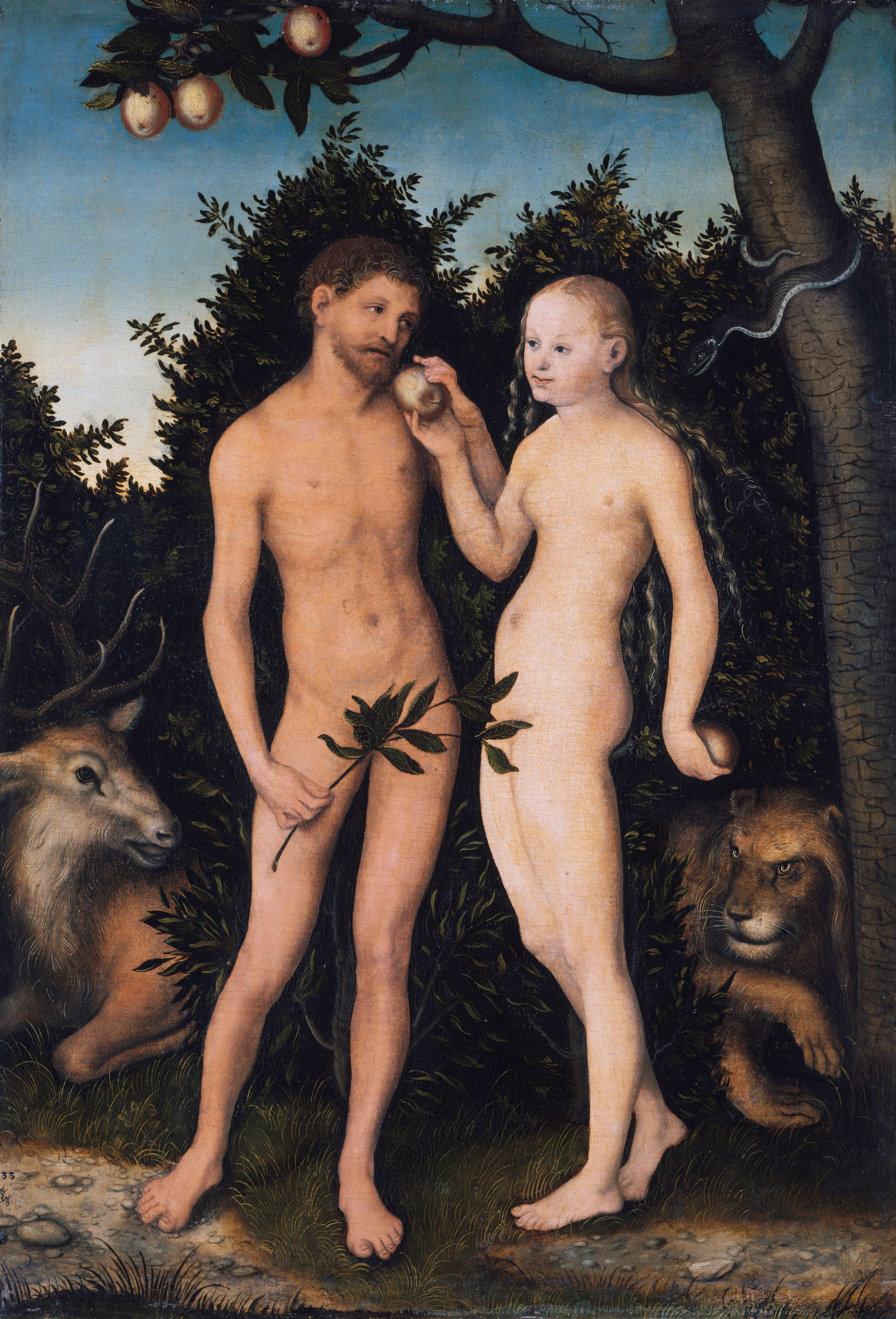
Adam and Eve in paradise (The Fall), Eve gives Adam the forbidden fruit, by Lucas Cranach the Elder, 1533

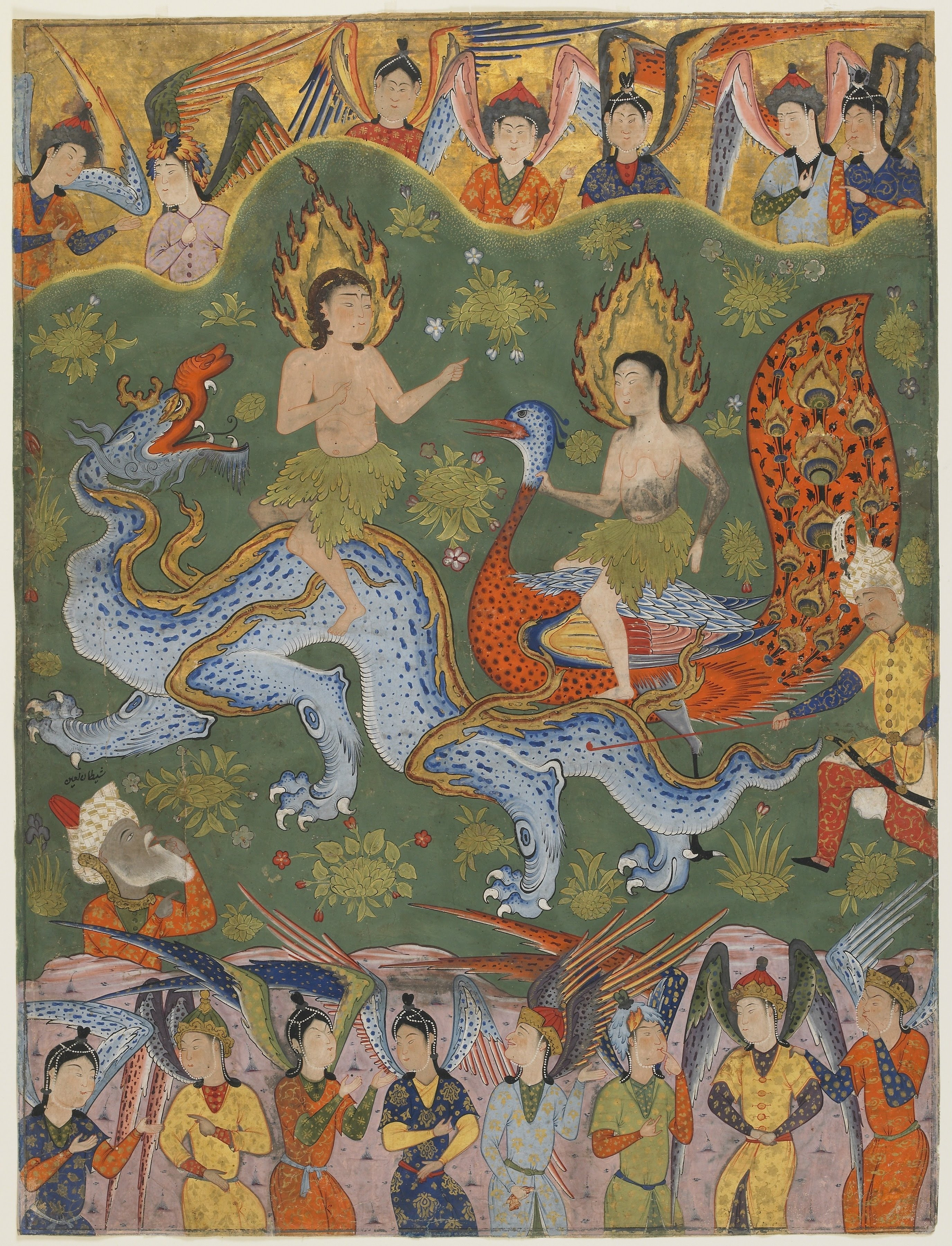
Adam and Eve from a copy of the Falnama (Book of Omens) ascribed to Ja'far al-Sadiq, c. 1550, Safavid dynasty, Iran

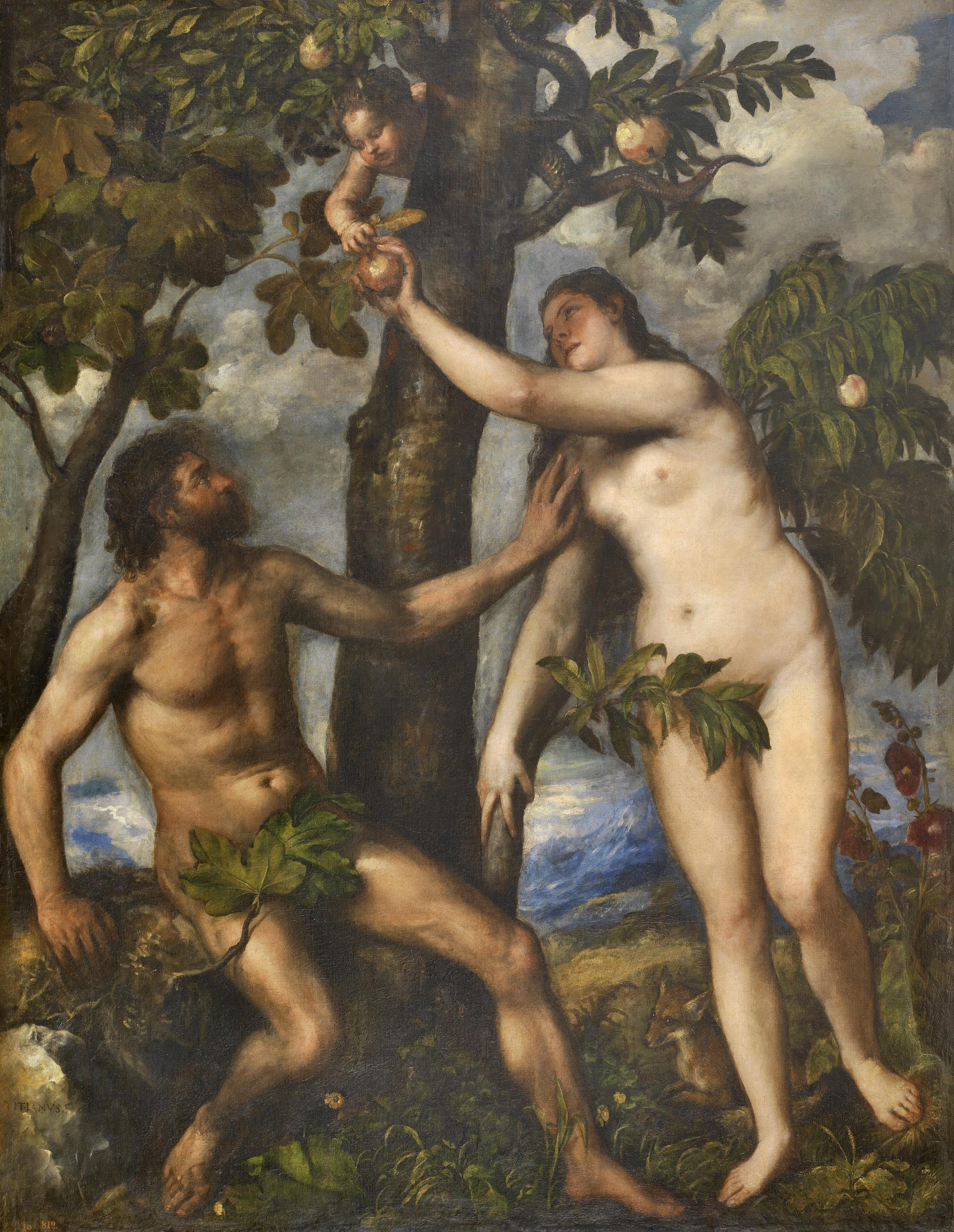
Adam and Eve by Titian, c. 1550

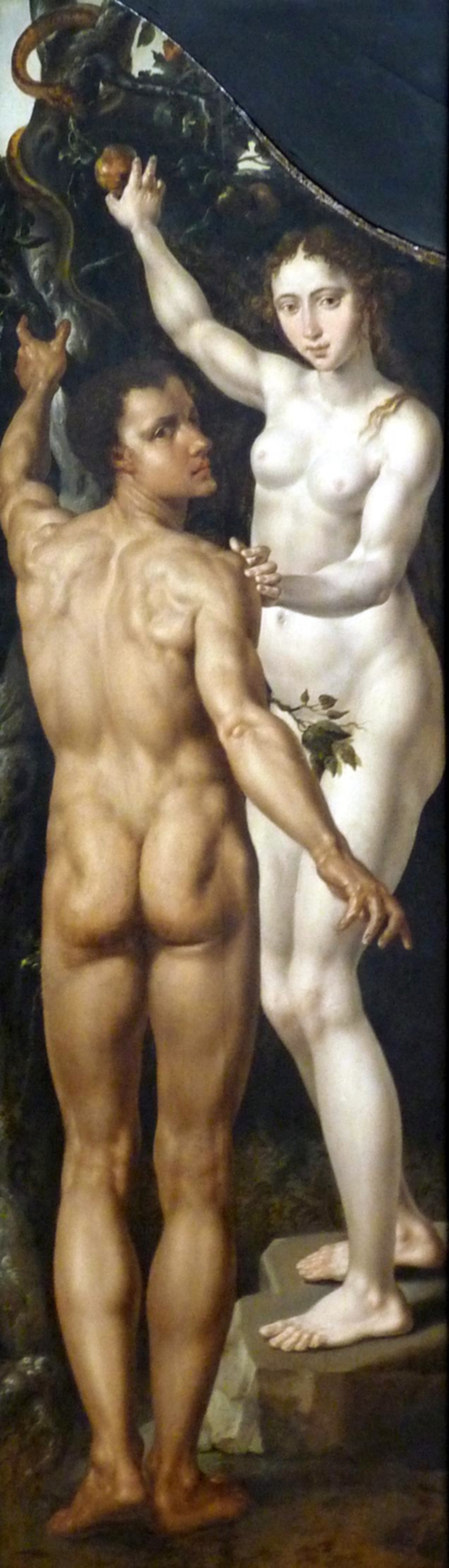
Adam and Eve by Maarten van Heemskerck, 1550

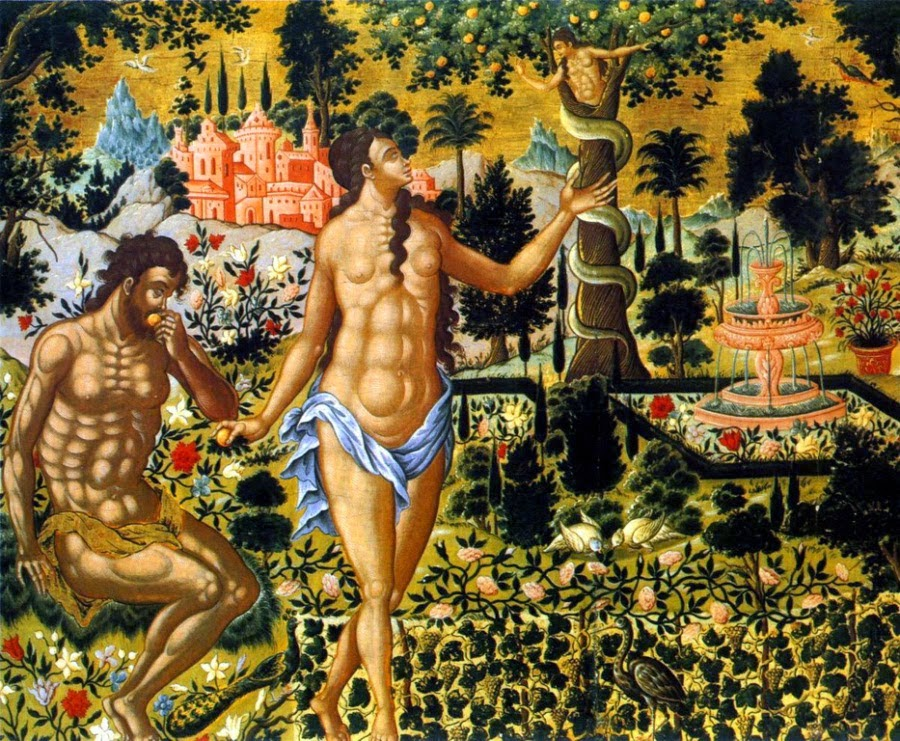
The Fall of Man by Theodore Poulakis, 1650 - 1692

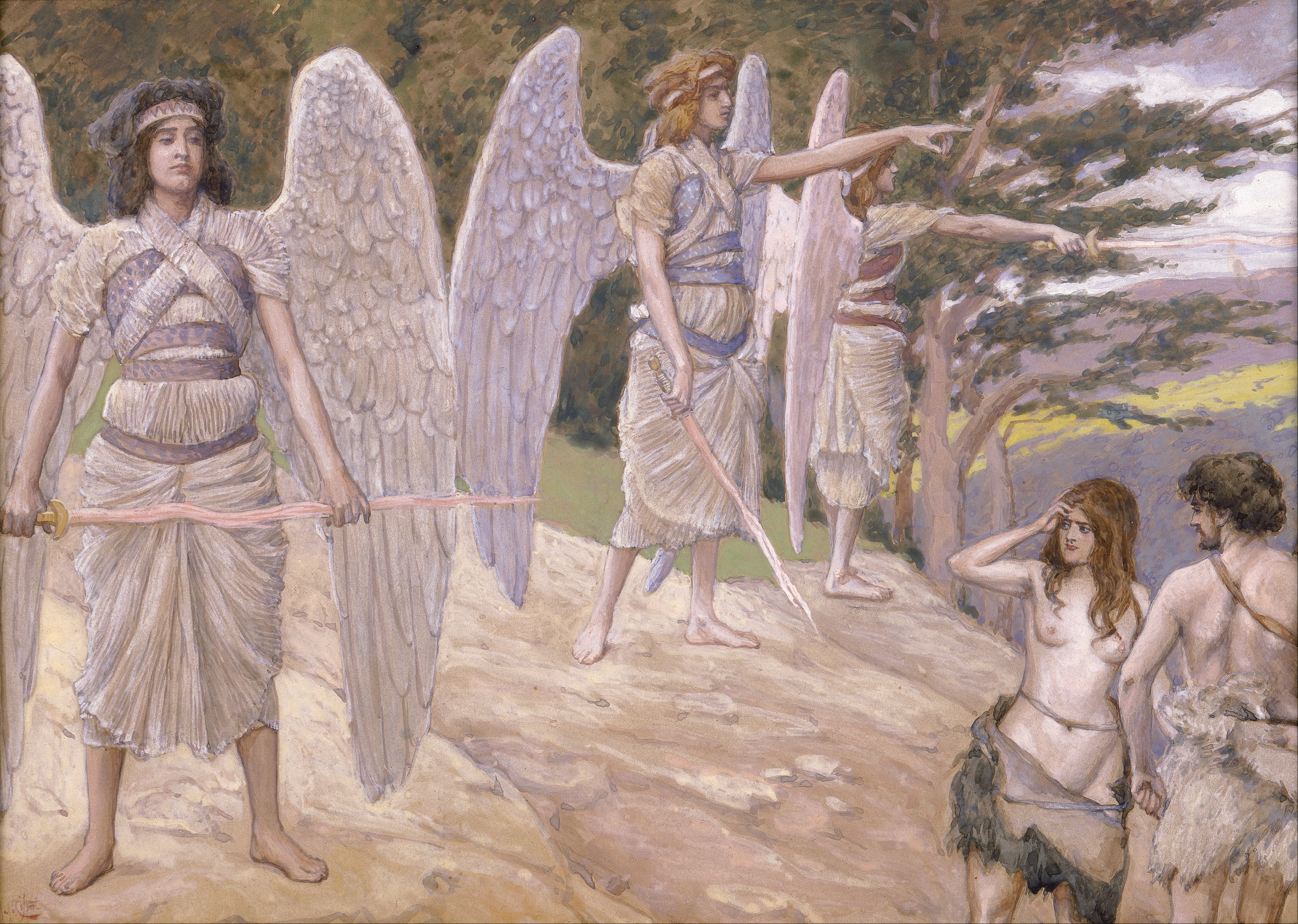
Adam and Eve Driven From Paradise by James Tissot, c. 1896-1902

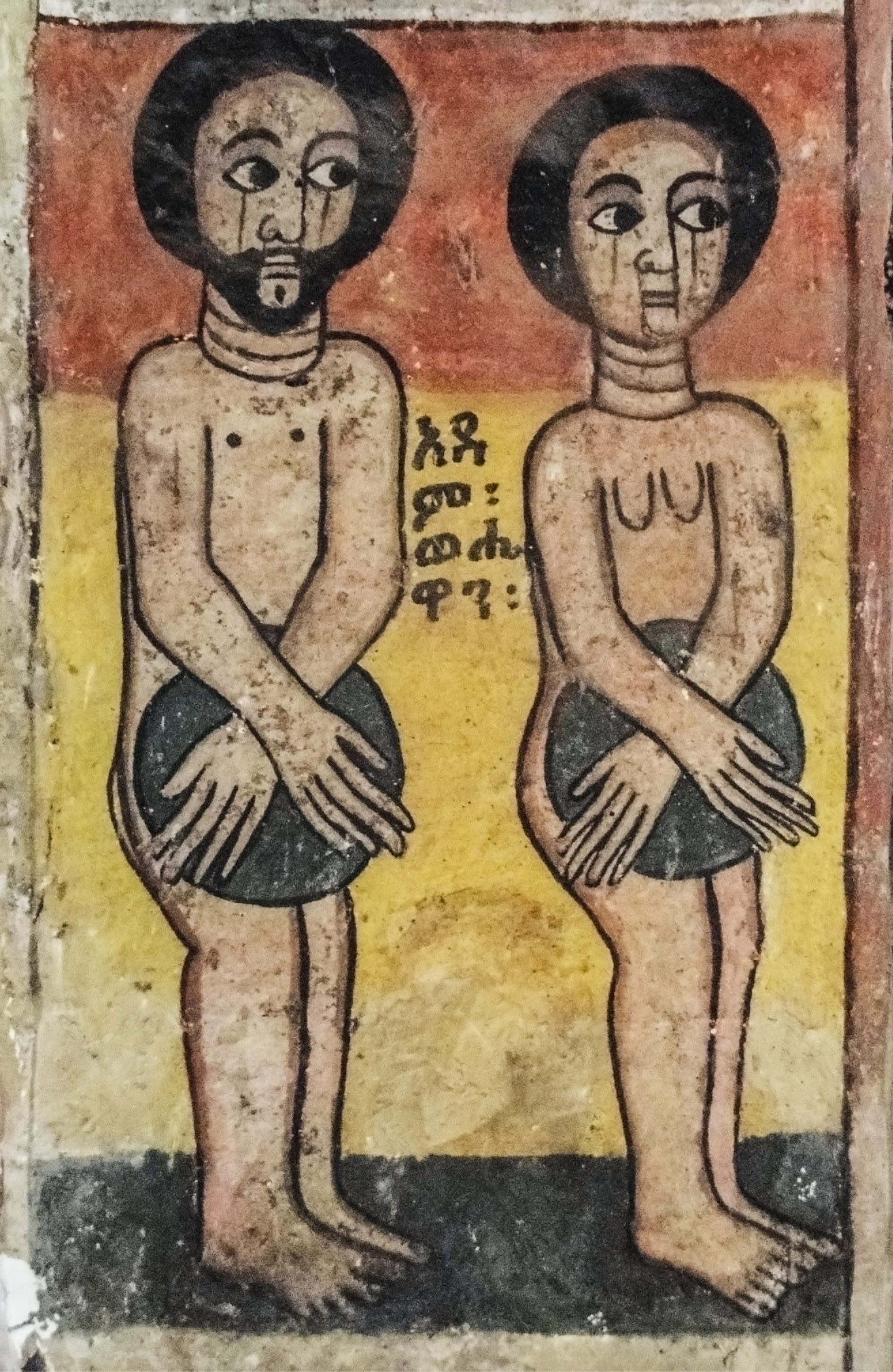
Adam and Eve depicted in a mural in Abreha wa Atsbeha Church, Ethiopia

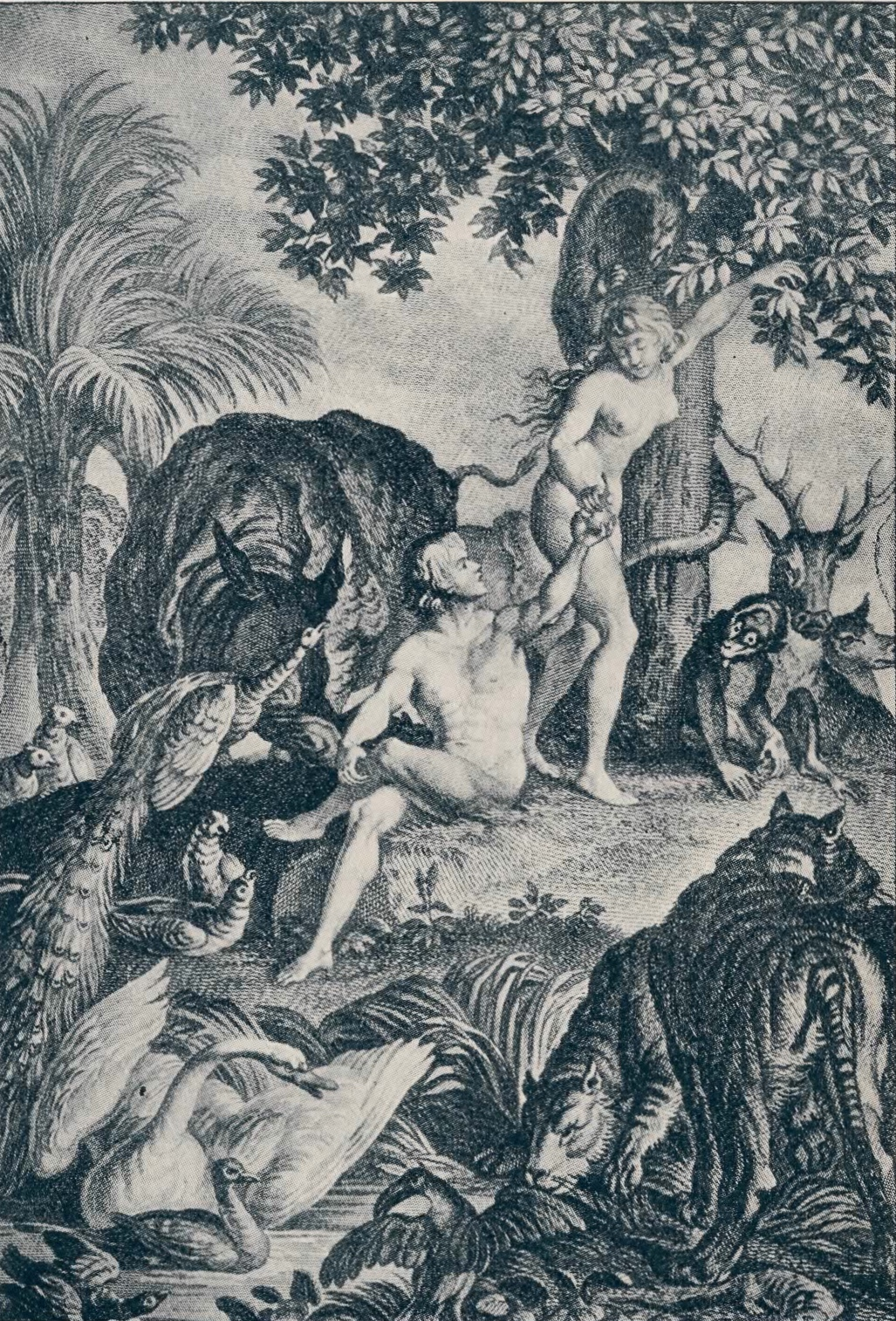
1896 illustration of Eve handing Adam the forbidden fruit

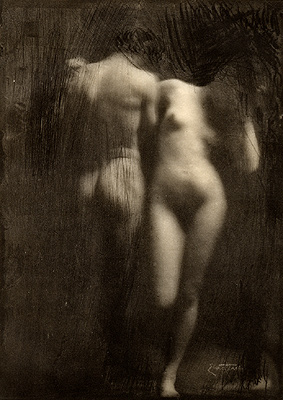
Adam and Eve by Frank Eugene, taken 1898, published in Camera Work no. 30, 1910

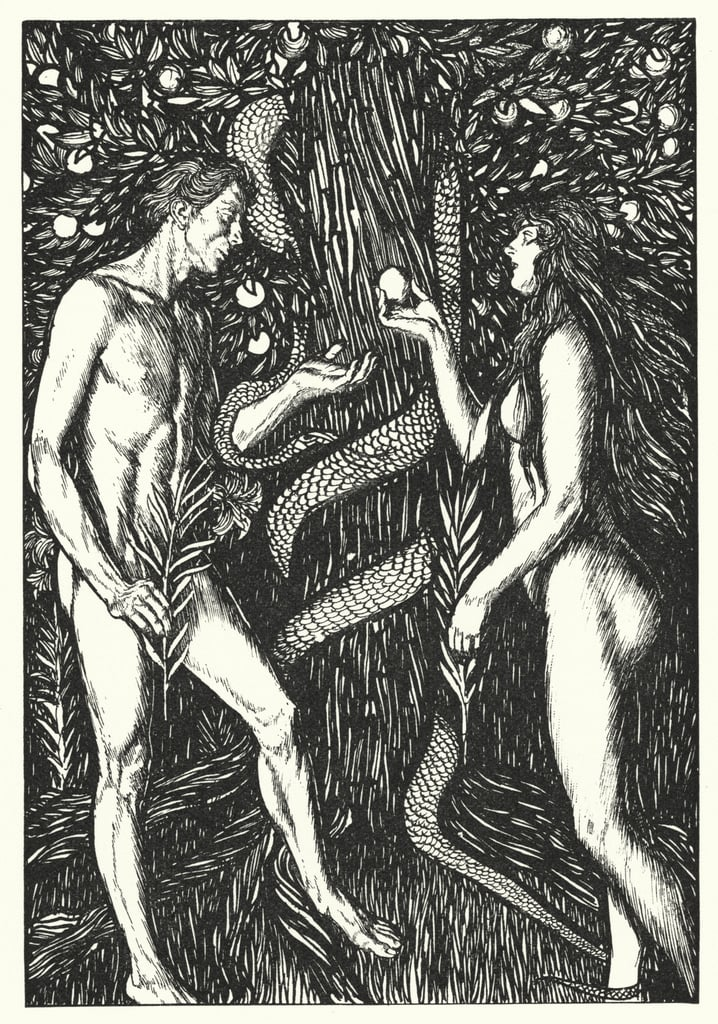
"The Old Adam and Eve" by E. J. Sullivan, 1898, for Sartor Resartus by Thomas Carlyle

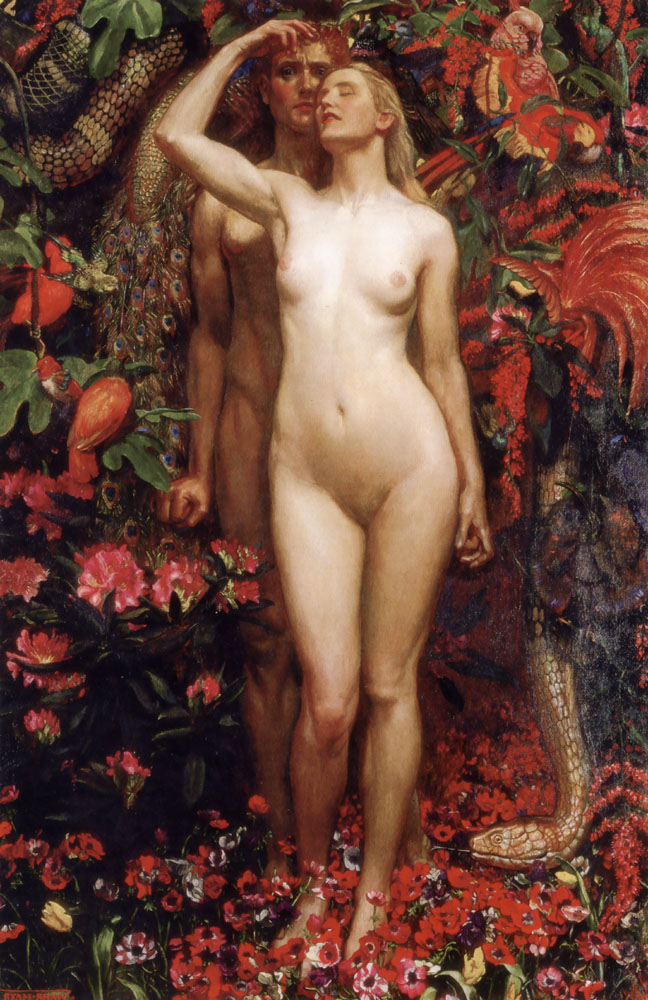
The Woman, the Man, and the Serpent by Byam Shaw, 1911

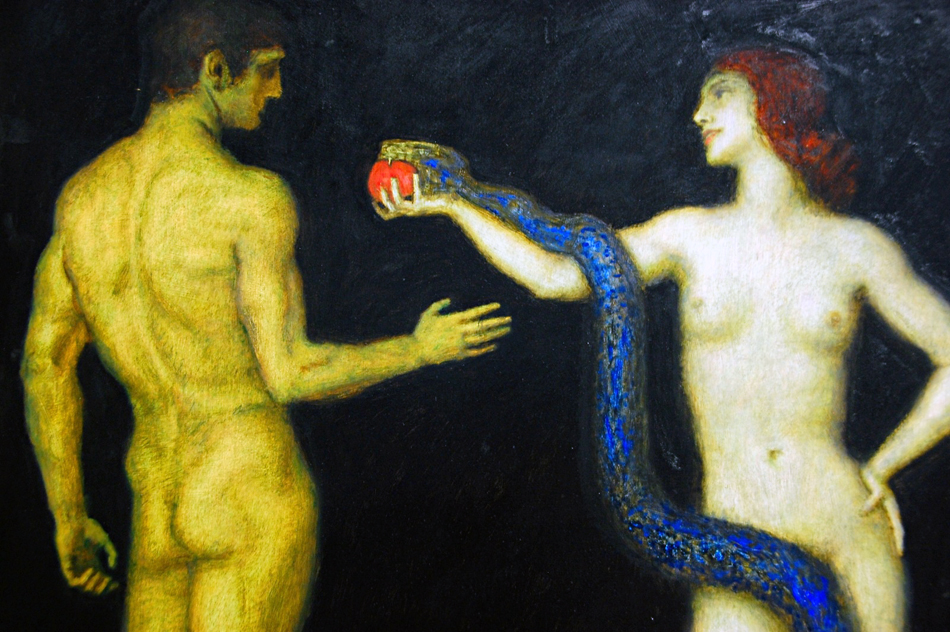
Adam and Eve by Franz Stuck, 1920

== See also ==
- Pre-Adamite
- Meta-historical fall
