= The Fall of Man (Rubens) =

Painting by Peter Paul Rubens

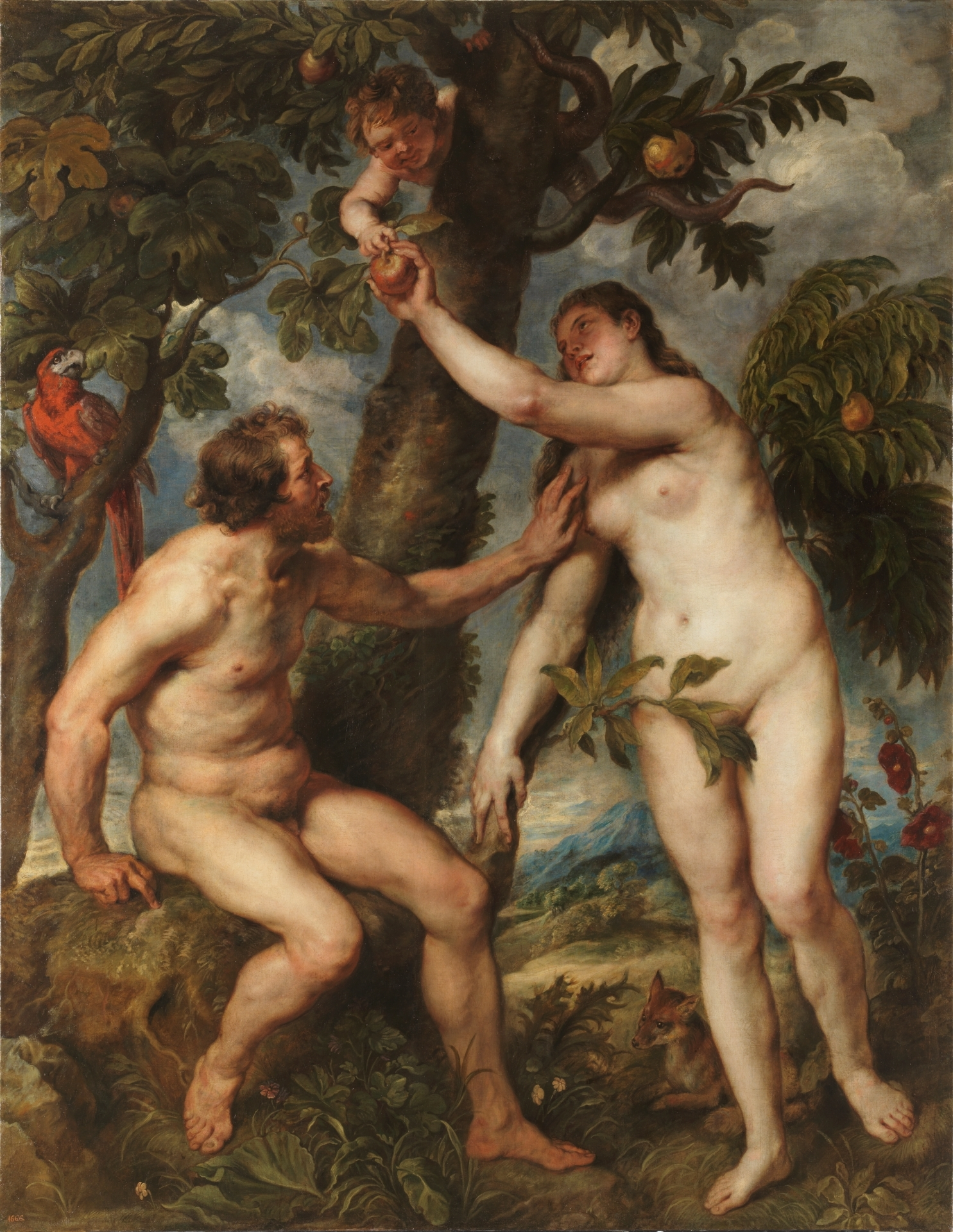
The Fall of Man (1628–1629) by Rubens

The Fall of Man, Adam and Eve or Adam and Eve in the earthly paradise is a 1628–1629 painting by Rubens, now in the Prado in Madrid. Once attributed to the minor Dutch artist Karel van Mander, it is now recognised as a work by Rubens.

It is a copy of the painting of the same subject by Titian, which Rubens saw during his 1628–1629 trip to Madrid for peace negotiations to end the Dutch Revolt. It reflects Raphael's influence on Titian and Jan Brueghel the Elder's influence on Rubens, who adds a parrot and changes Adam's posture, musculature, age and expression. Some researchers measured the impact of these changes on viewers' eye movements and concluded that viewers look more at Eve's face when viewing Rubens' version of the painting than when viewing Titian's version.

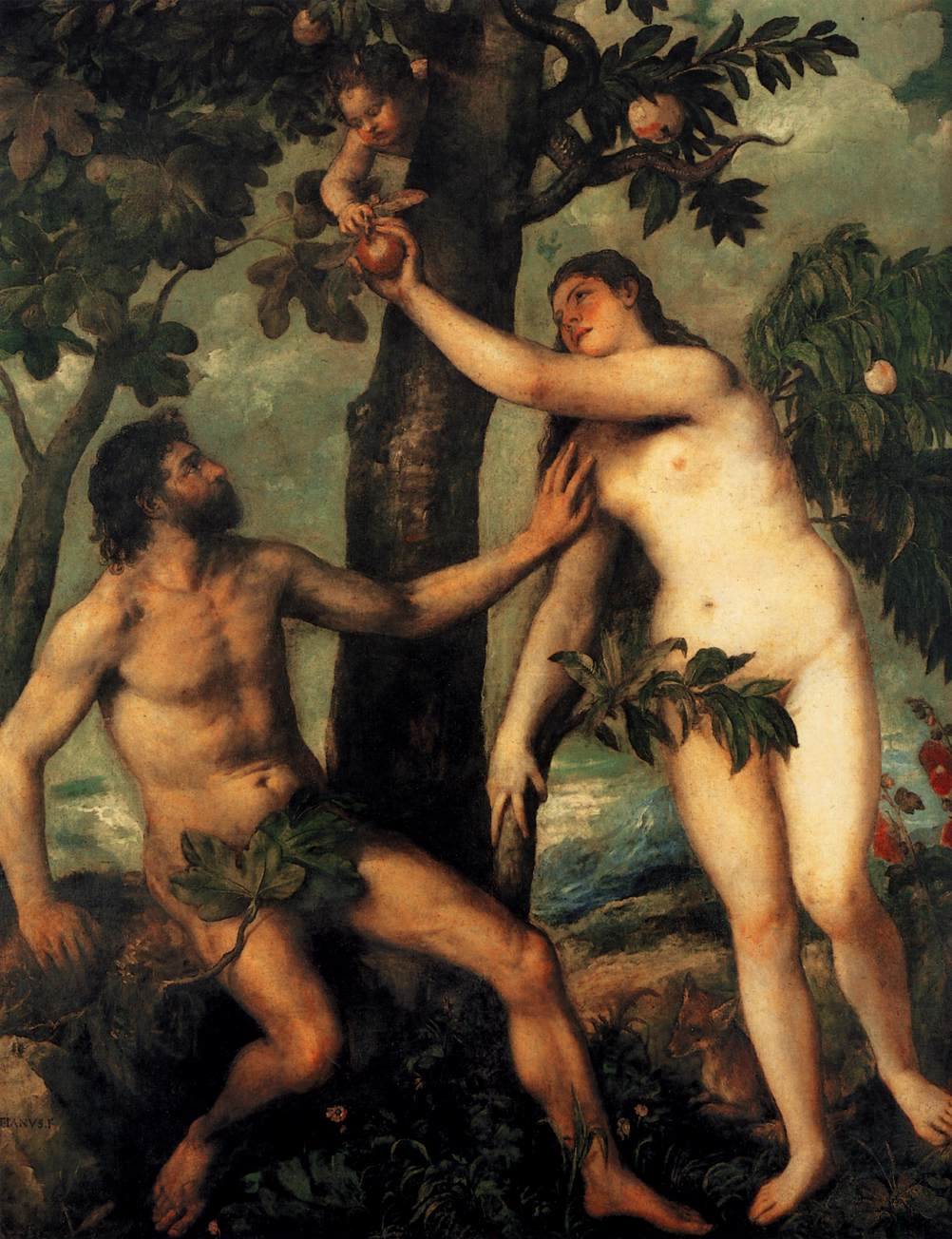
Version by Titian, c. 1550
