= Transportation in Williamsburg, Virginia =

The city of Williamsburg, Virginia has a full range of transport facilities. Williamsburg is served by the Newport News/Williamsburg International Airport, and by two larger but more distant airports. The city is linked to several Interstate and State highways. A transport hub - the Williamsburg Transportation Center - serves bus and rail passengers. Motor traffic is restricted in the historic area, and the city as a whole is more "walkable" than the US norm. Cycling routes are also being provided.

== Airports ==
Williamsburg is served by the Newport News/Williamsburg International Airport, in nearby Newport News, approximately 20 miles distant.

The Norfolk International Airport and Richmond International Airport, each located about 55 miles away via Interstate highways, are larger and offer considerably more flights. Williamsburg is roughly equidistant from these two airports. However, due to traffic concerns in crossing the harbor of Hampton Roads at the Hampton Roads Bridge-Tunnel, the Richmond airport is often a shorter driving time away.

The Williamsburg Jamestown Airport is a small general aviation airport located approximately 3 miles southwest of Williamsburg, that provides services for personal and charter aircraft, as well as related services (aviation goods, car rentals, etc.)

== Highways ==
Williamsburg is located adjacent to Interstate 64 and U.S. Route 60, which connect the city with Richmond to the northwest and Norfolk to the southeast. State Route 199, officially named the Humelsine Parkway (after former Colonial Williamsburg President Carl Humelsine), surrounds the city in a semicircle. State Route 5 links the city with the James River Plantations along the north shore of the James River, Interstate 295 and Richmond. State Route 31 links the city to Jamestown and the toll-free Jamestown Ferry.

The Colonial Parkway provides a bucolic low-speed link between the points of the Historic Triangle which in addition to Colonial Williamsburg, includes Jamestown and Yorktown. It passes under the colonial-era "Restored Area" in a tunnel. With the exception of buses, commercial vehicles are not allowed on the Parkway.

== Public land transport ==
Williamsburg Transportation Center is an intermodal facility located in a restored Chesapeake and Ohio Railway station located within walking distance of Colonial Williamsburg's Historic Area, the College of William and Mary, and the downtown area.

More comprehensively than many other U.S. destinations, Williamsburg offers good public transport alternatives for visitors and citizens, both getting there, and moving around locally. The area has both a central intermodal transportation center and an extensive public transit bus system prepared to serve local users and visitors.

=== Transportation center ===
The centrally located Williamsburg Transportation Center is located near the Historic Area, the College of William and Mary, and the downtown area. Nearly all intercity and local rail and bus services use this Center. It is located in a restored building which was formerly a Chesapeake and Ohio Railway station, and affords easy access to the Colonial Williamsburg Visitor Center.

=== Railroad ===
The city is served by several Amtrak trains a day, with direct service to Newport News, along the Virginia Peninsula to Richmond, and points along the Northeast Corridor from Washington DC through New York City to Boston.

A high-speed rail connection at Richmond to both the Northeast Corridor and the Southeast High Speed Rail Corridor are also under study.

=== Long-distance bus ===
Intercity bus service is provided by Greyhound Lines (Carolina Trailways) and Hampton Roads Transit (HRT).

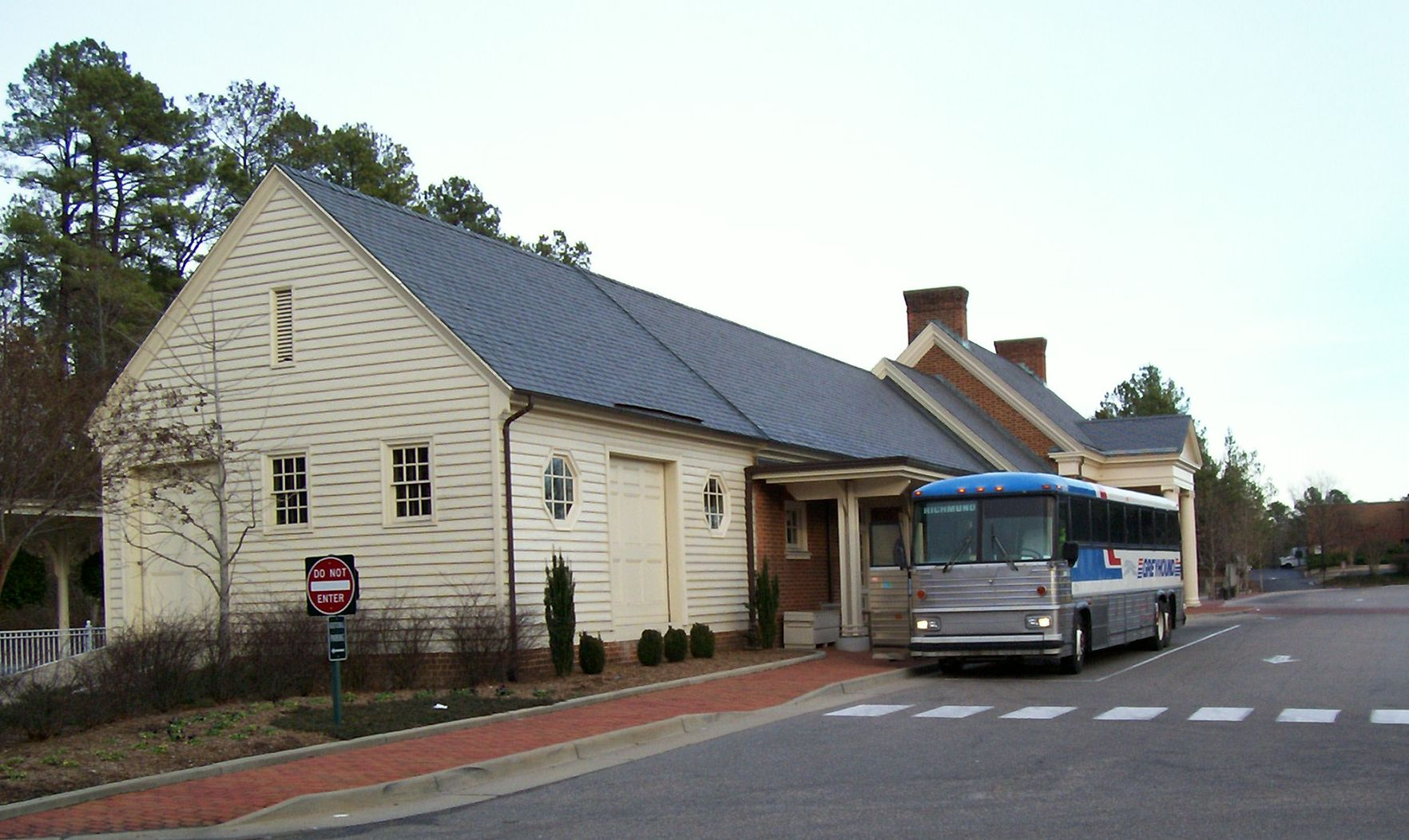
Greyhound bus loading at Williamsburg's Transportation Center. The intermodal services of trains, intercity buses, transit buses, taxicabs and rental cars offers exceptionally easy access to visitors

=== Local bus ===
The Transportation Center offers several modes of local transportation. Taxicabs and rental cars are also based there.

The community's public bus system, Williamsburg Area Transit Authority (WATA), has its central hub at the transportation center. A network of accessible transit bus routes serve the city, James City County, and most portions of York County adjacent to the Williamsburg area, with hourly service seven days a week, and half-hourly service on weekdays during peak travel hours. The routes operated by WATA include a loop around the College of William and Mary campus while classes are in session. The system also provides paratransit services and operates replica trolley buses at the Yorktown Riverfront attraction. WATA connects with the much larger Hampton Roads Transit (HRT) (Routes 108 and 116) bus system at Lee Hall in northwestern Newport News and at the Williamsburg Transportation Center (HRT Route 121). HRT routes connect to many other cities to the east in Hampton Roads and Greyhound Lines bus routes serve a nationwide network.

A local bus company, Oleta Coach Lines, Inc., operates a weekly public bus route from the Williamsburg Transportation Center to several large shopping malls in the Hampton Roads area. The bus route runs from Williamsburg to Hampton, to Newport News then back to Williamsburg. This has been certified as a Public Convenience and Necessity bus route.

== Walking and cycling ==
Walking is a major mode of transportation in Williamsburg, with about a fifth of people walking to work between 2006 and 2010. Walk Score, a website which algorithmically determines how friendly communities are to walkers, describes the city as "very walkable".

With few exceptions, motorized traffic is not allowed on Duke of Gloucester Street, which passes through Colonial Williamsburg and the shopping district of Merchant's Square. There are bus stops and some parking areas located conveniently nearby, however.

The city is also increasingly bicycle-friendly, having built 48 miles of bicycle facilities in the area since 1992. Upon completion, the Virginia Capital Trail will provide a paved off-road path to Richmond for cyclists and pedestrians via the Colonial Parkway.
