= Oakland, Virginia =

Oakland may refer to:

- Oakland, Henrico County, Virginia, on Virginia State Route 5
- Oakland, Richmond County, Virginia, now known as Mulch
