= Scotland, Virginia =

Scotland
- Census-designated place (CDP)
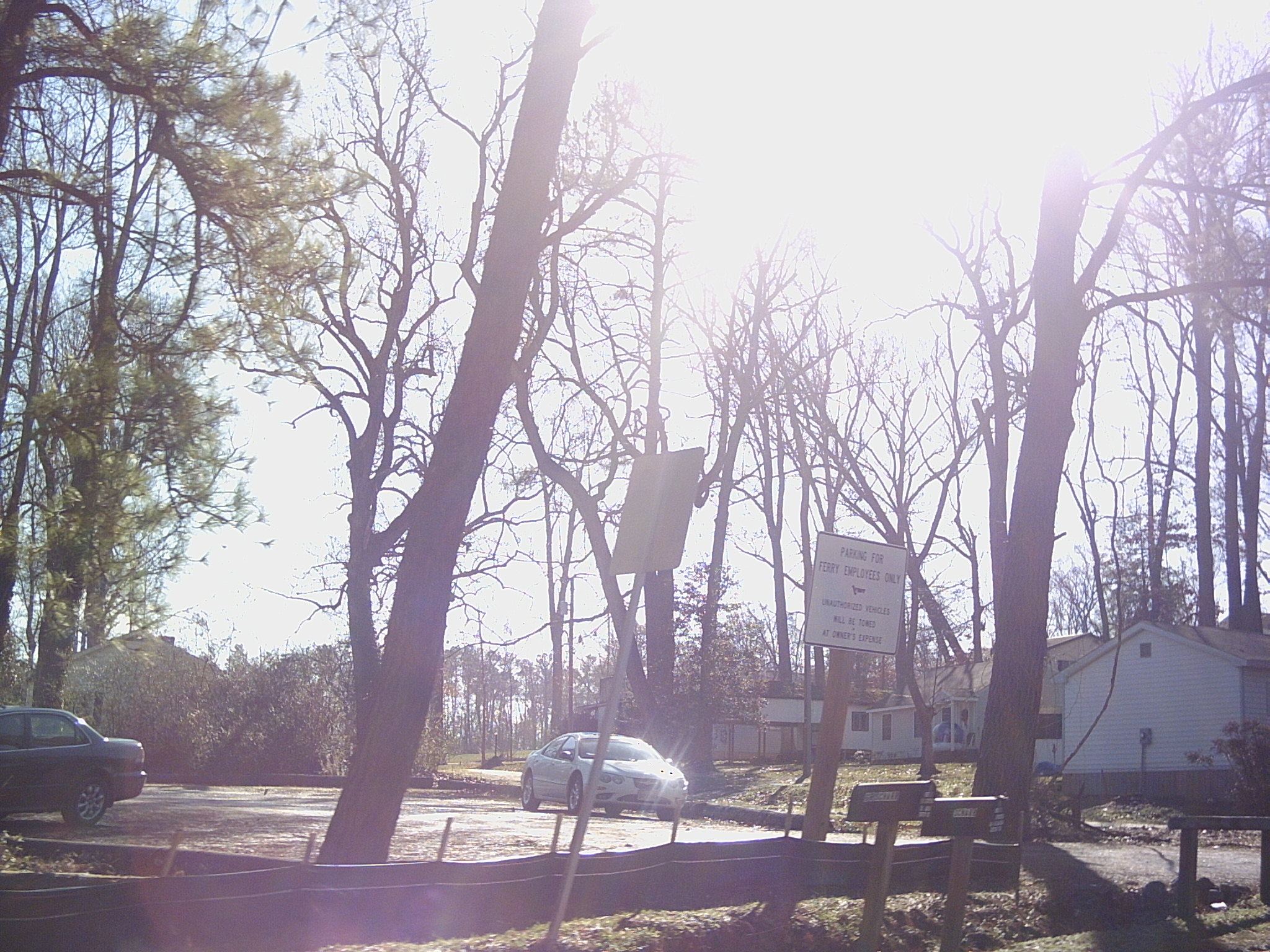

- Location within the state of Virginia
- Coordinates: 37°10′59″N 76°52′43″W
- Country: United States
- State: Virginia
- County: Surry

Population (2010)
  - Total: 203
- Time zone: UTC−5 (Eastern (EST))
  - Summer (DST): UTC−4 (EDT)

Scotland also known as Scotland Wharf is a census-designated place (CDP) in Surry County, Virginia, United States. As of the 2020 census, Scotland had a population of 153. Located on State Route 31 (the John Rolfe Highway), Scotland is the southern terminus and headquarters of the Jamestown Scotland Ferry, a crossing service of the James River operated by the Virginia Department of Transportation (VDOT).

Visitors approaching from the south to Virginia's Historic Triangle may use the ferry service via Scotland. Replicas of the Susan Constant, Godspeed, and Discovery are docked near the northern ferry terminus at Glasshouse Point in James City County and can be seen from the ferry.

Scotland was at one time the terminal of a narrow-gauge railroad from Dendron.

Pleasant Point and Swann's Point Plantation Site are listed on the National Register of Historic Places.

== Demographics ==
Historical population
Census	Pop.	Note	%±
2010	203		—
2020	153		−24.6%
U.S. Decennial Census; 2010 2020

Scotland was first listed as a census designated place in the 2010 U.S. census.

=== Racial and ethnic composition ===
Scotland CDP, Virginia – Racial and ethnic composition Note: the US Census treats Hispanic/Latino as an ethnic category. This table excludes Latinos from the racial categories and assigns them to a separate category. Hispanics/Latinos may be of any race.
Race / Ethnicity (NH = Non-Hispanic)	Pop 2010	Pop 2020	% 2010	% 2020
White alone (NH)	130	114	64.04%	74.51%
Black or African American alone (NH)	68	29	33.50%	18.95%
Native American or Alaska Native alone (NH)	0	1	0.00%	0.65%
Asian alone (NH)	0	0	0.00%	0.00%
Native Hawaiian or Pacific Islander alone (NH)	0	1	0.00%	0.65%
Other race alone (NH)	0	0	0.00%	0.00%
Mixed race or Multiracial (NH)	4	4	1.97%	2.61%
Hispanic or Latino (any race)	1	4	0.49%	2.61%
Total	203	153	100.00%	100.00%

== See also ==
- Colonial Parkway
- Colonial Williamsburg
- Jamestown 2007
