= Virginia State Route 132 =

State highway in eastern Virginia, US

State Route 132

Route information
- Maintained by VDOT
- Length: 4.09 mi (6.58 km)
- Existed: mid-1950s–present

Major junctions
- South end: SR 199 / SR 1201 in Williamsburg
- SR 5 in Williamsburg; US 60 near Williamsburg
- North end: SR 143 near Williamsburg

Location
- Country: United States
- State: Virginia
- Counties: City of Williamsburg, York

Highway system
- Virginia Routes; Interstate; US; Primary; Secondary; Byways; History; HOT lanes
← SR 131	→ SR 133

State Route 132 (SR 132) is a primary state highway in the U.S. state of Virginia. Known for most of its length as Henry Street, the state highway runs 4.09 miles (6.58 km) from SR 199 in Williamsburg north to SR 143 in York County near Williamsburg. SR 132 is the main north–south highway through the independent city of Williamsburg. The state highway is also, via SR 143, the primary access road to Colonial Williamsburg, The College of William & Mary, and Colonial Parkway from Interstate 64 (I-64).

== Route description ==
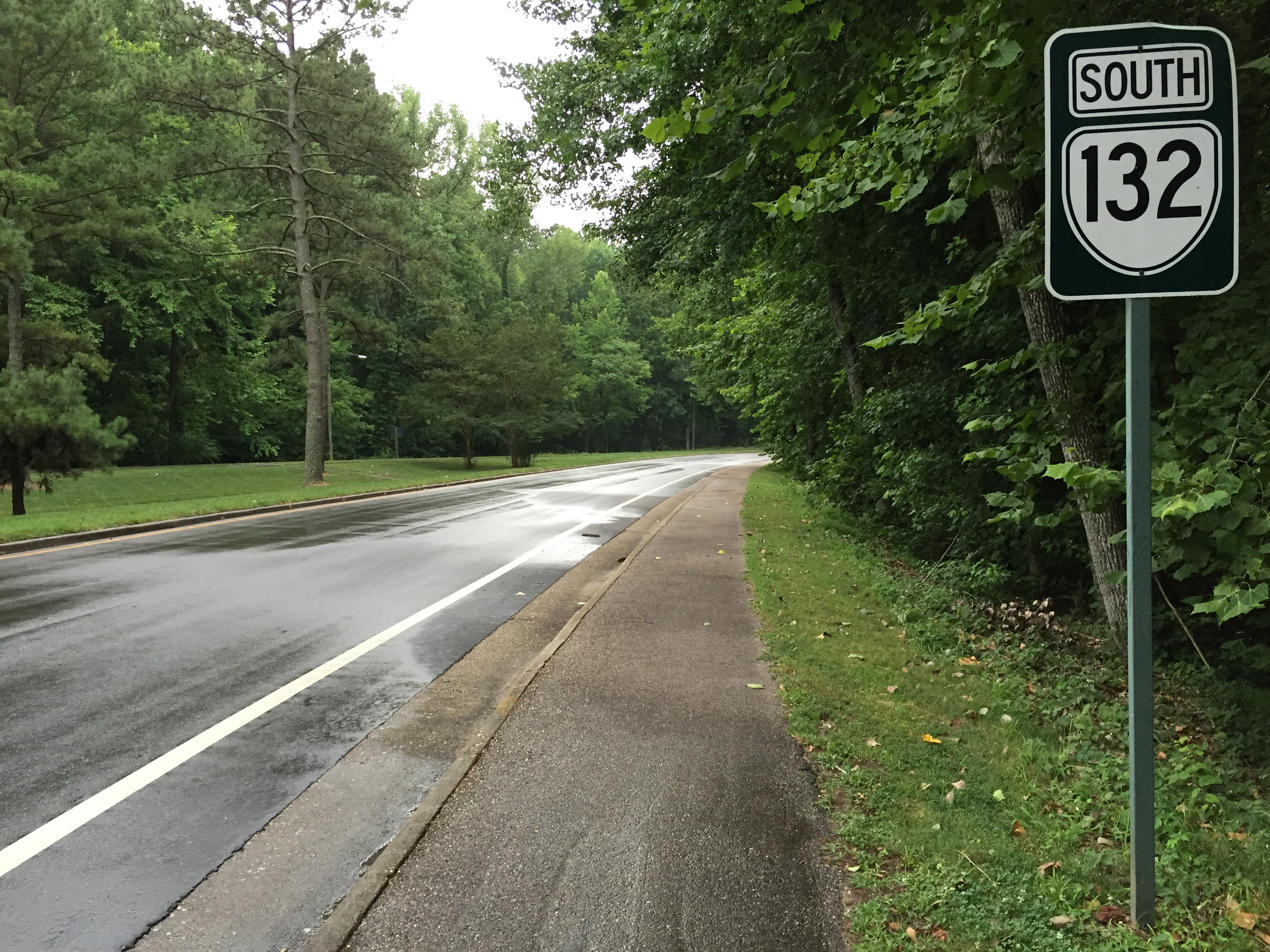
View south along SR 132 at SR 132Y in Williamsburg

SR 132 begins at an intersection with SR 199 (Humelsine Parkway) at the southern edge of the city of Williamsburg. The intersection is just west of SR 199's interchange with Colonial Parkway, which is unsigned SR 90003. SR 132 also has a connection with the parkway just north of the SR 199 intersection. The state highway heads north as two-lane undivided Henry Street, which crosses Paper Mill Creek and passes through a forested area before reaching the southern edge of downtown Williamsburg, where the highway passes the William & Mary School of Law and the National Center for State Courts. North of the DeWitt Wallace Decorative Arts Museum, SR 132 intersects SR 5 (Francis Street). The two highways run concurrently north between Colonial Williamsburg to the east and both the modern downtown of Williamsburg and the College of William & Mary to the west. SR 132 and SR 5 have a junction with Duke of Gloucester Street, once the main east–west street of the city but is now a pedestrian street through Colonial Williamsburg.

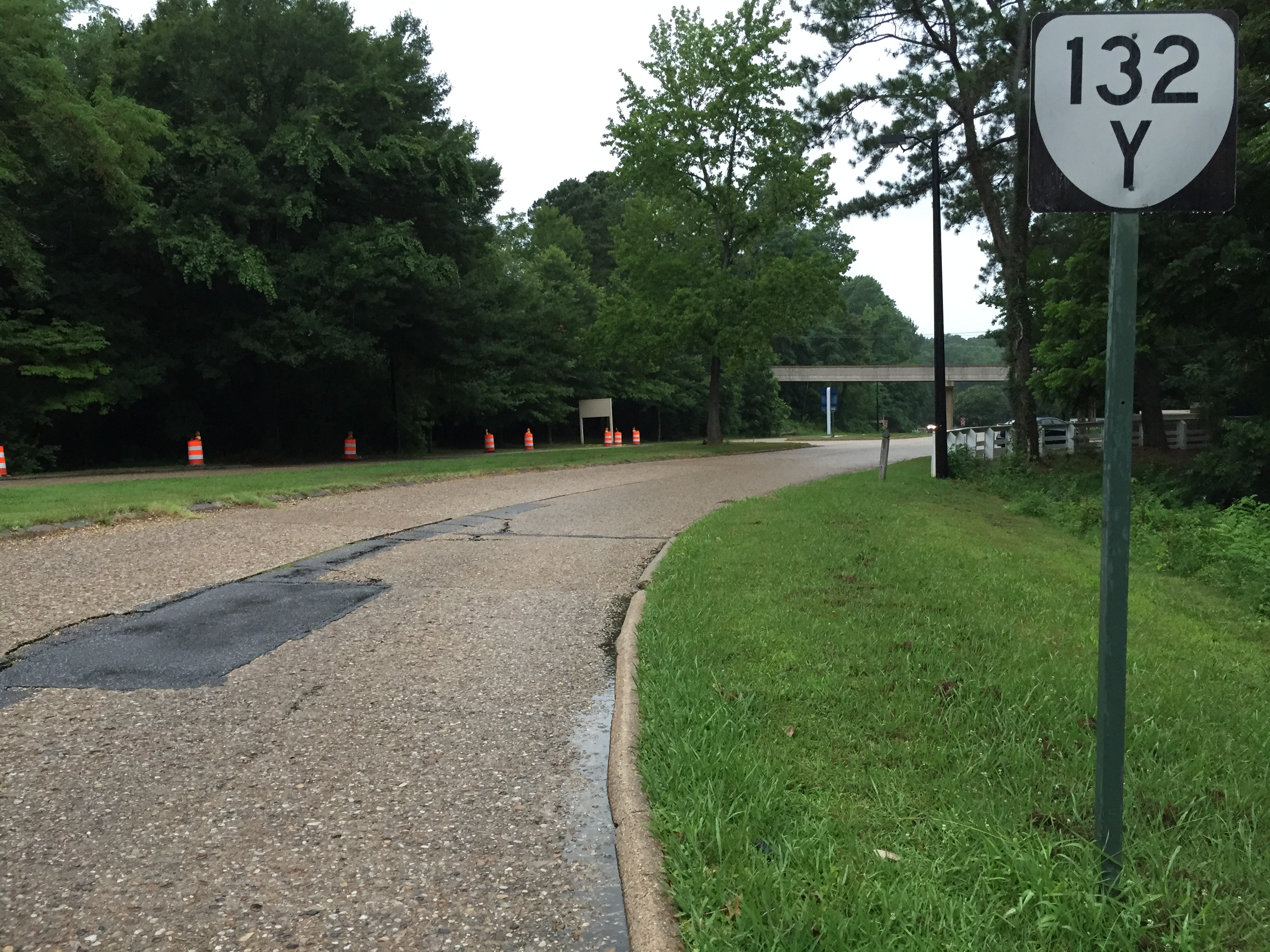
View north along SR 132Y at Colonial Parkway in Williamsburg

At the north end of downtown Williamsburg, just east of the Williamsburg Transportation Center serving Amtrak's Northeast Regional train, SR 132 intersects Lafayette Street, onto which SR 5 heads east. After the state highway's at-grade intersection with CSX's Peninsula Subdivision, Henry Street splits to the north as an unnumbered city street and SR 132 veers northeast through a forested area. The state highway intersects SR 132Y at a directional intersection. SR 132Y is a 0.29-mile (0.47 km) spur that connects SR 132 with the Colonial Williamsburg Visitors Center and with Colonial Parkway. SR 132 expands to a four-lane divided highway at the SR 132Y junction, crosses the boundary between the city of Williamsburg and York County and has an intersection with U.S. Route 60 (Bypass Road) before reducing to a two-lane undivided road. The state highway crosses Queen Creek before reaching its northern terminus at SR 143 (Merrimac Trail), which provides access to I-64.

== Major intersections ==
County	Location	mi	km	Destinations	Notes
James City	Kingspoint	0.00	0.00	SR 199 / SR 1201 (Kingspoint Drive) to I-64 / Colonial Parkway – Yorktown, Jamestown, Busch Gardens	Southern terminus
City of Williamsburg		1.85	2.98	SR 5 west (Francis Street) – Busch Gardens	South end of concurrency with SR 5
City of Williamsburg		2.23	3.59	SR 5 east (Lafayette Street)	North end of concurrency with SR 5; former SR 162
City of Williamsburg		2.67	4.30	SR 132Y east (Visitor Center Drive) – Yorktown, Jamestown, Colonial Williamsburg Visitor Center, Colonial Parkway	
York		2.93	4.72	US 60 (Bypass Road) / to Richmond Road – Busch Gardens	
York		4.09	6.58	SR 143 (Capitol Landing Road) to I-64 – Newport News, Richmond, Williamsburg	Northern terminus
1.000 mi = 1.609 km; 1.000 km = 0.621 mi: Concurrency terminus
