= Lake Powell (disambiguation) =

Lake Powell is a major reservoir in the southwestern United States. Lake Powell may also refer to:

- Lake Powell, Victoria, a locality in Australia
- Lake Powell (Virginia), a pond in James City County, Virginia
- Powell Lake, a waterbody in British Columbia, Canada
