= VA5 =

VA-5 has the following meanings:

- State Route 5 (Virginia)
- Virginia's 5th congressional district
