= Historic Triangle =

District in United States

Coordinates: 37°15′N 76°39′W

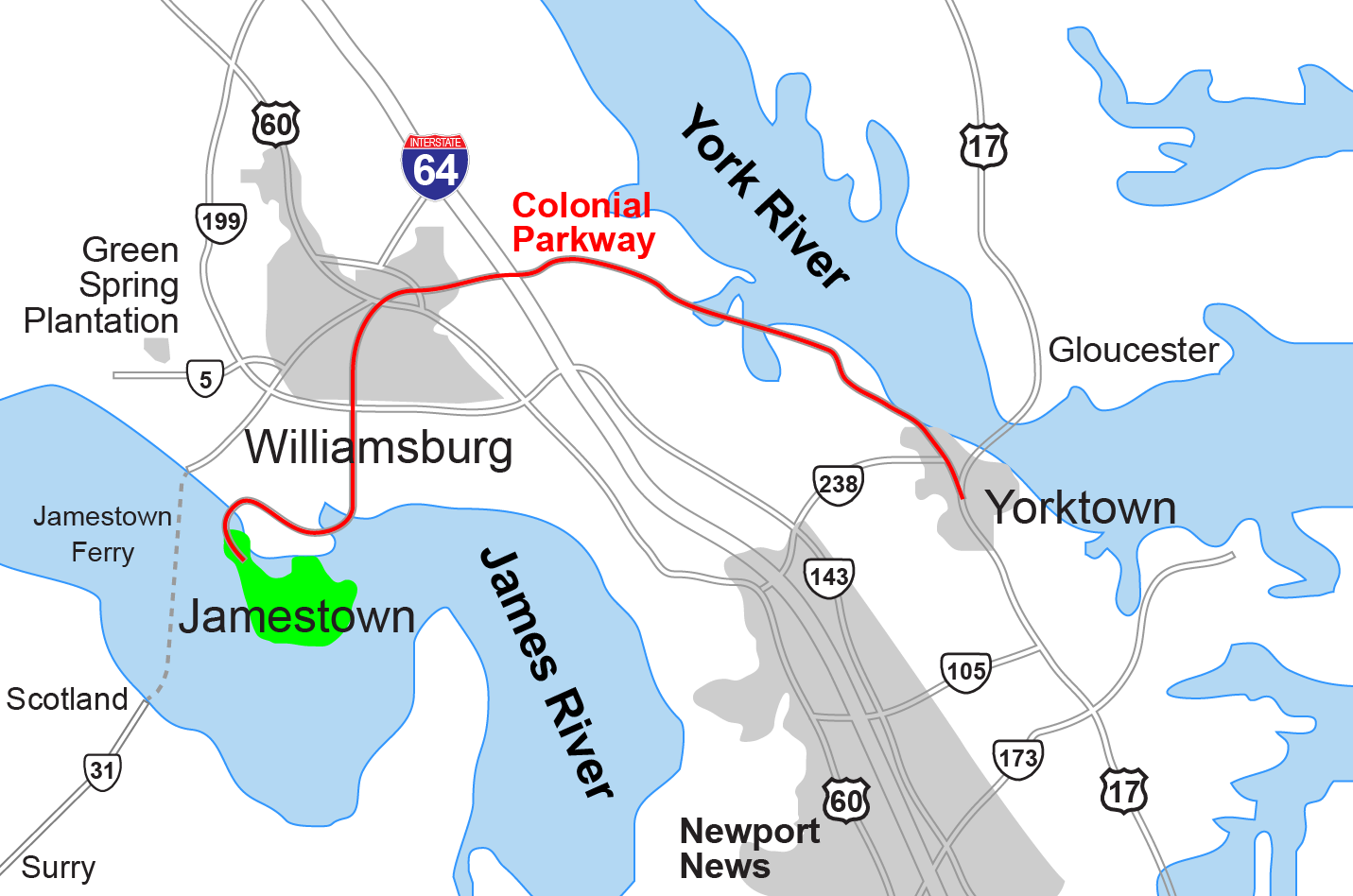
The three points of Colonial Virginia's Historic Triangle, Jamestown, Williamsburg, and Yorktown, which are linked by the scenic Colonial Parkway

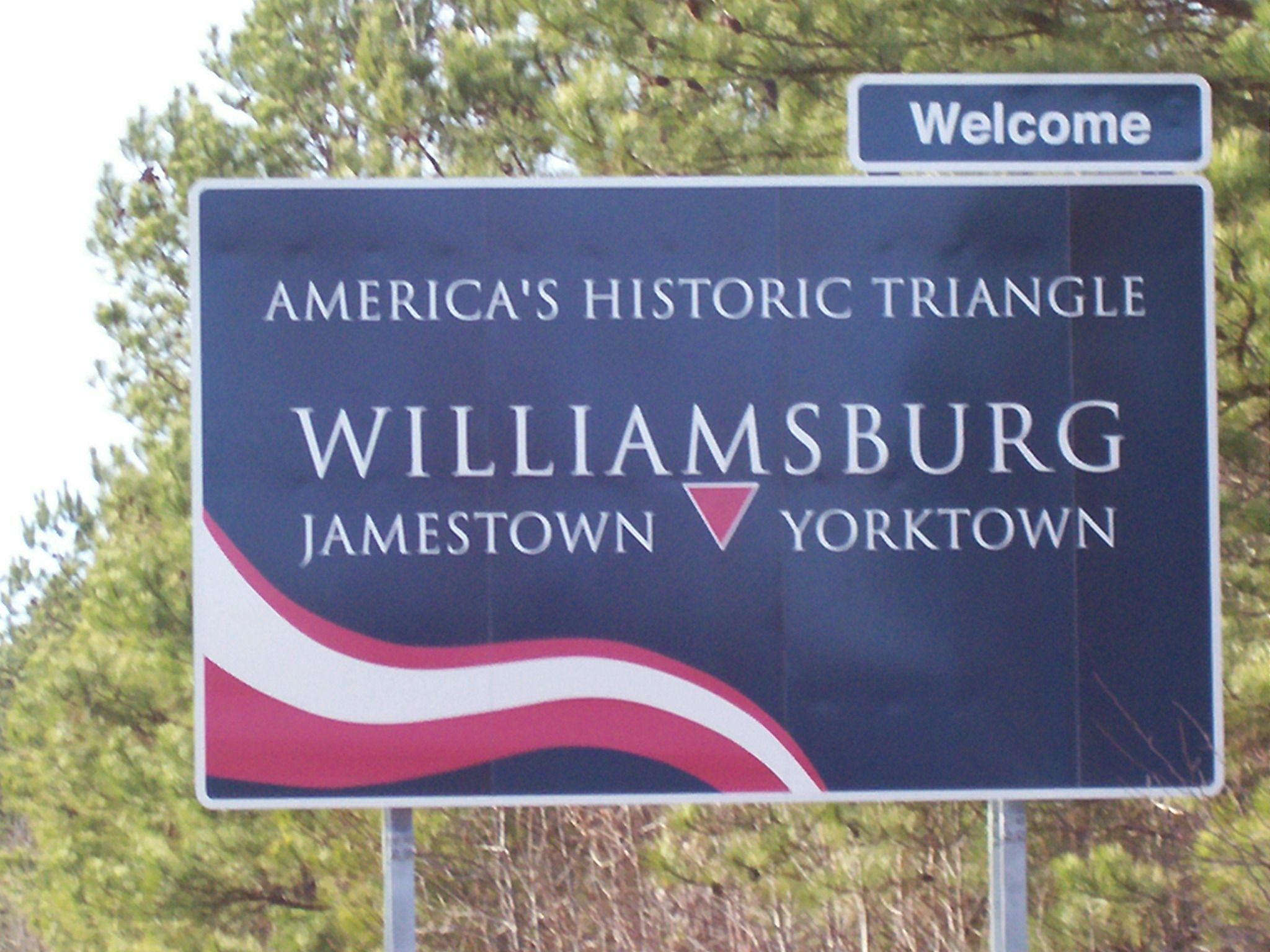
A sign for the Historic Triangle on U.S. Route 60 just west of Grove, Virginia near Busch Gardens Williamsburg theme park in James City County, Virginia

The Historic Triangle includes three historic colonial communities located on the Virginia Peninsula, bounded by the York River on the north and James River on the south. The three points that form the triangle are Jamestown, Colonial Williamsburg, and Yorktown. They feature many restored attractions and are linked by the Colonial Parkway in James City and York counties, and the City of Williamsburg.

Describing the significance to the United States of the three main points of the Historic Triangle, the Reverend Dr. W.A.R. Goodwin, rector of Bruton Parish Church and co-founder of Colonial Williamsburg, said, "Williamsburg is Jamestown continued, and Yorktown is Williamsburg vindicated."

== Colonial Parkway ==
The National Park Service's Colonial Parkway was constructed to connect the three historic attractions of Colonial Virginia with a scenic and bucolic roadway carefully shielded from views of commercial development. Intended to help visitors mentally return to the past, it has views of waterway and natural areas, and wildlife and waterfowl along the roadway (and crossing it). The only human development that can be seen from most of the parkway are the two loading piers of Cheatham Annex, part of the Naval Weapons Station Yorktown, which borders the inland side of much of the parkway. The peninsula has major military installations.

Near the James River and York River ends of the parkway, there are several pull-offs where visitors can admire the view. The Colonial Parkway is free of tolls or user fees.

The Parkway starts in Yorktown, passes through Colonial Williamsburg and ends in Jamestown. No commercial vehicles are allowed to use the parkway for transportation, although commuter traffic has increased dramatically in the early 21st century.

== Jamestown Ferry ==
Some visitors from the South travel to the area across the James River by ferry from Surry County. State Route 10 and State Route 31 (the John Rolfe Highway) lead to Scotland Wharf. Visitors can take one of the four Jamestown Ferries, which include the Pocahontas and Williamsburg. As passengers cross, they can leave their vehicles and can walk about or go up to an enclosed viewing level with restrooms.

During favorable weather and daylight hours, northbound passengers usually see the Jamestown Island much as the first colonists may have approached it. Replicas of Christopher Newport's three tiny ships, Susan Constant, Godspeed, and Discovery are docked near the northern ferry landing at Glass House Point.

The state-operated Jamestown Ferry service is toll-free.

== Jamestown ==
The first permanent English settlement in the New World was established at Jamestown on May 13, 1607. There are two major heritage sites at Jamestown: Jamestown Settlement, a living history museum which includes a reconstructed Native American village, colonial fort, and replica ships, operated by the Commonwealth of Virginia; and Historic Jamestowne, the National Park Service site which includes Jamestown Island and the ongoing archaeological projects.

== Williamsburg ==
In 1699, the capital of Virginia was moved from Jamestown to a location on high ground at Middle Plantation at the suggestion of students from the College of William and Mary, which had been established there in 1693. Middle Plantation was soon renamed Williamsburg, in honor of King William III, and it was a busy place until the American Revolution.

In 1780, during the American Revolutionary War, the capital and government were moved to a more secure location at Richmond. Williamsburg became a largely sleepy little town for almost 150 years, as many young people left the Tidewater area in search of new lands to the west and other frontiers. In the early 20th century, the town was revived due to the preservation efforts of Reverend Dr. W.A.R. Goodwin, rector of Bruton Parish Church, and the generosity of Standard Oil heir John D. Rockefeller Jr. and his family, who shared a dream of restoring the old colonial capital city to its 18th-century state. They worked for decades to develop that vision to honor the later colonial capital.

The result of those efforts, Colonial Williamsburg, is a large living museum of early American life. It has 88 original buildings and dozens of restored and recreated buildings and re-enactors. It is one of the most popular tourist destinations in the world. The Visitor Center (right off the Colonial Parkway) features a short movie. It has a parking area, as automobiles are restricted from the restored area. A wheelchair-accessible shuttle bus service is provided.

== Yorktown ==
The third point of the triangle is Yorktown, where General Cornwallis surrendered to George Washington in 1781 in the last land battle of the American Revolution. There are two large visitor centers, battlefield drives, and a waterfront area. The historic area of downtown has numerous buildings from the pre-Revolutionary era.

== Commercial enterprises ==
The three Historic Triangle areas (and the Colonial Parkway between them) have been restored to promote a sense of the past. Nearby are many modern hotels, motels, campgrounds, restaurants, shops and stores, gasoline stations, and amusements.

Other major attractions include:

- Busch Gardens, a theme park located near in James City County
- Go-Karts Plus, a theme park located near Williamsburg in James City County next to the Williamsburg Pottery Factory on U.S. Route 60
- Water Country USA, a water park located near Williamsburg in York County
- The Williamsburg Winery, Virginia's largest winery located on a 320-acre (1.3 km^{2}) farm in historical Williamsburg
- Williamsburg Pottery Factory, located on U.S. Route 60 a few miles west of Williamsburg in James City County

== See also ==
- Hampton Roads
- American Revolution Museum at Yorktown
