= Williamsburg Pottery Factory =

Outlet store in Virginia, US

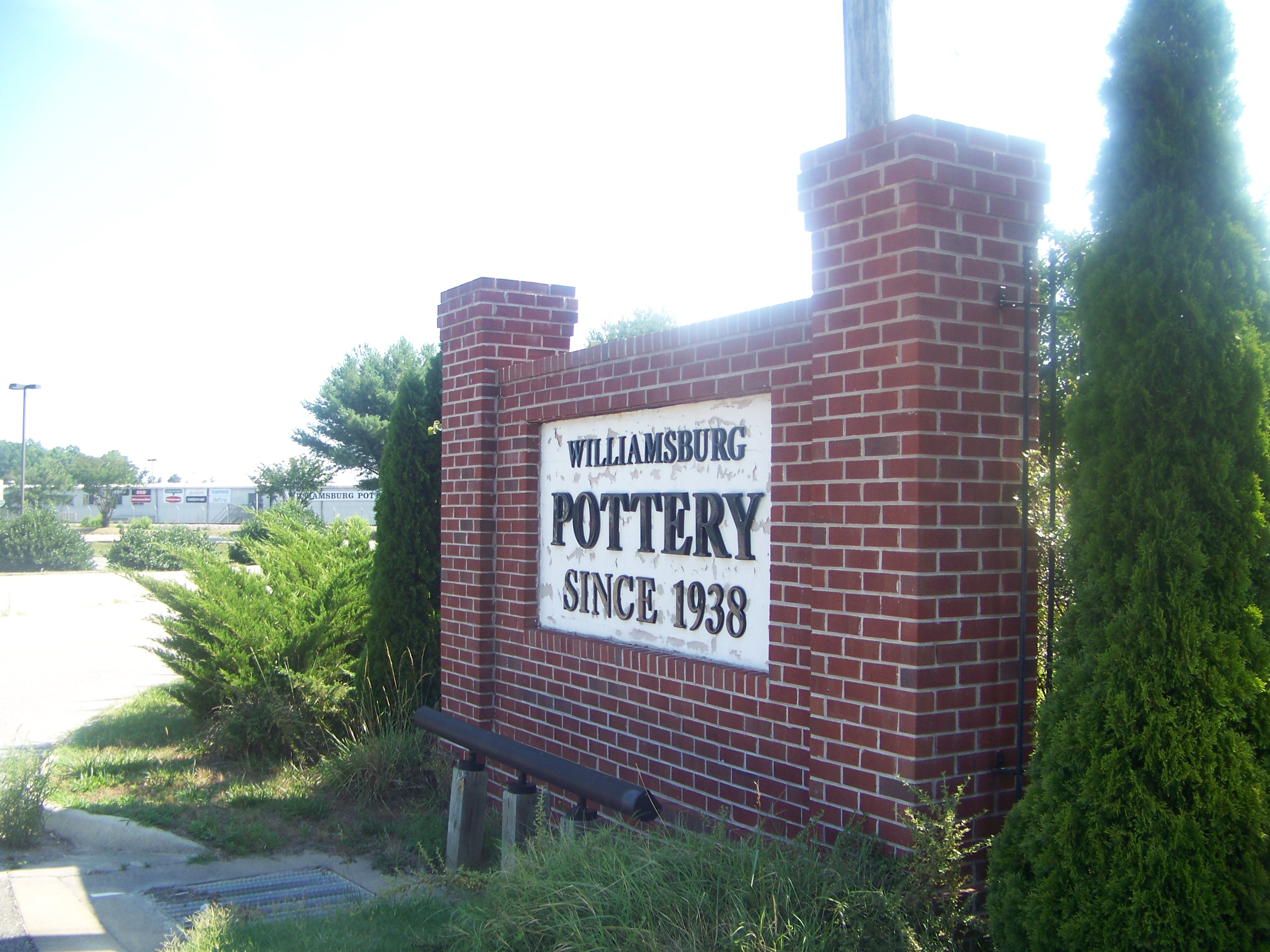
Old sign for the original Williamsburg Pottery Factory (2007)

Williamsburg Pottery Factory is a large, multi-structure retail outlet store located in Lightfoot, Virginia, about 6 miles (9.7 km) west of Williamsburg. It was founded in 1938 by James E. Maloney as a small pottery workshop. The Williamsburg Pottery Factory now markets itself as one of Virginia's largest tourist attractions. Referred to by the locals as "the Pottery", the 200-acre (0.81 km^{2}) attraction offers a selection of locally handmade articles, as well as imports from 20 countries. Once famous for its straightforward appearance; the Pottery Factory received a multimillion-dollar redevelopment substantially upgrading its approach.

== History ==
In 1938, James E. Maloney founded Williamsburg Pottery, located near Colonial Williamsburg, making eighteenth-century salt glaze reproductions to sell at low prices. He purchased a half-acre property for $150 and built a kiln and simple workshop. As time passed, Maloney added china and glassware to his inventory, again with a focus on low prices. In addition to Maloney's famed salt glaze pottery, Williamsburg Pottery grew to include other artisans that sold a variety of handicrafts, like baskets and lamps.

As sales grew, the small structure mushroomed into many warehouse buildings. By the 1960s, Williamsburg Pottery was the largest U.S. importer of home goods from Asia. Originally located entirely on Route 60, Maloney expanded his business across the railroad tracks in the mid-70s. Williamsburg Pottery eventually added a campground and factory outlet stores, growing to over 200 acres (0.81 km^{2}) and 32 buildings. By the early 1980s, Williamsburg Pottery was earning between $60 and $70 million a year in revenue. However, it began a decline in the 1990s with the rapid growth of other shopping venues on Route 60 closer to Williamsburg, and struggled with the death of its founder in 2005. In 2008, reports claimed that the business was up for sale, although Williamsburg Pottery President Kim Maloney denied these claims.

=== Redevelopment ===
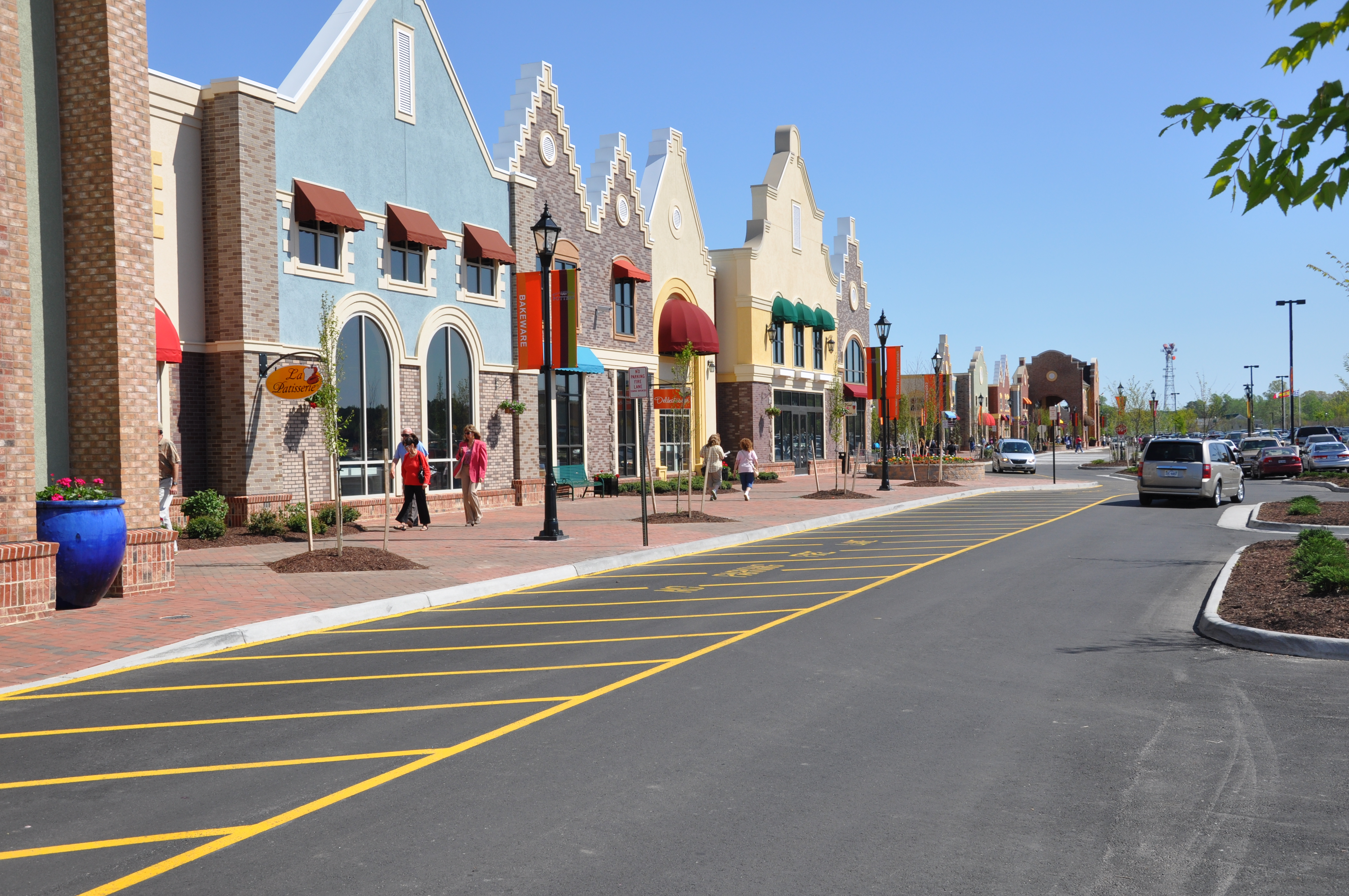
New shopping center (2012)

On August 31, 2010, Kim Maloney unveiled plans for a new $20 million, 146,800-square-foot (13,640 m^{2}) retail development. Construction began on the new Williamsburg Pottery in December 2010 at the original 1938 location on Richmond Road, following demolition of the old outlet buildings on that site. The new development has a much smaller footprint than before, with a more modern, sleek, and upscale look. The renovation, which resembles a Dutch-inspired European Marketplace, only covers 19 acres. It includes three separate buildings that encompass nearly 160,000 sq. ft. of retail and restaurant space, as well as over 10,000 sq. ft. of office space.

The retail project was designed by Guernsey-Tingle Architects. Henderson Inc. was chosen as the General Contractor for the project, and AES Consulting Engineers was selected for the site plan work. All are local companies, as are most of the subcontractors. Demolition began in September 2010, with a groundbreaking ceremony in the beginning of December. Construction was completed in spring of 2012, with a grand opening held on April 5, 2012, the date which would have been founder Jimmy Maloney’s 100th birthday. There was a ceremonial ribbon cutting when they opened to the public.

== Visitors ==
At one time, Williamsburg Pottery was a top tourist attraction in the Historic Triangle. During the mid-1990s, it became such a popular attraction that Amtrak made Williamsburg Pottery a regular stop for passengers, although this stop was discontinued around 1996. It was estimated that more than 3,000,000 people visited Williamsburg Pottery on a yearly basis. As of 2010, visitors had dropped to 500,000 people a year. The number of visitors are not yet available since the 2012 redevelopment. However, even though the Pottery owners have expressed optimism for their long-term goals, they have stated that so far the development has not attracted as many new visitors as they had hoped.

== See also ==
- Williamsburg Soap and Candle Factory
