= Williamsburg Soap and Candle Factory =

Factory in Virginia, United States

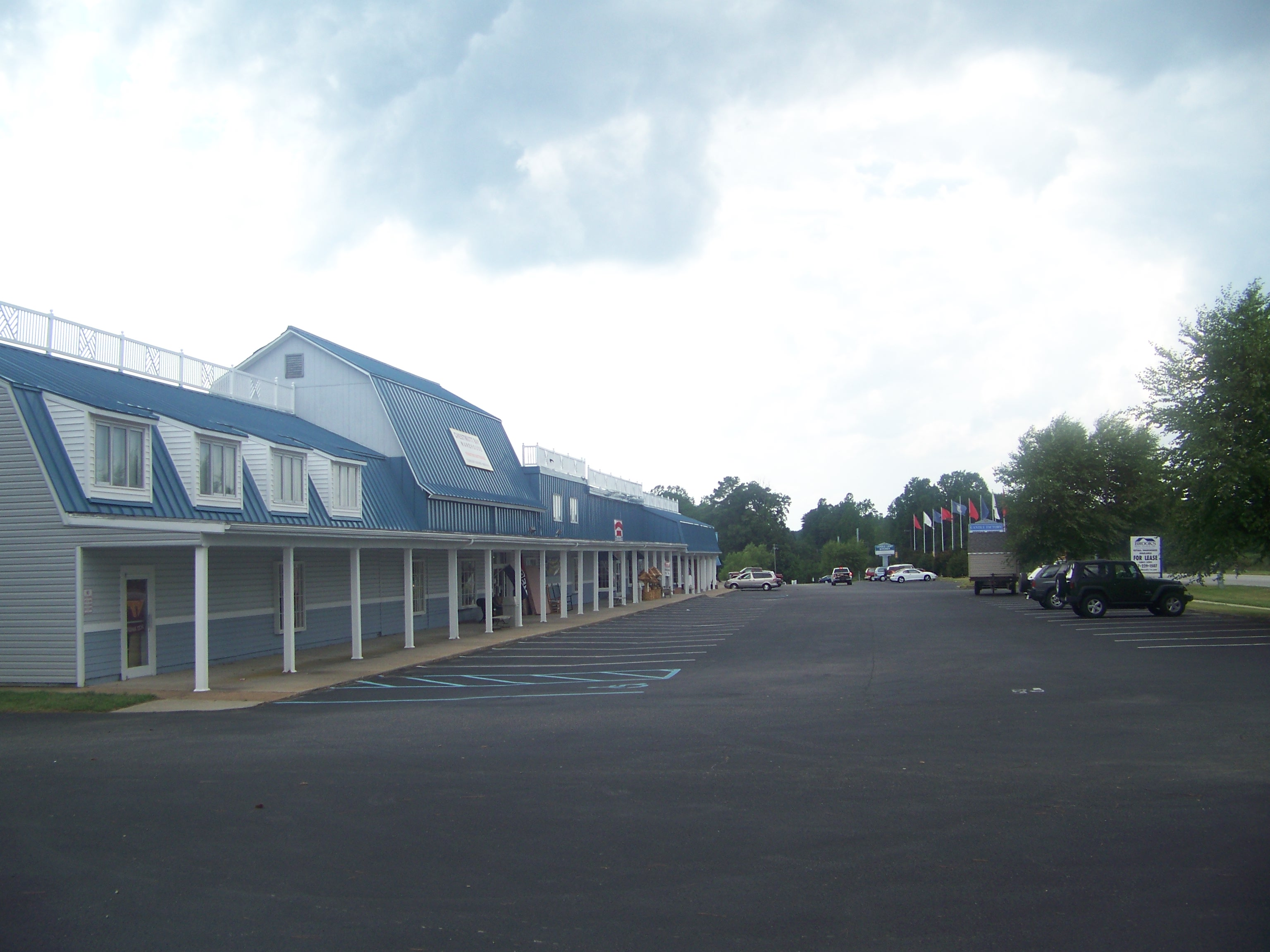
Site of the now defunct Williamsburg Soap and Candle Factory 2007. The majority of the shops on the right side of the complex have since been demolished.

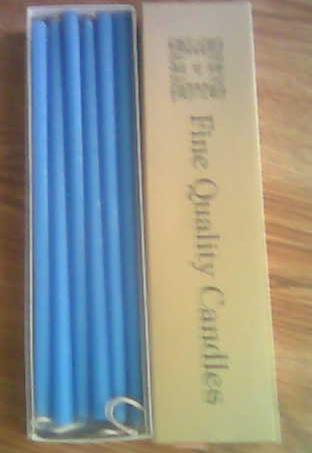
Candles from the Williamsburg Soap and Candle Co.

The Williamsburg Soap and Candle Company, known to millions as just the "candle factory", was located in the Norge section of James City County, Virginia. The factory was famous for making quality soap and candles.

At one time, the Williamsburg Candle Soap and Candle Co. was a major supplier of candles around the world both under their label as well as private label candles for companies such as Estee Lauder, Pottery Barn and others. They were known for their fine quality candles that were dripless and clean burning. All of the candles were made at the on-site manufacturing plant, and all of the candle-making equipment was designed and built by its owners and employees. Customers could view the products being made through a glass window in the store; and were allowed to dip their own candles.

== History ==
=== 20th century foundation and development ===
The Williamsburg Soap and Candle Company first opened in 1965. It was located near the Williamsburg Pottery Factory and was a local icon and popular tourist attraction on the road to Williamsburg. It was founded by John Barnett, Sr., who moved a barn from a nearby farm and made it the first building of a complex which contained the manufacturing plant, numerous shops, and a restaurant.

=== 21st century bankruptcy and aftermath ===
Williamsburg Soap and Candle Company suffered greatly from the drop in tourism after 9/11/01 and from the pressure of cheap Chinese imports. These and other factors ultimately led to its closure in 2005. The company assets were sold at auction. Much of their equipment was purchased by Buyacandle.com. The land was sold to a local developer. The Candle Factory Restaurant remained, and renamed itself the Candle Light Restaurant. A few new stores moved into the vacant factory store fronts but never prospered. The restaurant, along with most of the shops, were forced to close because the space was bought by a large store of a pharmaceutical chain in 2008.

In 2011, the entire right side of the complex was demolished to make room for the new building. The left side of the complex, which includes the original barn, remain. The Candle Light Restaurant reopened in mid-2011 on the remaining side but went out of business in late 2013.
