= Barrett's Ferry Bridge =

- Coordinates: 37°15′50″N 76°52′35″W
- Carries: 2 lanes of SR 5
- Crosses: Chickahominy River
- Locale: James City County, Virginia to Charles City County, Virginia
- Maintained by: Virginia Department of Transportation

Characteristics
- Design: fixed-span bridge
- Total length: 0.5 miles (0.8 km)

History
- Opened: January 24, 2009

Location
- Interactive map of Barrett's Ferry Bridge

The Barrett's Ferry Bridge, officially known as the Judith Stewart Dresser Bridge, is a fixed-span bridge which carries State Route 5 across the Chickahominy River between Charles City County and James City County in eastern Virginia. It connects popular tourism destinations of the James River Plantations with Colonial Williamsburg and Jamestown. The current bridge, which opened on January 24, 2009, replaced the deteriorating 70-year-old bridge.

== 1939 bridge ==
The original bridge, built in 1939 by Tidewater Construction, was a swing-span movable bridge. It was a two-lane facility with a history of opening-closing failures and expensive repairs, as well as height restrictions due to clearance being 13'11" tall. It functioned as a swing-span bridge, pivoting on its axis to allow boats to pass through an opening rather than lifting upward like a drawbridge. The bridge was 2,025 feet long and was 24 feet wide from curb to curb. It was built using timber pilings and had a concrete and steel driving deck. Among repair problems as the bridge aged was shifting of the timber pilings. The current bridge has a height restriction for boats of only 12 feet except when opened.

VDOT closed the bridge several times for limited periods in 2004 when the swing mechanism failed to completely close the bridge, said state officials. The closure inconvenienced residents who regularly used the bridge, forcing on them a 63-mile detour to cross the river. Some frustrated residents parked vehicles at each end of the disabled bridge and either walked or rode golf carts across it. That was when the state decided to replace the aging bridge, which was traveled by an estimated 3,500 vehicles per day, said VDOT Williamsburg Resident Administrator Todd Halacy.

Blasting as part of demolition of the old bridge occurred on March 7, 2009.

== 2009 bridge ==
The current bridge opened on January 24, 2009, about seven months ahead of schedule, according to the Virginia Department of Transportation (VDOT). Construction on the new span, estimated to cost $33.6 million, began in 2007. The new bridge crosses slightly west of the previous span. The fixed-span bridge rises 52 feet above the water and alleviates the necessity of stopping highway traffic to open the movable span on the former bridge, as well as being more convenient for the recreational boaters who can now pass freely upriver to a point near Walkers Dam.

The new bridge also has a much wider travel surface to accommodate bikers and pedestrians. According to VDOT, it features two 12-foot travel lanes, two 10-foot shoulders and a 10-foot shared-use path (separated from the main roadway by a divider) incorporated into the Virginia Capital Trail project.

The bridge is named for Judith Stewart Dresser, who died in 2003 at the age of 57. She lived on the river near the bridge and was a leader in the preservation of historic Route 5 and the establishment of a hospice house in Williamsburg.
