= Lightfoot, Virginia =

Unincorporated community in Virginia, United States

Coordinates: 37°20′27″N 76°45′16″W

Lightfoot (formerly Kelton) is an unincorporated community which straddles the James City–York county border, west of Williamsburg, in the U.S. state of Virginia.

== History and development ==
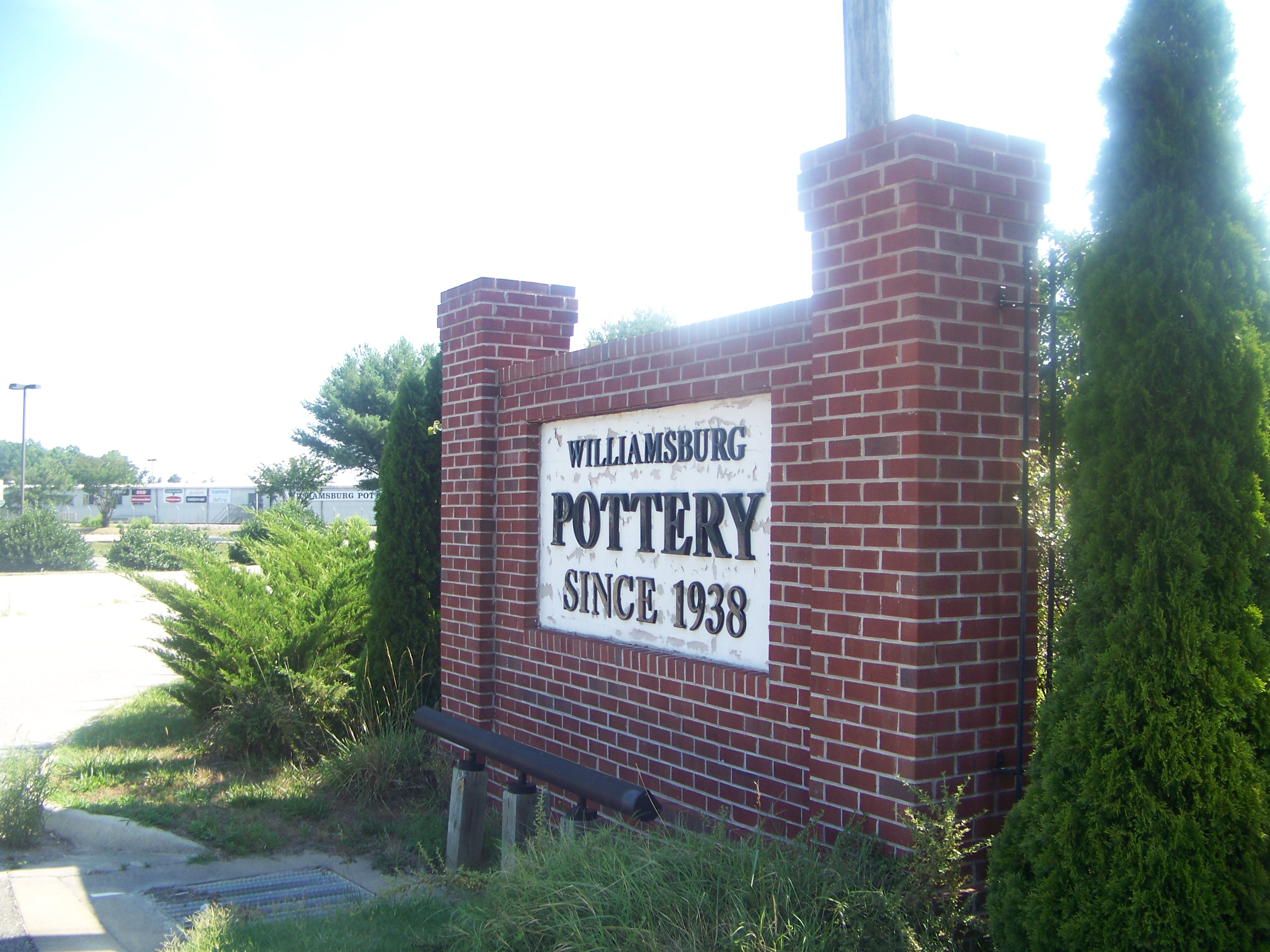
The Williamsburg Pottery Factory was once a vast complex of buildings located in Lightfoot. It has since been renovated.

Originally known as Six-Mile Ordinary, Lightfoot is six miles west of the colonial capital on the Richmond Road (U.S. Route 60), which, as well as Centerville and Longhill roads, dates to the pre-Revolutionary War period. Six-Mile Ordinary was located along the old stagecoach road to New Kent County and Richmond. (An ordinary was a colonial-era tavern with food and lodging for travelers and their horses.)

Nearby, by tradition, the land at War Hill (or, as it came to be called, Warhill) is named for an American Revolutionary War battle that took place there on June 26, 1781, between British troops under Lord Cornwallis and allied forces under the Marquis de Lafayette. Nearly 150 men were killed or wounded in the battle, which occurred during the campaign that led to the victory at Yorktown, establishing independence for Virginia and the United States.

In 1881, the Chesapeake and Ohio Railway was built through the area, and a local station named Kelton was established in what is now the Lightfoot area. The source of the station's name is not clear. In 1882, when a post office was established, the first postmaster suggested the name of Philip Lightfoot, who had been a prominent lawyer and merchant prior to 1748. However, it may also have been named for Lightfoot Taylor, who ran a stage stop there in the 1880s.

In modern times, Lightfoot is probably best known as home to the expansive Williamsburg Pottery Factory. At one time, the entrance to the Lightfoot community had a sign that read "Welcome to Lightfoot, Home of the Williamsburg Pottery Factory."

Lightfoot also has a strip of outlet and specialty shops, hotels, motels, and restaurants, including the Great Wolf Lodge family resort, and a small but popular amusement park called Go-Karts Plus. In 2006, the Sentara Health System opened the new Sentara Williamsburg Regional Medical Center off Mooretown Road. Nearby are Interstate 64, U.S. Route 60 and State Route 199, a semi-circumferential highway around Williamsburg that has its western terminus at Lightfoot.

Near Great Wolf Lodge is Bruton High School, which opened in 1976.

By the late 20th century, the 588-acre (238 ha) Warhill tract was one of the largest undeveloped parcels of land in the area. In 1996, it was purchased for public use. Located on Centerville Road near the interchange of U.S. Route 60 and State Route 199, the land was envisioned as multi-purpose in James City County's "Master Plan." In 1999, the Warhill Sports Complex opened adjacent to the site of the new high school. In 2005, construction began on the new Warhill High School of Williamsburg-James City County Public Schools, which opened in the fall of 2007.

== Climate ==
The climate in this area is characterized by hot, humid summers and generally mild to cool winters. According to the Köppen Climate Classification system, Lightfoot has a humid subtropical climate, abbreviated "Cfa" on climate maps.
