= Virginia State Route 31 =

State highway in eastern Virginia, US

State Route 31

Route information
- Maintained by VDOT
- Length: 24.56 mi (39.53 km)
- Existed: July 1, 1933–present

Major junctions
- South end: US 460 / SR 628 in Wakefield
- SR 10 in Surry
- North end: SR 5 / SR 199 in Williamsburg

Location
- Country: United States
- State: Virginia
- Counties: Sussex, Surry, James City, City of Williamsburg

Highway system
- Virginia Routes; Interstate; US; Primary; Secondary; Byways; History; HOT lanes
← SR 30	→ SR 32

State Route 31 (SR 31) is a primary state highway in the U.S. state of Virginia. The state highway runs 24.56 miles (39.53 km) from U.S. Route 460 (US 460) in Wakefield north to SR 5 and SR 199 in Williamsburg. SR 31 is the primary north–south highway of Surry County, where the highway serves the towns of Surry and Dendron. The state highway also connects Williamsburg with Jamestown. The sections of SR 31 on either side of the James River are connected by the Jamestown Ferry.

== Route description ==
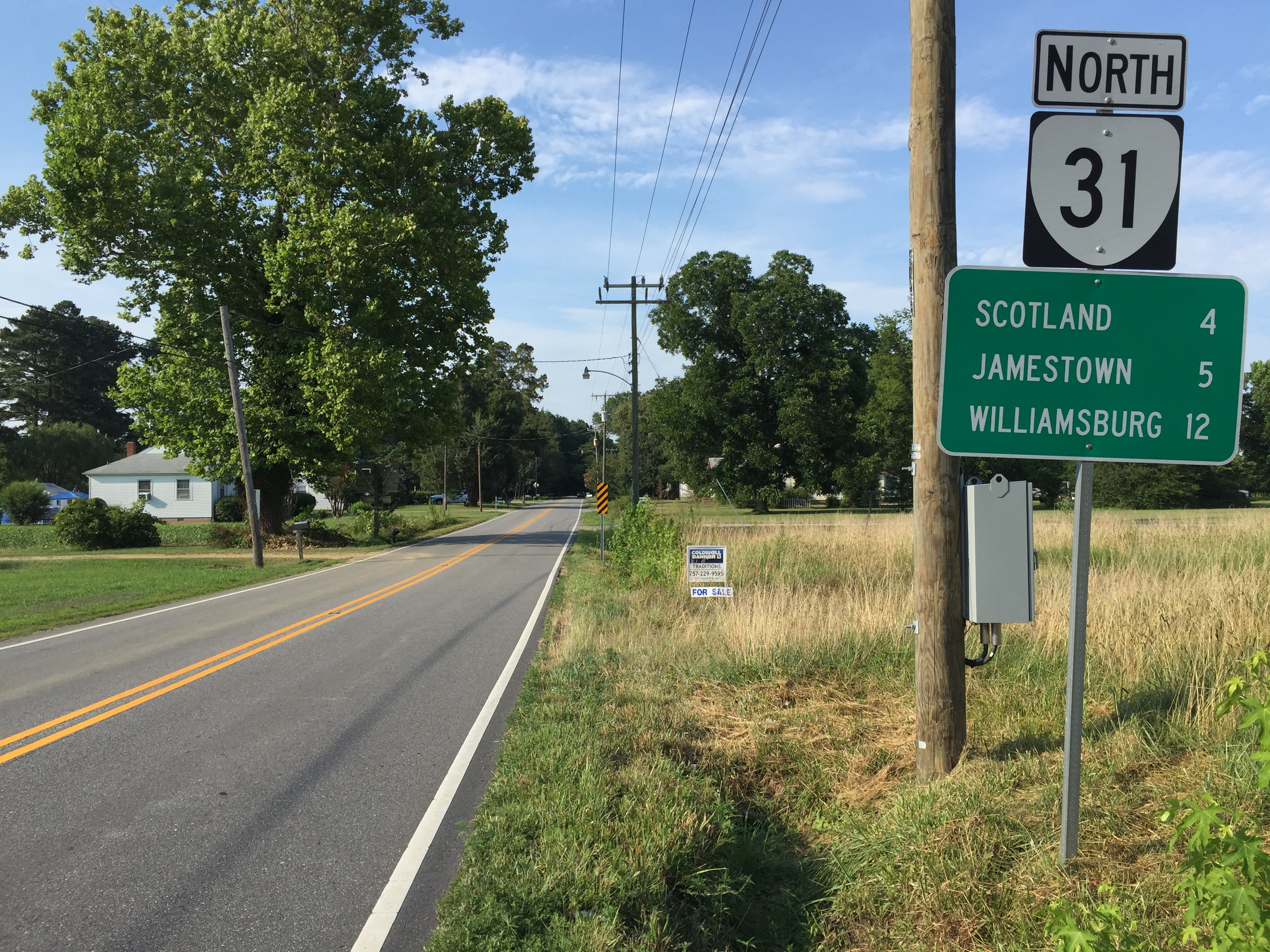
View north along SR 31 north of SR 10 in Surry

SR 31 begins at an intersection with US 460 in the town of Wakefield in Sussex County. The state highway heads east on Main Street, which continues west of US 460 as SR 628. At the eastern town limit, SR 31 veers north onto Birch Island Road. The state highway becomes Rolfe Highway when it enters Surry County right before the highway crosses the Blackwater River. SR 31 heads northeast through town of Dendron and the hamlet of Elberon. The state highway runs concurrently with SR 10 (Colonial Trail) while passing through the town of Surry. North of Surry, SR 31 passes Smith's Fort Plantation before reaching the Scotland terminal of the Jamestown Ferry across the James River. The Jamestown Ferry is the only crossing of the James River between the James River Bridge in Newport News and the Benjamin Harrison Memorial Bridge near Hopewell.

SR 31 resumes at the Jamestown terminal of the ferry at Glass House Point in James City County. The state highway, which heads northeast as Jamestown Road, passes Jamestown Festival Park and has an intersection with SR 359, a short connector between SR 31 and Colonial Parkway. SR 31 leaves Jamestown and crosses over Powhatan Creek and Lake Powell. The state highway passes through the suburban area surrounding Williamsburg before reaching its northern terminus at SR 199 (Humelsine Parkway) just inside the city limits. Jamestown Road continues northeast as SR 5 beyond SR 199; westbound SR 5 joins SR 199 in a short concurrency west toward Richmond.

== History ==
The first piece of the present SR 31 to exist as a state highway ran from Williamsburg southwest to Jamestown. It was a spur of State Route 9 (roughly current U.S. Route 60), and was present in the initial 1918 system. SR 9 was renumbered as State Route 39 in the 1923 renumbering, and the Yorktown spur became State Route 392.

The Jamestown-Scotland Ferry began operations February 26, 1925 from the Jamestown end of SR 392 to Scotland across the James River.

The road on the Scotland side was added to the state highway system from 1926 to 1931, at first as an extension of State Route 351, but soon as part of SR 392. In the 1928 renumbering the route was renumbered State Route 510.

Capitol Landing Road from Williamsburg to Magruder was added to the state highway system in 1932 as State Route 542. Later that year, both SR 510 and SR 524 became State Route 31, connected by Francis Street in Williamsburg (U.S. Route 60, formerly State Route 39).

== Major intersections ==
County	Location	mi	km	Destinations	Notes
Sussex	Wakefield	0.00	0.00	US 460 (South County Drive) / SR 628 (West Main Street) – Courtland, Suffolk, Waverly	Southern terminus
Sussex	Wakefield			SR 617 (Rocky Hock Road) – Bacons Castle	former SR 196 east
Surry		14.65	23.58	SR 10 west (Colonial Trail West) – Hopewell, Richmond	South end of concurrency with SR 10
Surry	Surry	15.69	25.25	SR 10 east (Colonial Trail East) / SR 626 (Oakwood Drive) – Suffolk, Smithfield, Chippokes Plantation State Park	North end of concurrency with SR 10
James River		20.10	32.35	Jamestown-Scotland Ferry	
James City				SR 359 (Jamestown Festival Parkway) / SR 614 north (Greensprings Road) – Jamestown Settlement, Colonial Parkway, Historic Jamestowne	
James City				SR 681 (Sandy Bay Road) to SR 5 west – Dunbar, truck route to SR 615	
James City				SR 615 (Ironbound Road)	
City of Williamsburg		24.56	39.53	SR 5 (Jamestown Road) / SR 199 – Downtown Williamsburg, William & Mary Hall, Colonial Williamsburg Visitor Center via Parkway, Busch Gardens	Northern terminus
1.000 mi = 1.609 km; 1.000 km = 0.621 mi: Concurrency terminus

< SR 391	Spurs of SR 39; 1923–1928	SR 393 >
< SR 509	District 5 State Routes; 1928–1933	SR 511 >
< SR 541	District 5 State Routes; 1928–1933	none
