= Jamestown Ferry =

Ferry service in the U.S. state of Virginia

Coordinates: 37.2009°N 76.7844°W

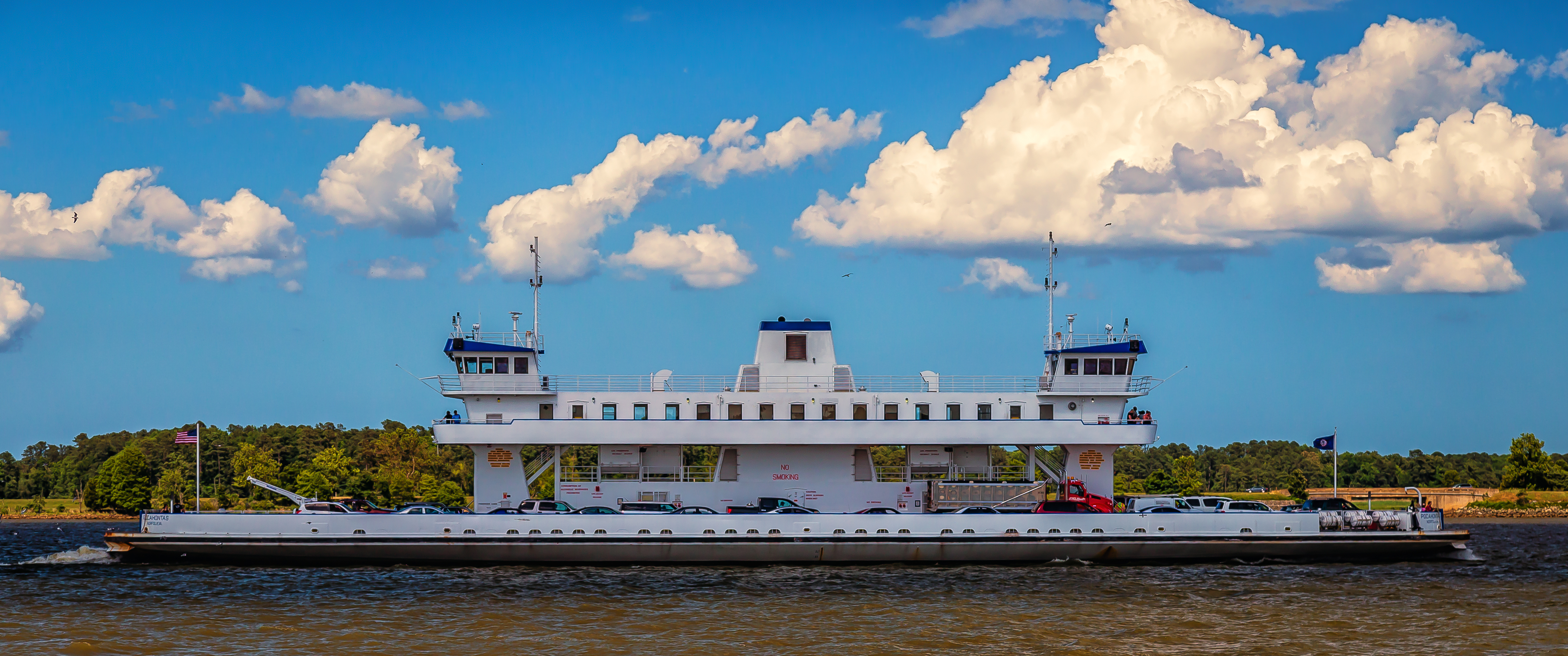
- The Pocahontas carrying vehicles across the James River in 2015
- Waterway: James River
- Route: Virginia State Route 31
- Carries: Automobiles and buses
- Operator: Virginia Department of Transportation
- Began operation: 1925; state run since 1945
- No. of vessels: 4 (Pocahontas, Williamsburg, Surry, Powhatan)

The Jamestown Ferry (also known as the Jamestown-Scotland Ferry) is a free automobile and bus ferry service across a navigable portion of the James River in Virginia. It carries State Route 31, connecting Jamestown in James City County with Scotland Wharf in Surry County.

The service provides the only vehicle crossing of the river between the James River Bridge downstream at Newport News and the Benjamin Harrison Memorial Bridge upriver near Hopewell. It is toll-free and operated 24 hours a day, 7 days a week by the Virginia Department of Transportation (VDOT). The vessels carry over 900,000 passengers annually. Operations are based at the Scotland Wharf in Surry County.

== History ==
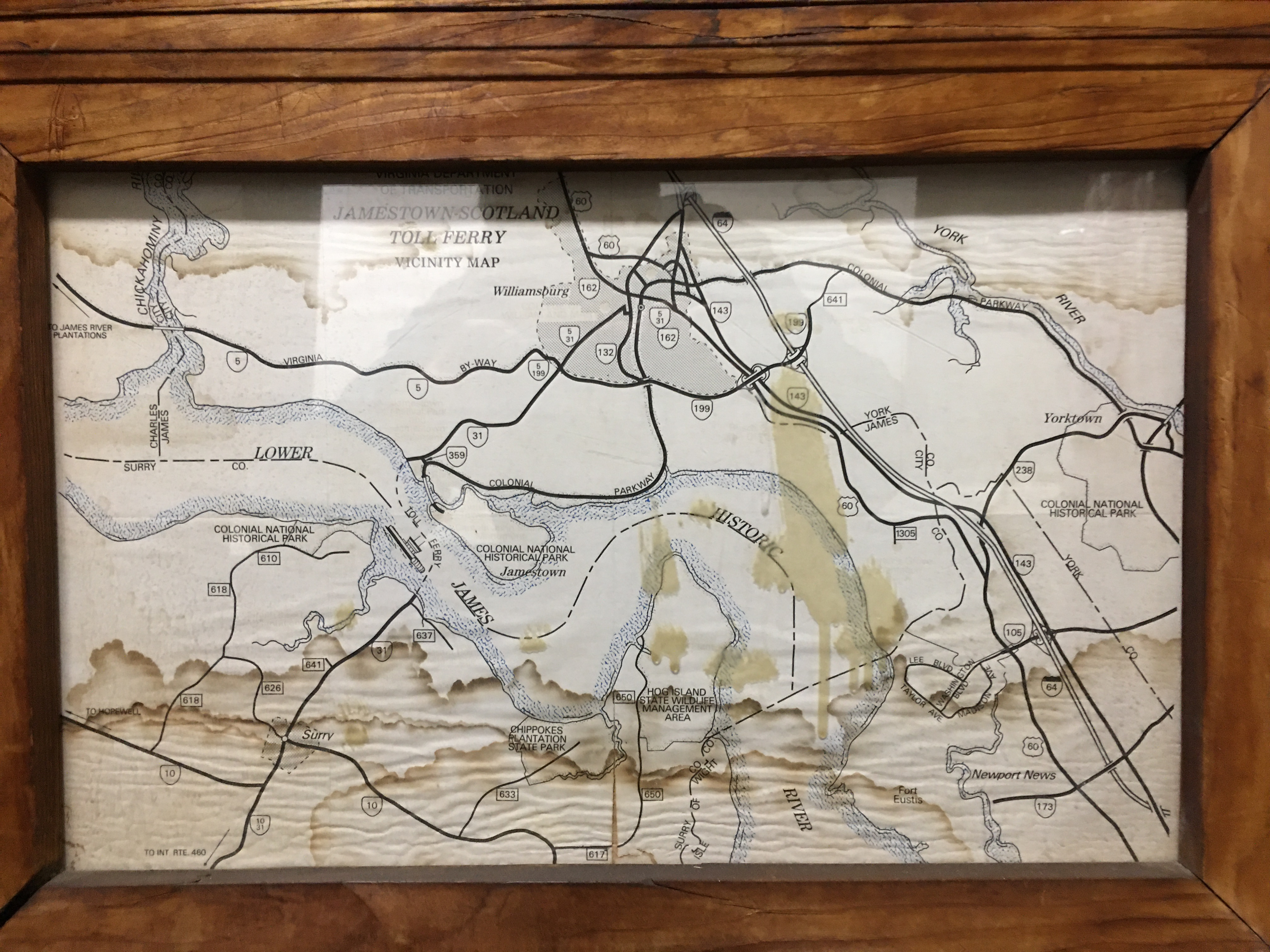
Map of the ferry route. This map is undated but it denotes the system being tolled. This map was also drawn up before The Humelsine Parkway was extended.

The Jamestown Ferry service was privately established in 1925. The Commonwealth of Virginia acquired it and the Department of Transportation (VDOT) assumed operations in 1945. It runs it as a state service. Nearly a million vehicles make the fifteen-minute voyage across the James each year.

The ferryboat Captain John Smith made the first automobile-ferry crossing of the James River on February 26, 1925. The privately owned business was founded by Captain Albert F. Jester. After the Captain John Smith was retired in the early 1950s, the deckhouse was put into adaptive use. For another 50 years, it was used as a private waterside cottage, perched on pilings in the Elizabeth River near Portsmouth. In 2003, the deckhouse was removed and donated to a preservation group in Surry County.

== Bridge alternative considerations ==
The Eastern Virginia Bridge Company considered building a bridge at the ferry location in 1928. Replacing the ferry with a bridge is an issue which has been revisited by politicians, transportation officials, and the communities. Elmon T. Gray, who represented the area in the Virginia Senate from 1972 until 1992, advocated a bridge to replace the ferry for many years but the bridge was vehemently opposed by residents of a nearby upscale waterfront residential community in James City County as well as historic preservationists. The plan was ultimately defeated when the Commonwealth Transportation Board unanimously killed plans for the proposed span in 1991.

Given the strong opposition of local residents on both sides of the river and the cost of such construction, plans for a bridge have not gained broad support since. Opponents are concerned with adverse effects of potential increases in population that a permanent crossing may cause on the southern shore of the James River. In addition, the need to provide deepwater access for shipping would require either a high bridge or drawbridge, adding to the potential cost. There has been a strong desire by VDOT to avoid building any new drawbridges since the disastrous 1977 collision of the SS Marine Floridian into the Benjamin Harrison Bridge at Jordan Point, a drawbridge located 35 miles upstream. The area south of the James is very rural and tolls would not be sufficient to cover the cost of construction. Other critics cite the negative effect of a bridge on views from Jamestown Island, the Colonial Parkway, and the surrounding area. They are also concerned about increased traffic on the two-lane roads on either side.

Periodically a ferry vessel will be out of service for repairs and inspection, and motorists experience delays. Existing alternate routes to the east include the James River Bridge on Route 17, and the Interstate 664 Monitor-Merrimac Memorial Bridge-Tunnel, and to the west the Benjamin Harrison Bridge on Route 106 or the interstate 295 Varina-Enon Bridge.

== Current ferry operations ==
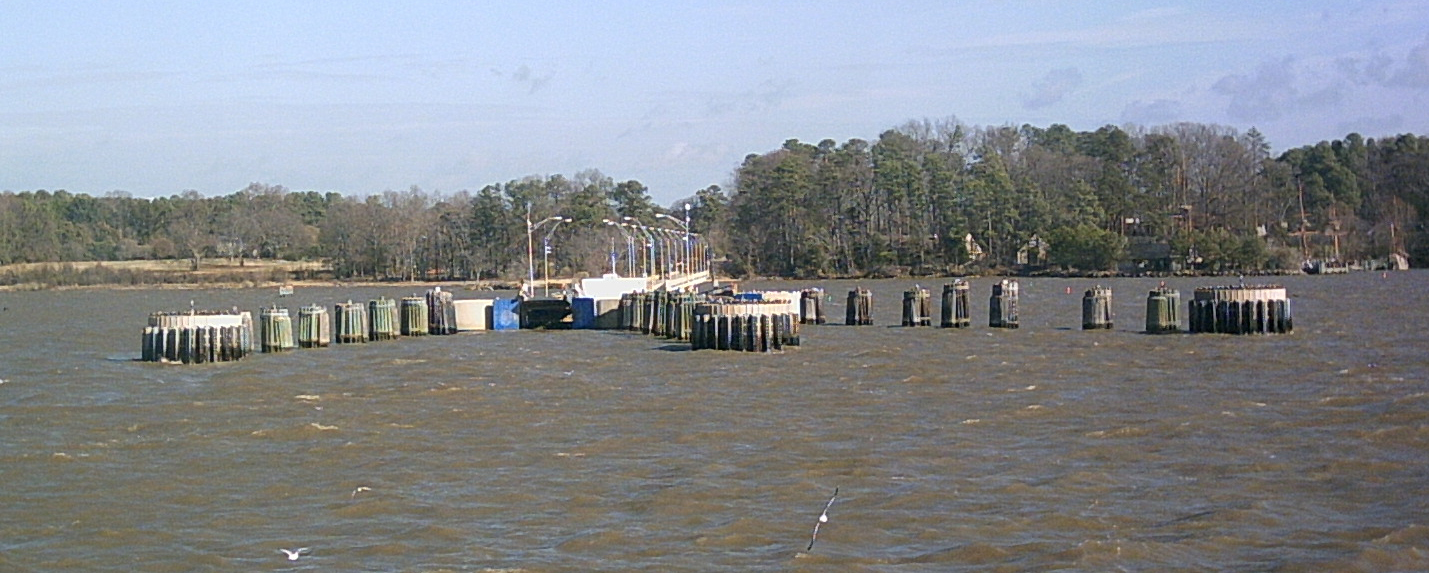
Ferry pier at Jamestown, seen from the departing ferry

The ferry operates 24 hours a day with a minimum of a single vessel in service at all times; additional frequencies are added with a second ship during the day and a third during times of high traffic in the summer. The Virginia Department of Transportation owns and operates four vessels for the service—Powhatan, Pocahontas, Surry, and Williamsburg. Powhatan can carry up to 70 vehicles and 499 passengers, and was built by VT Halter Marine in 2018 to replace the 1936-built Virginia that had a capacity of only 28 cars. Pocahontas, built in 1995, has a capacity of 70 vehicles and 444 passengers, and sister ships Surry, built in 1979, and Williamsburg can each carry up to 50 vehicles and 360 people.

== Park and Ride bus service ==
To mitigate rush-hour traffic and delays due to security measures, in October 2007, Williamsburg Area Transit Authority (WATA) began a Park and Ride transit bus service from three stops in Surry County to limited stops at several major points in James City County and Williamsburg. These terminate at the Williamsburg Transportation Center in the downtown area adjacent to the historic area of Colonial Williamsburg. As of October 2016, the route terminates at the Jamestown Settlement, where passengers may transfer to WATA's Jamestown Route to connect to the Williamsburg Transportation Center.

- At the Williamsburg Transportation Center, connections are available with:
  - Eight other WAT routes covering portions of the city, areas in upper and lower James City County, the Bruton District of York County, and the western tip of Newport News at Lee Hall;
  - an express route of Hampton Roads Transit (HRT);
  - intercity bus services from Greyhound Lines (and its Carolina Trailways affiliate); and
  - intercity passenger rail service by Amtrak.
- Surry County stops include Surry Government Center, Surry Community Center, the Surry branch of the Blackwater Regional Library and the VDOT Park and Ride lot near Scotland Wharf.

The bus makes three round trips each morning and three each afternoon during peak commuter periods, Monday through Saturday. The daily fare is $3.00 as of October 2016, which includes the cost of any transfers to other WATA routes.

== Scotland in Surry County ==
"Scotland in Surry County" is only a short distance from the Town of Surry and State Route 10, which runs between Richmond and Suffolk. Highway 10 parallels the south bank of the James River, serving Hopewell and Smithfield.

Highway 10 provides access to many historical sites, including City Point, Flowerdew Hundred Plantation, Upper Brandon Plantation, Lower Brandon Plantation, Chippokes Plantation State Park, Bacon's Castle, Smith's Fort Plantation, and the Isle of Wight County Museum in Smithfield.

== In popular culture ==
The ferry served as the title and subject for Tanya Tucker's 1972 top-ten country single "The Jamestown Ferry", composed by Mack Vickery and Bobby Borchers. This song has more recently been covered by Charley Crockett in 2017.
