= Virginia State Route 199 =

State highway in Virginia, United States

State Route 199
- Humelsine Parkway

Route information
- Maintained by VDOT
- Length: 14.13 mi (22.74 km)
- Existed: late 1960s–present

Major junctions
- West end: I-64 / SR 646 in Lightfoot
- US 60 in Lightfoot; SR 5 / SR 31 in Williamsburg; US 60 near Williamsburg; I-64 near Williamsburg
- East end: SR 641 near Williamsburg

Location
- Country: United States
- State: Virginia
- Counties: James City, City of Williamsburg, York

Highway system
- Virginia Routes; Interstate; US; Primary; Secondary; Byways; History; HOT lanes
← SR 198	→ SR 200

State Route 199 (SR 199) is a primary state highway in the U.S. state of Virginia. Known for most of its length as Humelsine Parkway, the state highway runs 14.13 miles (22.74 km) from Interstate 64 (I-64) and SR 646 in Lightfoot to SR 641 near Williamsburg. VA 199 forms a western loop of Williamsburg in York and James City Counties. The state highway, which is entirely a four-lane limited-access highway with a mix of intersections and interchanges, provides access from I-64 to several highways that serve attractions around Williamsburg, including U.S. Route 60 (US 60) and Colonial Parkway, an automobile parkway that leads to Colonial Williamsburg, Jamestown, and Yorktown. VA 199 between its junctions with I-64 is named for Carlisle H. Humelsine, a former curator and president of Colonial Williamsburg, in 2004.

== Route description ==
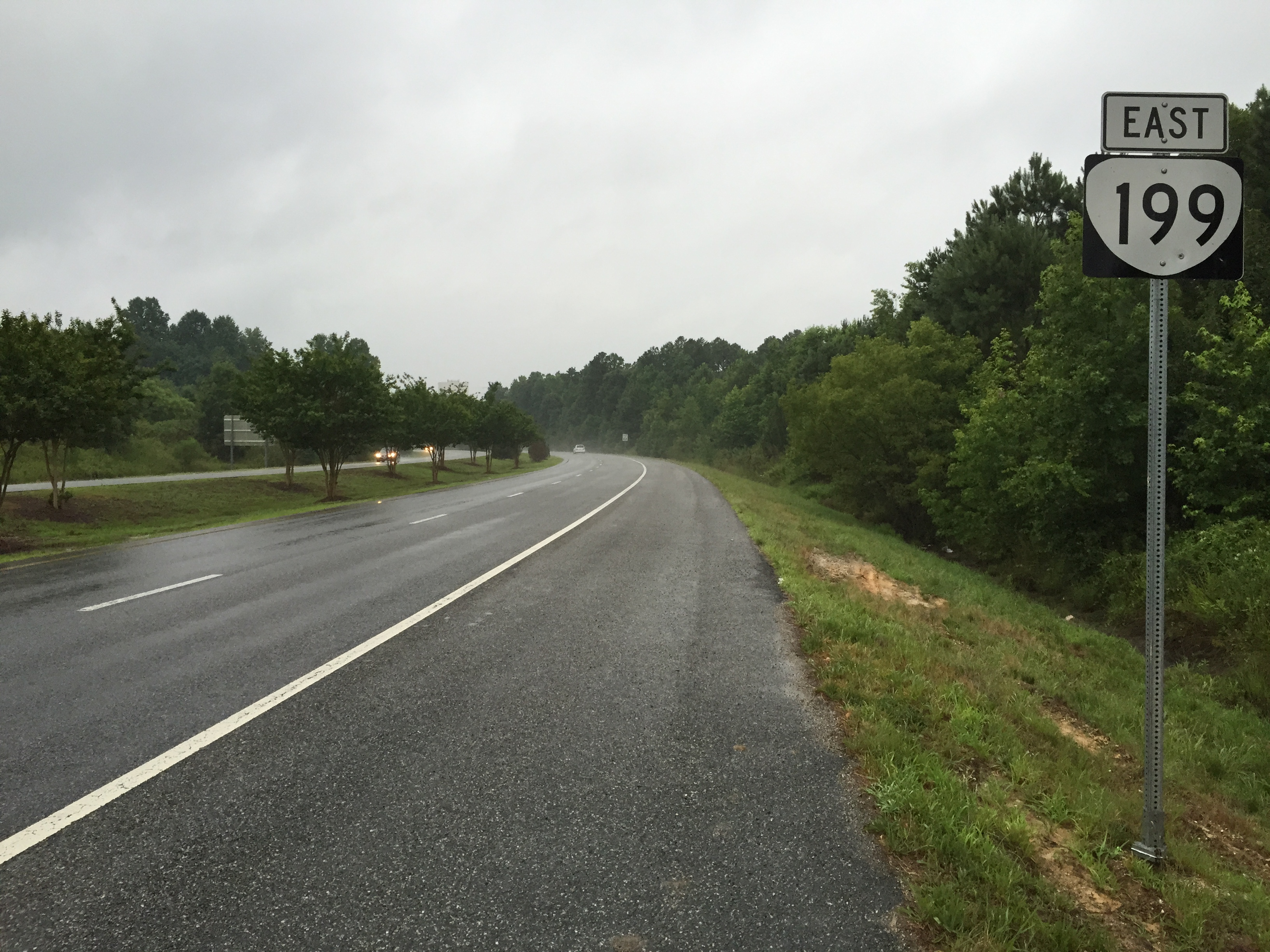
View east along SR 199 just south of US 60 in Lightfoot, James City County

VA 199 begins at I-64 Exit 234, a partial cloverleaf interchange, in Lightfoot in the northwest corner of York County. The roadway continues north as SR 646 (Newman Road), which reduces to two lanes just north of the interchange on its way to York River State Park. VA 199 heads southwest as a four-lane freeway, paralleled by another section of SR 646, Lightfoot Road, on the eastbound (south-facing) side and Rochambeau Drive on the westbound side of the highway. The state highway meets SR 603 (Mooretown Road) at a cloverleaf interchange between a big box shopping center on the east and the Williamsburg Pottery Factory grounds to the west. VA 199 crosses over Old Mooretown Road, CSX's Peninsula Subdivision, and US 60 (Richmond Road), entering James City County immediately before an interchange with US 60 on the south side of the tracks. The state highway curves south, passing through a forested corridor between residential subdivisions and has partial cloverleaf interchanges with SR 612 (Longhill Road) and VA 321 (Monticello Avenue).

VA 199's western freeway section ends at an intersection with VA 5 (John Tyler Memorial Highway). VA 5 joins VA 199 in a concurrency as the highway curves to the southeast and enters the city of Williamsburg. VA 5 leaves the highway at the intersection with VA 31 (Jamestown Road). VA 31 heads southwest towards Jamestown while SR 5 and SR 31 together head northeast toward downtown Williamsburg and the campus of the College of William & Mary. VA 199 crosses the boundary between the city of Williamsburg and James City County twice more before leaving the city limits for good prior to the intersection with Brookwood Drive.

VA 199 curves to the east and crosses College Creek before a combined intersection and interchange with VA 132 (Henry Street) and Colonial Parkway. VA 199 meets VA 132 at an intersection from which all movements to and from westbound Colonial Parkway (toward Jamestown) can be made. Access to eastbound Colonial Parkway (toward Williamsburg and Yorktown) is made via tight cloverleaf ramps. VA 199 meets Mounts Bay Road and Quarterpath Road at an intersection before beginning its eastern freeway segment. The state highway meets US 60 (Pocahontas Trail) and VA 143 (Merrimac Trail) at adjacent partial cloverleaf interchanges. Between the interchanges VA 199 crosses over both highways and the Peninsula Subdivision rail line that separates the two highways, re-entering York County in the process. VA 199 curves to the northeast ahead of a cloverleaf interchange with I-64 (Exit 242), where the freeway section ends. The state highway intersects Marquis Parkway and Water Country Parkway before passing the entrance to Water Country USA. VA 199 continues north through a forested area to its northern terminus at SR 641 (Penniman Road). SR 641 heads west from the intersection toward Williamsburg and continues north along VA 199's alignment, reducing to two lanes as the highway heads toward a junction with Colonial Parkway and the Naval Supply Center Cheatham Annex.

== Major intersections ==
County	Location	mi	km	Destinations	Notes
York	Burkes Corner	0.00	0.00	I-64 / SR 646 west (Newman Road) – Colonial Williamsburg, Norfolk, Richmond	Exit 234 (I-64); western terminus
York		0.71	1.14	SR 603 (Mooretown Road) / to Rochambeau Drive (SR F137) / Lightfoot Road (SR 646)	Cloverleaf interchange
James City	Lightfoot	1.79	2.88	US 60 – Lightfoot, Williamsburg	interchange
James City		4.27	6.87	SR 612 (Longhill Road)	interchange
James City		6.10	9.82	SR 321 (Monticello Avenue) – Williamsburg	Single-point urban interchange
James City		7.55	12.15	SR 5 west (John Tyler Highway) to SR 616 – Richmond	Western end of SR 5 concurrency
City of Williamsburg		8.01	12.89	SR 5 east / SR 31 south (Jamestown Road) – Williamsburg, Jamestown, College of William & Mary, Colonial Williamsburg Visitor Center	Eastern end of SR 5 concurrency
James City				SR 700 (Brookwood Drive) – Airport	
James City		9.79	15.76	SR 132 north (South Henry Street) / SR 1201 (Kingpoint Drive) / Colonial Parkway – Jamestown, Yorktown, William & Mary Law School, Downtown Williamsburg, Colonial Williamsburg Visitor Center	interchange
James City				SR 637 (Quarter Path Road / Mounts Bay Road)	
James City		12.09	19.46	US 60 (Pocahontas Trail) – Williamsburg, Colonial Williamsburg, Busch Gardens	interchange
York		12.18	19.60	SR 143 (Merrimac Trail) – Williamsburg	interchange
York		13.12	21.11	I-64 – Richmond, Busch Gardens, Norfolk	Exit 242 (I-64)
York		14.13	22.74	SR 641 (Penniman Road) – Cheatham Annex, Colonial Parkway	Eastern terminus
1.000 mi = 1.609 km; 1.000 km = 0.621 mi: Concurrency terminus
