= Lake Powell (Virginia) =

- Location within Virginia
- Location: James City County, Virginia
- Coordinates: 37.237868°N 76.746528°W
- Type: man-made lake

Lake Powell is an artificial pond located in James City County, Virginia. In 2006, flood damage from Tropical Storm Ernesto caused the earthen retaining dam which formed the lake to burst and empty.

== Description and history ==
Lake Powell is located in James City County, Virginia within three miles of the historic Jamestown site and colonial Williamsburg. The lake was formed by the damming of Mill Creek. The origins of the lake are unknown, though some sources contend it was dammed as early as the 1750s. The earliest confirmed records of the lake are from the Peninsula Water Company and date to some time in the 1800s. In 1924, the lake was purchased by the Powell Family for which it is now named. Prior to its break, the lake covered 81 acres. All lake shore access was located on private property, though the lake itself was owned by a separate private party. The dam holding back Lake Powell has broken numerous times in the past, including four times since 1991 alone, with the first major break occurring in 1999 due to Hurricane Floyd. The latest break occurred on October 7, 2006, when rains from Tropical Storm Ernesto caused a major breach that caused the dam to burst. Currently, the former lake bed contains a variable amount of muddy water. Much of it has since started to grow in with brush.

== Plans for repair ==
Plans to reconstruct the dam were considered soon after the last break, though nothing was done. It was suggested that public funds might be used to help pay for the repair costs. The destruction of Lake Powell has resulted in a massive and continuing reduction in property assessments for lakeshore property, including by 17% in 2007 alone, and 10-20% each additional year. In early 2010, Lake Powell's owners submitted an application to turn the former lake into a wetlands mitigation bank, credits from which could be sold to developers for up to $25,000 per acre. The plan caused immediate opposition from lake shore property owners who wanted the lake restored. The proposal then began the process of government environmental review which started with the Army Corps of Engineers. In September, the Corps of Engineers rejected the proposal, citing questions concerning property rights, the necessity to build a sill structure to control water levels (wetlands banks must be naturally self-sufficient), and the large degree of naturalization which the lake has undertaken on its own since the break.

Current plans call for Lake Powell to be restored utilizing both a tax leveled on lake shore property owners and public funding. The tax had been voted for unanimously by the home owners. Since its initial break, the cost of restoring the lake has been a matter of contention with numerous estimates given, some ranging as high as $2.8 million. However, these appear to be considerable overestimations, with the actual cost closer to $750,000. As part of using tax dollars to fund the repair, Lake Powell would be open to public recreation for the first time. Most recently, an additional proposal has been made to turn the lake into a nutrient bank. This would function in a similar way as the failed mitigation banking scheme in that population mitigation credits would be sold to bidding companies; however, in this case, the dam would have to be rebuilt and the lake restored, thus satisfying lake shore property owners. Plans for the restoration of Lake Powell have been affected by the competing aims of involved parties. Lake shore property owners have been adamant in having the lake restored to return both the aesthetic effects and use of the lake and to reverse the steady decline in property values which have occurred since the break. The lake's owners, however, stood to benefit considerably from the transformation of the former lake into wetlands credits. In addition to opposition from lake shore property owners who oppose any plan which does not lead to restoration of the lake, state officials opposed the wetlands bank proposal based on concerns about how property lines are affected due to the altered position of the lake banks. As it currently stands, restoration of the lake with the addition of public finances seems the most likely outcome.
