= Virginia State Route 5 =

State highway in eastern Virginia, US

State Route 5

Route information
- Maintained by VDOT
- Length: 54.96 mi (88.45 km)
- Existed: July 1, 1933–present
- Tourist routes: Virginia Byway

Major junctions
- West end: US 60 in Richmond
- SR 895 near Richmond; I-295 near Richmond; SR 156 at Granville; SR 106 / SR 156 at Kimages; SR 155 in Charles City; SR 199 near Williamsburg; SR 31 / SR 199 near Williamsburg; SR 132 in Williamsburg; US 60 in Williamsburg
- East end: SR 143 in Williamsburg

Location
- Country: United States
- State: Virginia
- Counties: City of Richmond, Henrico, Charles City, James City, City of Williamsburg

Highway system
- Virginia Routes; Interstate; US; Primary; Secondary; Byways; History; HOT lanes
| ← SR 4 | → SR 6 |

Virginia State Route 5 (SR 5) is a primary state highway in the Commonwealth of Virginia. It runs between the independent cities of Richmond and Williamsburg. Between Charles City County and James City County, it crosses the Chickahominy River via the Judith Stewart Dresser Bridge, a fixed-span bridge which replaced historic Barrett's Ferry and the former drawbridge.

The entire length of SR 5 outside Richmond and Williamsburg is a Virginia Byway. Since 2015, the Virginia Capital Trail dedicated pedestrian and bicycle trail runs alongside the automobile highway.

== Route description ==
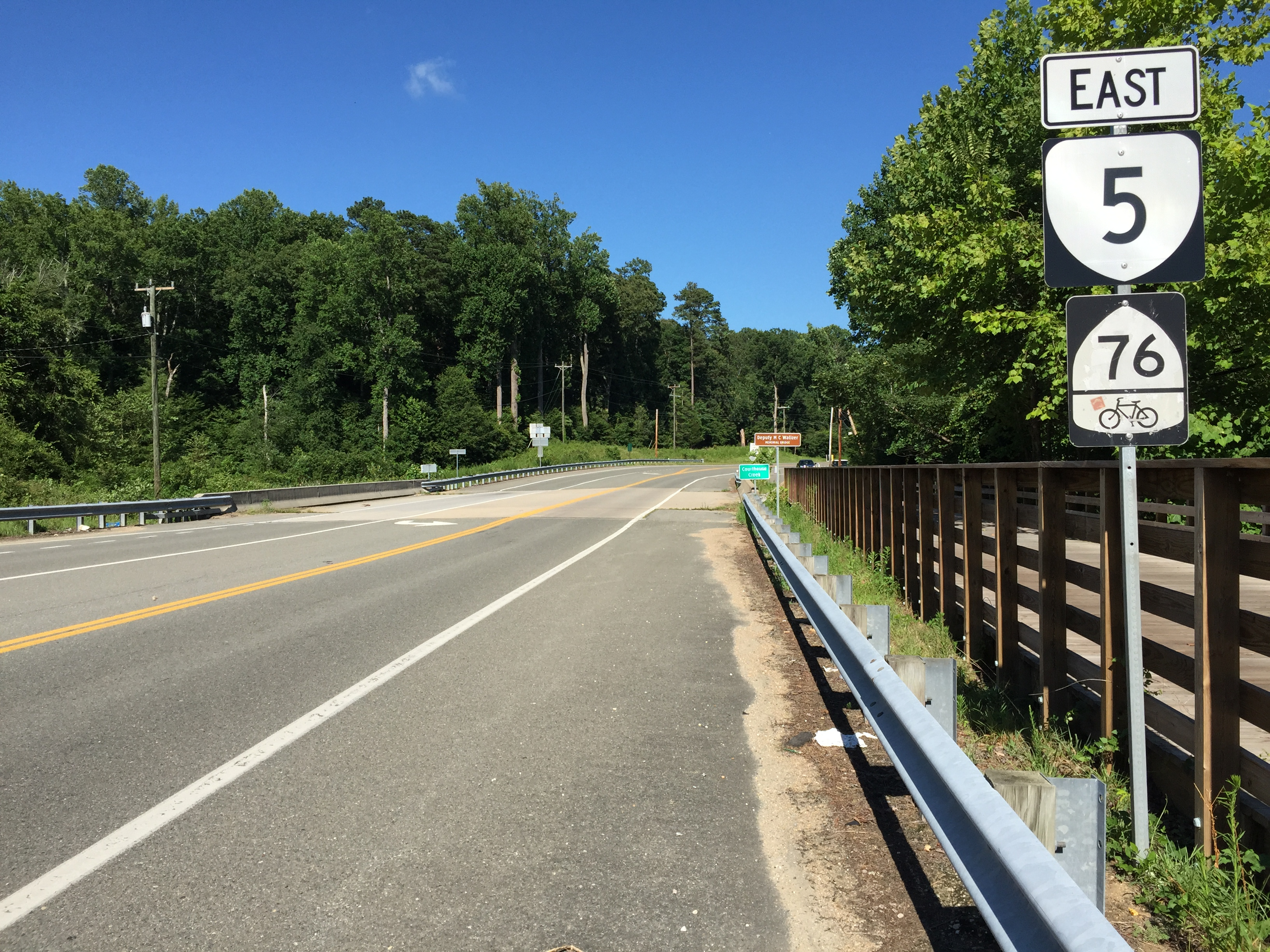
View east along SR 5 at SR 155 in Charles City

For much of its distance, SR 5 generally parallels the north bank of the James River, following the path of older colonial roads. It passes through three of the original eight shires created in the Colony of Virginia in 1634 by King Charles I of England. These are James City County, Charles City County, and Henrico County, moving from east to west as the area was developed in the colonial period.

== James River plantations ==
Some of the larger and older of the extant James River Plantations are along the route. None is owned by any government. Houses and/or grounds are generally open daily to visitors, with various admission fees applicable. From west to east, these are the Shirley Plantation, Edgewood Plantation, Berkeley Plantation, Westover Plantation, Evelynton Plantation, Belle Air Plantation, Piney Grove at Southall's Plantation, North Bend Plantation and Sherwood Forest Plantation.

== History ==
The first piece of SR 5 was added to the state highway system in 1923, a portion of the road running west from Charles City for 18.5 miles (29.8 km) toward Richmond, and was numbered State Route 41. Three miles (4.8 km) were added in 1924, 6.39 miles (10.28 km) were added in 1925, and the remaining 3.5 miles (5.6 km), taking the route to the Richmond city limits, were added in 1927.

An extension to the east, heading north from Charles City to State Route 39 (now U.S. Route 60) at Providence Forge, was added in 1926. In the 1928 renumbering of state roads, this was designated as State Route 413, since a new alignment of SR 41, heading east from Charles City toward Williamsburg for eight miles (13 km), was added to the state highway system, as was a 4.5-mile (7.2 km) piece at the other end, heading west from State Route 510 (now State Route 31). A further 3.50 miles (5.63 km) from the west and 2.80 miles (4.51 km) from the east were added in 1930 and 1931, and, in 1932, the route was completed from Richmond to Williamsburg, with 3.00 miles (4.83 km) from the west and 1.70 miles (2.74 km) from the east.

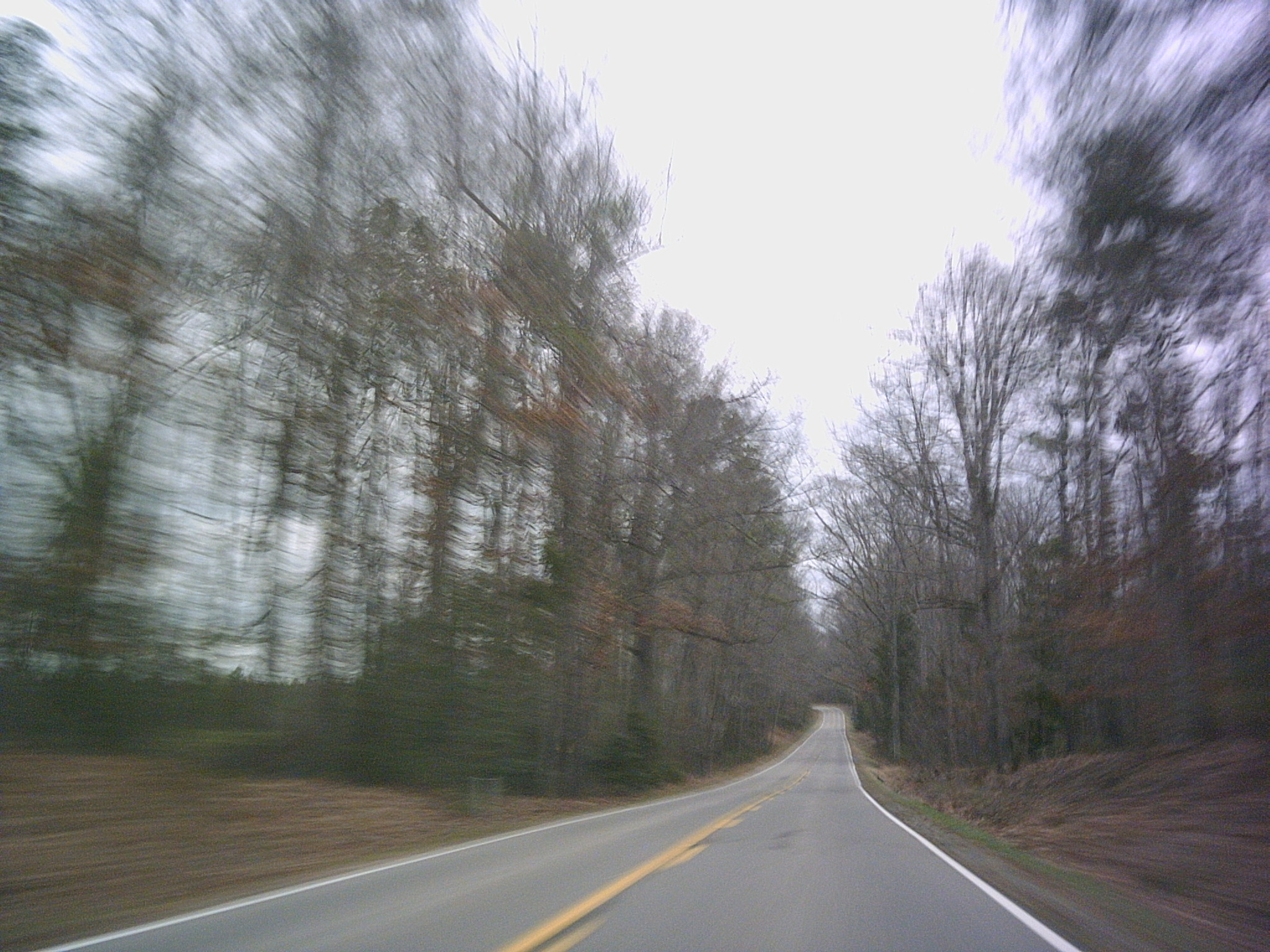
SR 5 in Charles City County, near the Henrico County line

The road from State Route 32 (now U.S. Route 15) at Zion Crossroads east to Oilville was added to the state highway system by 1923 as State Route 321. Extensions east from Oilville were added for four miles (6.4 km) in 1924, six miles (9.7 km) in 1925, and 7.5 miles (12.1 km) in 1926. By 1927, SR 321 became an extension of SR 41 west from Richmond, and that year the former SR 321 was extended 3.5 miles (5.6 km), the rest of the way to Richmond.

SR 321/SR 41 was also extended west for 2.0 miles (3.2 km) in 1926, two more miles in 1927, and 5.4 miles (8.7 km) - the rest of the way to State Route 39 (now State Route 22) at Shadwell - in 1928.

In Richmond, SR 41 initially used Broad Street, a hairpin turn through Chimborazo Park, Fulton Street, Williamsburg Road, Hatcher Street, Newton Road, and New Osborne Turnpike.

State Route 39 from Shadwell west to Monterey, now U.S. Route 250, was part of the initial 1918 state highway system (numbered State Route 9 until 1923). It initially continued west from Monterey on present US 250, but by 1924 it used current State Route 84 west to West Virginia. The road west from Monterey towards West Virginia Route 56 (now U.S. Route 250) for 7.86 miles (12.65 km) was added to the state highway system in 1930 and 1932 as State Route 835; the remaining mileage to the state line was added in 1933.

In the 1933 renumbering, State Routes 41 and 835 both became part of a new State Route 5, as did the piece of State Route 39 from Monterey to Shadwell. By 1935, the whole route west of Richmond became an extension of U.S. Route 250 into Virginia, truncating SR 5 to its present Richmond-Williamsburg route.

SR 5 was extended east along State Route 31 through Williamsburg to State Route 168 (now State Route 143) "to improve the service to travelers interchanging between Route 5 and Routes 60 and 168" in 1958. SR 31 has since been truncated to the SR 5 junction.

== Major intersections ==
| County | Location | mi | km | Destinations | Notes |
|---|---|---|---|---|---|
| City of Richmond | | 0.00 | 0.00 | US 60 west (East Main Street) / 25th Street | Western terminus; west end of US 60 overlap |
| City of Richmond | | 0.30 | 0.48 | US 60 east (Williamsburg Avenue) | East end of US 60 overlap |
| Henrico | Oakland | | | New Osborne Turnpike | former SR 146 north |
| Henrico | | 5.01 | 8.06 | Laburnum Avenue to SR 895 / US 60 | |
| Henrico | | | | Battlefield Park Road – Fort Harrison (Richmond National Battlefield Park) | former SR 156 south |
| Henrico | | 8.35 | 13.44 | I-295 – Washington, Rocky Mount, NC | Exit 22 (I-295) |
| Henrico | | 13.05 | 21.00 | SR 156 north (Willis Church Road) – Seven Pines, Mechanicsville | West end of SR 156 overlap |
| Charles City | | 19.11 | 30.75 | SR 106 / SR 156 south (Roxbury Road) – Hopewell, Prince George, Benjamin Harrison Memorial Bridge | East end of SR 156 overlap |
| Charles City | Charles City | 28.48 | 45.83 | SR 155 north / SR 644 (Courthouse Road) – Providence Forge, Charles City CH | |
| Chickahominy River | | 41.76 | 67.21 | Barrett's Ferry Bridge | |
| James City | | | | SR 5000 east (Monticello Avenue) – Williamsburg | |
| James City | | | | SR 614 (Greensprings Road) – Jamestown | |
| James City | Five Forks | | | SR 615 (Ironbound Road) – Dunbar, Jamestown | |
| James City | | 49.95 | 80.39 | SR 199 west to SR 321 / SR 616 – Williamsburg | West end of SR 199 overlap |
| City of Williamsburg | | 50.41 | 81.13 | SR 31 south (Jamestown Road) / SR 199 east – Newport News, Jamestown, Busch Gardens | East end of SR 199 overlap |
| City of Williamsburg | | 52.34 | 84.23 | SR 132 south (South Henry Street) to SR 199 / Francis Street – Busch Gardens, to Colonial Parkway, William & Mary Law School | West end of SR 132 overlap |
| City of Williamsburg | | 52.72 | 84.84 | SR 132 north (North Henry Street) to I-64 / Lafayette Street – Colonial Williamsburg Visitor Center, Colonial Parkway | East end of SR 132 overlap; former SR 162 west |
| City of Williamsburg | | 53.78 | 86.55 | US 60 east (York Street) / Page Street to Francis Street – Busch Gardens | West end of US 60 overlap |
| City of Williamsburg | | | | Second Street | former SR 162 east |
| City of Williamsburg | | 54.34 | 87.45 | US 60 west (Bypass Road) – Colonial Williamsburg Visitor Center, Colonial Parkway | East end of US 60 overlap |
| City of Williamsburg | | 54.96 | 88.45 | SR 143 (Capitol Landing Road / Merrimac Trail) to I-64 | Eastern terminus |
1.000 mi = 1.609 km; 1.000 km = 0.621 mi: Concurrency terminus

== Road names ==
| Location | Name | Notes |
|---|---|---|
| City of Richmond | E. Main Street | Western terminus |
| Henrico County | Old Osborne Turnpike | |
| Henrico County | Osborne Turnpike | |
| Henrico County | New Market Road | |
| Charles City County | John Tyler Memorial Highway | |
| James City County | John Tyler Memorial Highway | |
| City of Williamsburg | Humelsine Parkway | Concurrency with SR 199 |
| City of Williamsburg | Jamestown Road | |
| City of Williamsburg | S. Boundary Street | |
| City of Williamsburg | W. Francis Street | |
| City of Williamsburg | Henry Street (South/North) | Concurrency with SR 132 |
| City of Williamsburg | Lafayette Street | Old SR 162 alignment |
| City of Williamsburg | Page Street | |
| City of Williamsburg | Capitol Landing Road | Eastern terminus |

| < SR 40 | Two‑digit State Routes; 1923-1933 | SR 42 > |
| none | Spurs of SR 32; 1923–1928 | SR 322 > |
| < SR 834 | District 8 State Routes; 1928–1933 | SR 836 > |
