= Colonial (Amtrak train) =

20th-century American inter-city passenger train

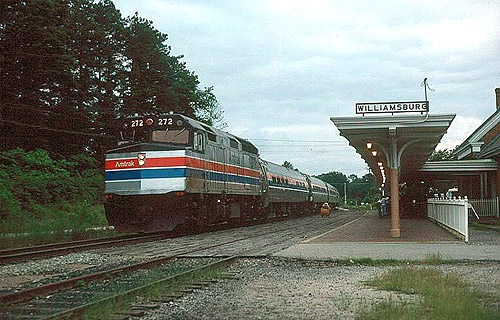
- The Colonial at Williamsburg in July 1978

Overview
- Service type: Inter-city rail
- Status: Merged into Northeast Regional
- Locale: Virginia
- First service: June 15, 1976
- Last service: October 24, 1992
- Former operator: Amtrak

Route
- Termini: Boston South Station; Newport News
- Stops: 24
- Distance travelled: 643 miles (1,035 km)
- Average journey time: 12 hours and 30 minutes
- Service frequency: Daily

Technical
- Rolling stock: Amfleet
- Track gauge: 4 ft 8 1/2 in (1,435 mm)

The Colonial was an Amtrak intercity passenger train that operated between Boston, Massachusetts and Newport News, Virginia from 1976 until 1992. It was introduced on June 15, 1976, to replace the lightly-used Charlottesville-Newport News section of the James Whitcomb Riley. Certain trips were known as the Senator and Tidewater beginning in the late 1970s. The Richmond-New York City Virginian was added in 1984, with some trips called Potomac from 1985 to 1988.

The Colonial was renamed Old Dominion on October 24, 1992, as part of a series of service changes. Several name changes of Virginia service over the next three years created the Chesapeake, Gotham Limited, James River, New England Express, Tidewater Express, and Manhattan Express, and added a second Richmond trip. Virginia service was merged into the NortheastDirect brand in 1995. A second daily round trip was added as the Twilight Shoreliner in 1997. After subsequent service changes, Amtrak service to Newport News continues as part of the Northeast Regional brand.

== History ==
=== Previous service ===
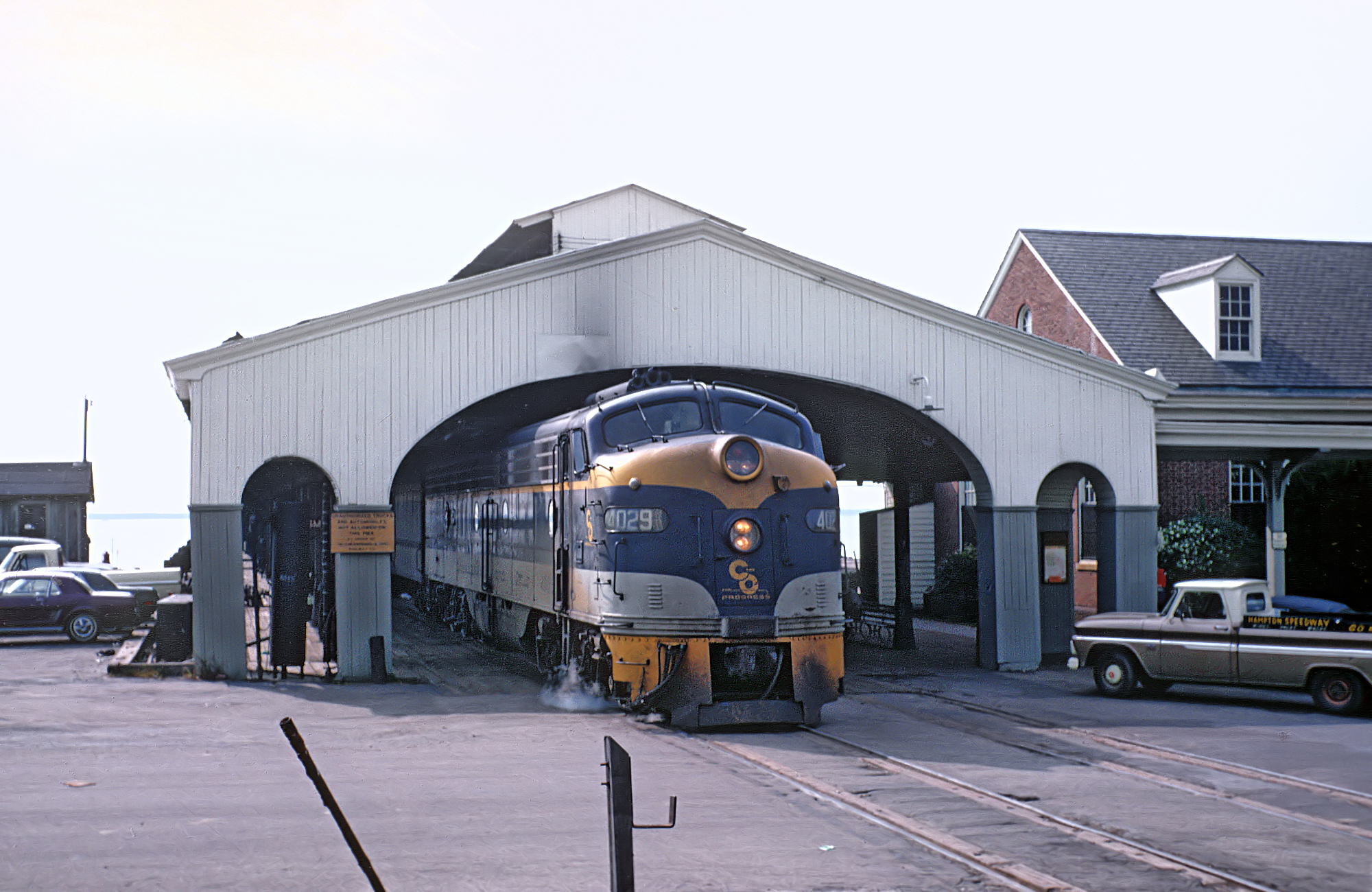
The George Washington at Newport News in 1968

By the time Amtrak took over intercity passenger service in the United States on May 1, 1971, the Chesapeake & Ohio Railway (C&O) served Newport News with three daily round trips: the Charlottesville–Newport News sections of the George Washington and Fast Flying Virginian / Sportsman, plus a Newport News–Richmond trip. Amtrak kept only one daily round trip to Newport News — a section of the Washington–Cincinnati George Washington. The George Washington was combined with the James Whitcomb Riley on July 12, 1971, to provide through service to Chicago.

The Newport News section was lightly used — usually not filling a single coach—and passengers between the Tidewater region and the Northeast had to transfer at Charlottesville. The March 25, 1975 introduction of the Chicago–Norfolk Mountaineer satisfied a federal mandate for Amtrak to provide service between Cincinnati and the Tidewater. Following studies that indicated a market for direct service between the Tidewater and the Northeast, Amtrak replaced the Riley section with the New York City–Newport News Colonial on June 15, 1976. The Colonial served as an extension of the southbound Mount Vernon (which was already called Colonial on Saturdays) and the northbound Betsy Ross. It used new Amfleet coaches, unlike the aging ex-C&O passenger cars used on the Riley.

=== Service changes ===
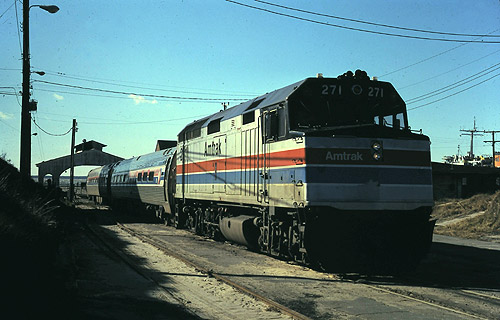
The Tidewater at Newport News in 1978

Initially, the Colonial ran between Newport News and New York City, except for the Saturday southbound train which originated in Boston. On February 15, 1977, all Colonial service was extended to Boston. Northbound Sunday service changed on May 1, 1977: the Colonial began to originate at Richmond, while the several-hours-later Senator originated at Newport News. A stop at Lee Hall was added on October 30, 1977. Beginning on July 30, 1978, northbound Sunday service became the Newport News-New York City Tidewater, and the Senator returned to its previous schedule. On January 4, 1987, the northbound Colonial collided with Conrail locomotives in Maryland, killing fourteen passengers and two Amtrak employees.

By the early 1980s, Richmond was served by the Colonial/Tidewater plus three long-distance trains—the Palmetto, Silver Meteor, and Silver Star. Because the long-distance trains frequently ran late, only the Colonial/Tidewater provided reliable northbound service from Richmond, Fredericksburg, and Quantico. On October 28, 1984, Amtrak added the daily Richmond–New York Virginian, which was timed to allow commuting to Washington. On April 28, 1985, the northbound Sunday Virginian was moved two hours later as the Potomac. The Potomac was discontinued on September 15, 1988; the Colonial began running from Richmond to Boston on Sundays, with the Tidewater continuing to provide Sunday northbound service from Newport News. The April 1990 extension of one Atlantic City Express train to Richmond and the April 1991 separation of the New York–Charlotte Carolinian from the Palmetto increased Washington-Richmond service to seven daily round trips.

=== Later service ===
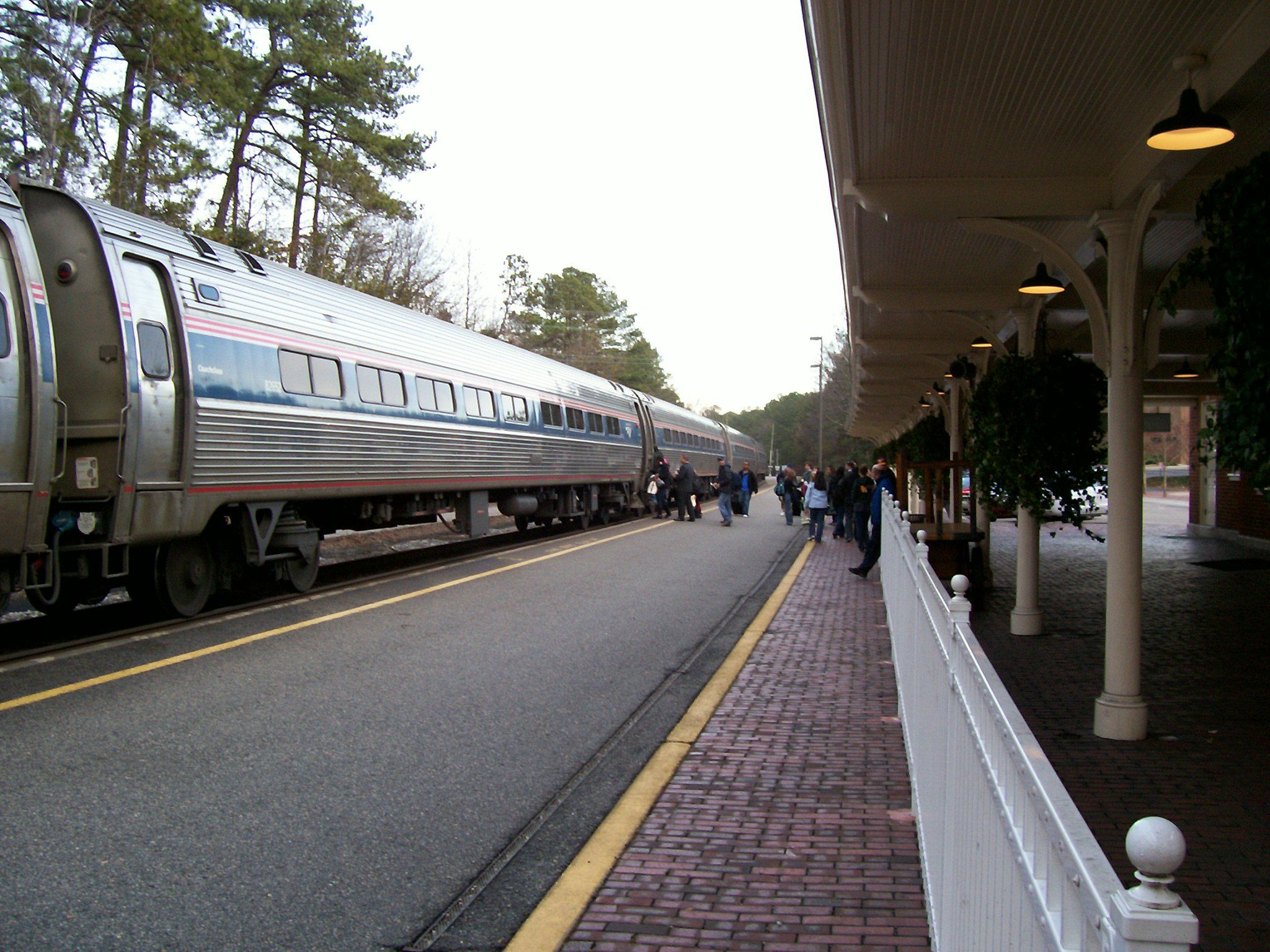
A Regional at Williamsburg in 2008

Amtrak made a series of changes to corridor service in Virginia beginning on 1992. On October 25, 1992, both the Virginian and Colonial were cut back from Boston to New York City, and the latter was renamed Old Dominion. A Friday Tidewater round trip was also added. May 2, 1993 saw the additional of Tidewater round trips on Thursday and Saturday southbound / Sunday northbound, plus a southbound-only Sunday trip from Richmond to Newport News. A station stop was added at Williamsburg Pottery Factory. Service levels of the added weekend round trips were adjusted the next February. The southbound weekend Virginian became the Chesapeake on May 1, 1994, with the northbound weekend Old Dominion in turn renamed Virginian. On October 30, 1994, the Sunday Richmond–Newport News trip and a late Friday Newport News-Richmond move (a former deadhead move) were called the James River.

Amtrak began showing Virginia services as part of Northeast Corridor timetables on April 2, 1995. The Old Dominion and Virginian were renamed New England Express and the Lee Hall stop was dropped. A daily Richmond–New York City round trip — the southbound Chesapeake made daily and a new northbound Old Dominion — was added to replace the discontinued Amtrak City Express. On September 10, 1995, the northbound New England Express was renamed Tidewater Express (except for a single Sunday trip from Springfield, which became the Old Dominion), and the northbound Old Dominion was replaced with the Manhattan Express. On October 28, 1995, most of Amtrak's Northeast Corridor services (except for the premium Metroliners and commuter-based Clockers), including the Richmond and Newport News trains, were rebranded as NortheastDirect and lost their individual names.

Train names were re-added under the NortheastDirect brand the next year. The daily Newport News train became the Old Dominion, with Tidewater, Virginian, James River, and Potomac assigned to other trips. The daily Richmond trains became the Virginian and the Bay State, the latter of which ran to Boston via Springfield and the Inland Route. The Williamsburg Pottery Factory stop was also discontinued in 1996. On July 10, 1997, the Washington–Boston Night Owl was replaced by the Newport News–Boston Twilight Shoreliner, providing a second daily round trip to Newport News. The Bay State was cut back to Washington and replaced by the Springfield–Richmond Charter Oak, and the Potomac was renamed Gotham Limited. On October 26, 1997, the Chesapeake was cut to New York and renamed Colonial. NortheastDirect trains except for the Twilight Shoreliner again lost their individual names on May 16, 1999. The NortheastDirect brand — including the Virginia trains — was renamed Acela Regional in 2000–2001, Regional in 2003, and finally Northeast Regional in 2008. Virginia began funding further expansion of Northeast Regional service in 2009.
