= Williamsburg Transportation Center =

Intermodal transportation hub in Williamsburg, Virginia

Williamsburg, VA
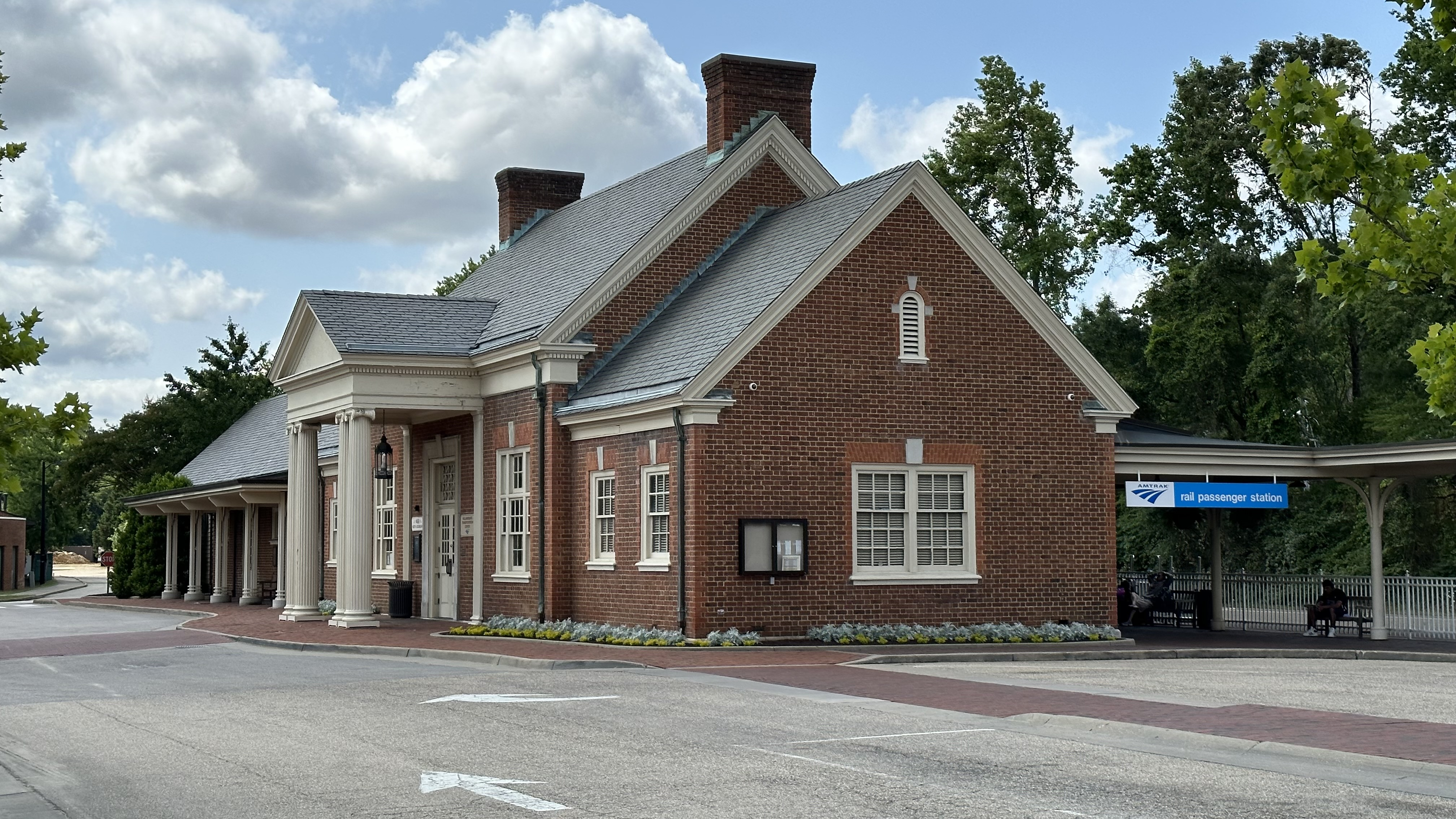
- The Williamsburg Transportation Center in June 2023.

General information
- Location: 468 North Boundary Street; Williamsburg, Virginia; United States
- Coordinates: 37°16′32″N 76°42′28″W
- Line: CSX Peninsula Subdivision
- Platforms: 1 side platform
- Tracks: 1
- Connections: Greyhound Lines; Hampton Roads Transit: 921; Williamsburg Area Transit Authority: Blue, Grey, Orange, Red, Tan, Jamestown

Construction
- Parking: Yes
- Accessible: Yes

Other information
- Station code: Amtrak: WBG
- IATA code: ZWB

History
- Opened: 1935

Passengers
- FY 2025: 74,190 (Amtrak)

Services
Preceding station	Amtrak	Following station
Newport News Terminus	Northeast Regional	Richmond–Main Street toward Boston South or Springfield
Former services
Preceding station	Amtrak	Following station
Newport News Terminus	Northeast Regional (1981-2024)	Richmond–Main Street toward Boston South or Springfield
Newport News Terminus	Twilight Shoreliner	Richmond Staples Mill Road toward Boston South
Newport News Terminus	James Whitcomb Riley until 1976	Richmond–Ellerson toward Chicago
Lee Hall toward Newport News	Colonial 1976-1992	Richmond–Main Street toward Boston South
Lee Hall toward Newport News	George Washington to 1974	Richmond–Main Street toward Chicago
Preceding station	Chesapeake and Ohio Railway	Following station
Norge toward Cincinnati	Main Line	Grove toward Phoebus
Location

Williamsburg Transportation Center is an intermodal transit station in Williamsburg, Virginia. Operated by the Williamsburg Area Transit Authority, it also serves Amtrak's Northeast Regional train as well as Greyhound Lines and Hampton Roads Transit intercity buses. The transportation center was formerly a Chesapeake and Ohio Railway (C&O) passenger station.

== History ==
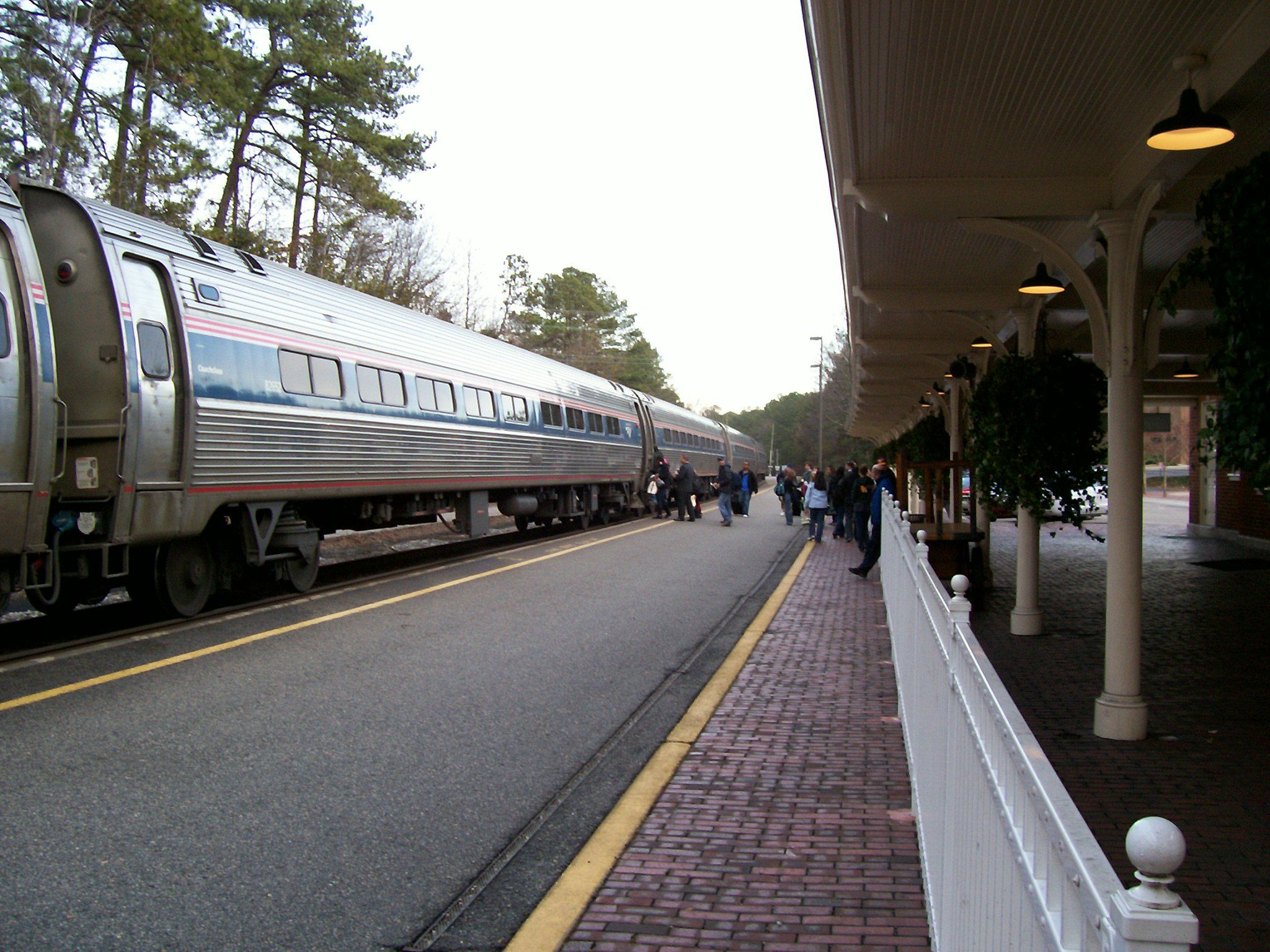
Northeast Regional at the station, February 2008

In 1873, the Chesapeake and Ohio Railway (C&O) line led by Collis P. Huntington had connected Richmond with the Ohio River Valley at Huntington, West Virginia. In 1881, the Peninsula Extension of the Chesapeake and Ohio Railway brought the line east to the new city of Newport News. Williamsburg initially allowed tracks to be placed down the main street of town, Duke of Gloucester Street, and even directly through the ruins of the historic capitol building. As regular service was established, the main line was soon relocated slightly north.

Williamsburg's original station was replaced in 1907 with a brick structure, in conjunction with the tercentenary of Jamestown. Then in 1935, the 1907 station was replaced with the present station building with funding from John D. Rockefeller Jr.

C&O passenger service to Williamsburg was replaced in 1971 by Amtrak.

== Station layout ==
The station is served by two Amtrak trains a day in each direction, with direct service to Newport News, Richmond, and points along the Northeast Corridor from Washington DC through New York City to Boston. Intercity bus service is provided by Greyhound Lines (Carolina Trailways), Hampton Roads Transit (HRT) and the Williamsburg Area Transit Authority.
