= Williamsburg Area Transit Authority =

Transit service in Williamsburg, Virginia

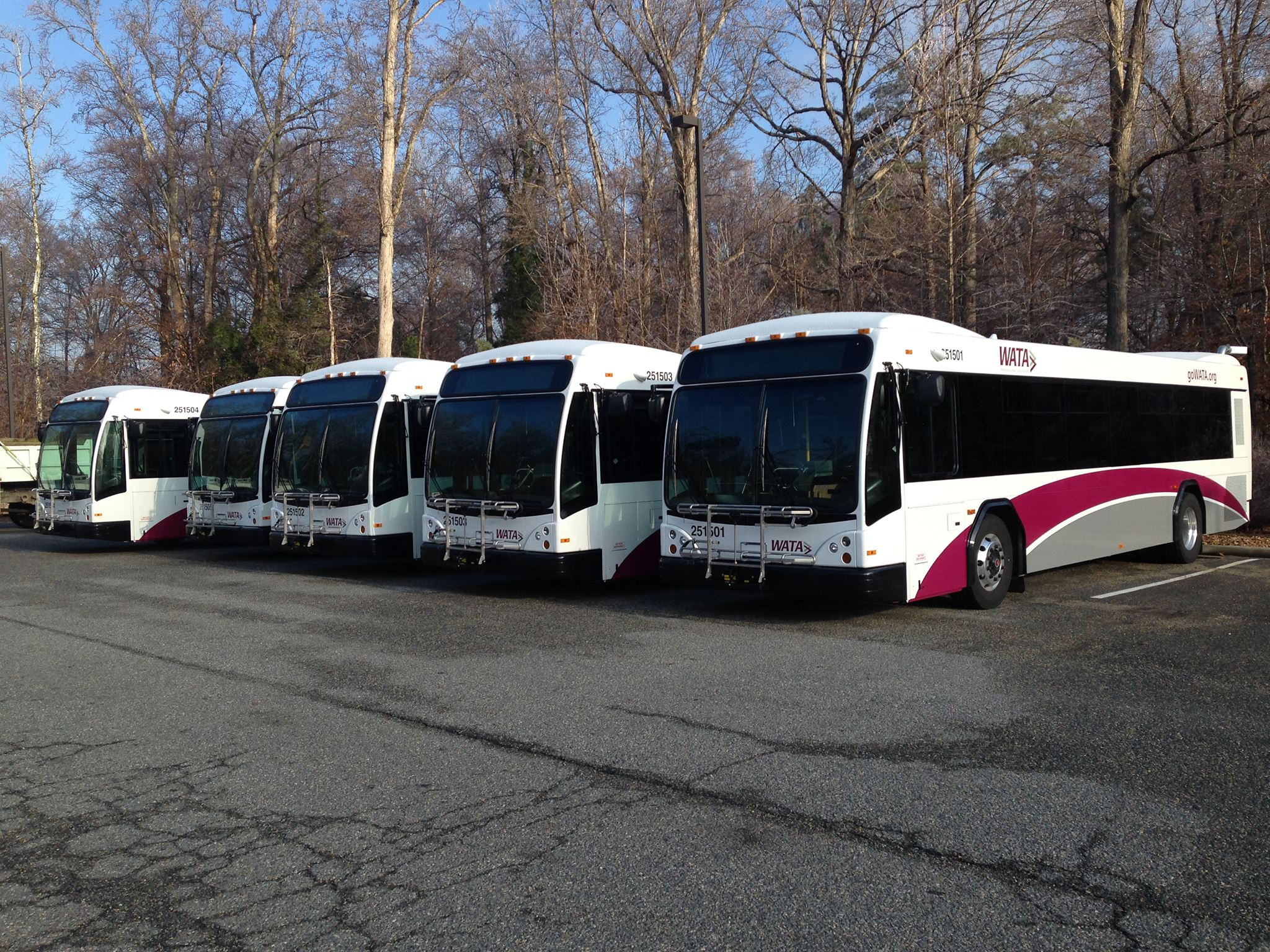
- Founded: 1977 as James City County Transit
- Headquarters: 7239 Pocahontas Trail; Williamsburg, VA
- Locale: Historic Triangle
- Service area: City of Williamsburg, James City County, York County, Surry County
- Service type: bus service
- Routes: 13
- Destinations: Colonial Williamsburg; Busch Gardens Williamsburg; College of William and Mary; New Town Williamsburg; Jamestown Settlement; Water Country USA; Great Wolf Lodge
- Hubs: Williamsburg Transportation Center, Walmart store in Lightfoot
- Fleet: Bus: 20, Trolley: 2
- Daily ridership: 5,100 (weekdays, Q2 2026)
- Annual ridership: 1,521,000 (2025)
- Fuel type: Diesel
- Executive Director: Matthew Scalia
- Website: www.gowata.org

Williamsburg Area Transit Authority (WATA) is a multi-jurisdiction transportation agency providing transit bus and ADA Paratransit services in the City of Williamsburg, James City County, and York County in the Historic Triangle area.

WATA operates 13 bus routes, using a "hub and spoke" style system using the intermodal Williamsburg Transportation Center and the Rochambeau Drive Walmart as hubs. Additionally, connections are available to multiple Hampton Roads Transit (HRT) routes at Lee Hall. In 2025, the system had a ridership of 1,521,000, or about 5,100 per weekday as of the second quarter of 2026.

== History ==
Williamsburg Area Transit Authority (WATA) is the successor to James City County Transit (JCCT), and Williamsburg Area Transport (WAT). JCCT began in 1977 as a James City County Social Services transportation system using flexible routes to serve those needing it most. The successful service grew into a public bus system serving multiple jurisdictions and the organization became Williamsburg Area Transport which was also governmentally operated by James City County in the community for many years. In the early 21st century, by changing from being known as James City County Transit to the newer name of "Williamsburg Area Transport", the scope and area of the current regional services were more accurately described as part of a new organizational structure authorized by the Virginia General Assembly. In 2006, Williamsburg Area Transport grew into the first Virginia "transit authority" branded as "Williamsburg Area Transit Authority".

Bus stop sign from the Williamsburg Area Transport era.

WATA services are operated within the City of Williamsburg, James City County, and the Bruton District of York County, serving citizens and visitors to all four localities. Historic sites and extensive tourism form the basis for an unusual operating environment in comparison to similar sized localities elsewhere in Virginia and the United States.

To help mitigate rush hour traffic and new delays due to heightened security measures on the Jamestown Ferry crossing the James River, in October 2007, WATA began Deviated route transit bus service from 5 stops in Surry County across the James River to limited stops at several major points in James City County and Williamsburg, terminating at the Williamsburg Transportation Center where connections are available with other WATA, HRT, and intercity services.

In 2011, WATA expanded its services to include a storefront location in the Williamsburg Outlet Mall on Richmond Road. The center acts as a hub for public information and waiting areas for passengers, and eventually included ticket and bus fare sales. The storefront location was moved to the Williamsburg Transportation Center in January 2014 due to the closing of the Outlet Mall. This change also coincided with the western hub moving to the Lightfoot Walmart store. Routes serving the Outlet Mall were modified to reflect the hub change, as well as extend service further out in Toano.

In January 2015, WATA began a 3-year pilot route in the Jamestown area. The new Route 6: Jamestown route serves Jamestown Road, Jamestown Settlement, Greensprings Road, John Tyler Highway and travels on Rt. 199 back to Jamestown Rd.

In June 2016 WATA proposed several changes to its routes and schedules to improve service. Several hearings were held to solicit public input on the changes. The proposed changes went into effect in October 2016. Among the schedule changes were the hours of 30-minute frequency service from 6:30am–9:30am and 3:30pm–6:30pm on weekdays. Routes 1 and 2 would also extend their hours to 11pm. Frequency service ended on Route 7: Mooretown route, reverting it to hourly service only. Route 6 (Jamestown) added service to the Williamsburg Transportation Center via Jamestown Rd, and service along Greensprings Rd was discontinued. Route 13 was also modified to terminate at Jamestown Settlement, requiring riders to connect to route 6 to continue towards downtown.

Route 13 was discontinued in 2021 due to low ridership and a lack of funding from Surry County.

In June 2024, WATA's board of directors approved a new transit strategic plan outlining service improvements over the next decade. Planned changes include 30 minute all-day frequencies on routes 1 and 2 in January 2026, increased frequencies and routing changes on routes 3, 7, and 11 in 2028, and 15 minute all-day service on route 12 in 2030.

In April 2025, WATA broke ground on a new northern transportation center which will replace the existing transfer at the Rochambeau Shopping Center Walmart. It is expected to be completed by September 2026.

== Fares ==
As of November 15, 2025, the one-way fare is $1.50 on all routes, or $3.00 for an all-day pass. There are also weekly and monthly passes. Tickets can be purchased onboard, or at the WATA customer service counter at the Transportation Center.

On February 3rd, 2025, WATA announced the addition of mobile ticketing through the Transit App. Riders are able purchase a ticket in the app, and then scan their phone on the onboard fare validator.

The College of William & Mary and WATA currently have an agreement that allows students, staff, and faculty members to ride any route for free by showing a valid William & Mary ID card.

== Routes ==
As of November 2025, WATA operates 12 fixed routes, not including the seasonal Yorktown Trolley. Each route typically operates from 6AM to 9PM Mon - Sat, and 8AM to 6PM on Sundays with 60 minute headways, unless otherwise specified. WATA operates on a reduced schedule on most James City County holidays. There is no service on Thanksgiving Day, Christmas Day, and New Years Day.

Route	Terminals		Additional Major Stops	Service	Notes
1 Lee Hall	Williamsburg Transportation Center	Lee Hall	Busch Gardens; Riverside Doctor's Hospital	Operates on a 30 min frequency Mon - Fri	Timed connection to Hampton Roads Transit routes 108 and 112 at Lee Hall
2 Richmond Rd	Williamsburg Transportation Center	E Rochambeau Dr. at Walmart	William & Mary; Williamsburg Premium Outlets	Operates on a 30 min frequency Mon - Fri	
3 Merrimac Trail	Williamsburg Transportation Center	Merrimac Trail at Tam-O-Shanter Blvd	Colonial Williamsburg Visitors Center; Marquis Shopping Center		
4 Longhill Rd	New Town	E Rochambeau Dr. at Walmart	Lightfoot Marketplace; James City County Human Services Building		
5 Monticello	Williamsburg Transportation Center	Williamsburg Crossing Shopping Center	William & Mary; New Town; Williamsburg-James City County Courthouse		On Nov 14th, 2022, Route 12 replaced Route 5 service on Treyburn and Ironbound roads, and Monticello Avenue west of SR 199
6 Jamestown	Williamsburg Transportation Center	Jamestown Settlement	William & Mary; Williamsburg Crossing Shopping Center		
7 Mooretown Rd	Williamsburg Transportation Center	E Rochambeau Dr. at Walmart	Sentara Williamsburg Regional Medical Center; Great Wolf Lodge		
8 W&M	Marshall-Wythe School of Law	William & Mary School of Education	Kaplan Arena	Operates on a 30 minute frequency; Extended weekday hours (until 11:00PM); No weekend service	Operates as a shuttle service on the College of William and Mary campus; Free to ride
9 Toano	Storehouse Commerce Park	E Rochambeau Dr. at Walmart	Norge; Croaker Public Library		Serves Williamsburg Pottery Factory, Croaker public library, Burnt Ordinary Apartments, and Norge
11 Lackey	Barham Blvd at Rivermeade	Riverside Doctors Hospital	Quarterpath; Lackey Clinic; Yorktown Naval Weapons Station; James City County Government Complex	Operates on a 90 min frequency; 6:00AM - 7:30PM Mon - Sat; No Sunday service	Began service in July 2017 to Lackey Clinic, Riverside Hospital, Virginia Peninsula Regional Jail (VPRJ), Naval Weapons Station, and the JCC Government Complex
12 Ironbound	Williamsburg Transportation Center	Steeplechase Apartments		Operates on a 30 min frequency Mon - Sat	Began service on November 14th, 2022 replacing existing segments of Route 5 along Treyburn Rd, Ironbound Rd, and Monticello Ave; Route 12 was originally split into two service patterns: Route 12, which terminated at Monticello Marketplace, and Route 12A which terminated at Steeplechase. The two were later consolidated into a singular route
15 Colonial	Williamsburg Transportation Center	Merchants Square		Operates on a 15 minute frequency in a clockwise loop; 9:00AM - 9:00PM Mon - Sat; 9:00AM - 6:00PM Sun	Began service on September 10th, 2023 replacing the former Colonial Williamsburg shuttle system; Free to ride

== Fleet ==
- New Flyer Xcelsior XD40 Diesel
- New Flyer XD35 Diesel
- Gillig Low Floor 30’, 35’, 40’
- Gillig Low Floor BRT 35' Clean Diesel

All buses are equipped with two-way radio communications and on-board ITS system with an emergency alarm. All buses are equipped with surveillance video on the interior and exterior for safety.

== Accessibility ==
All buses are fully ADA accessible. Paratransit service is provided to eligible individuals not able to use the accessible fixed route bus system.

== Williamsburg Trolley ==
In May 2008, Williamsburg Area Transit Authority announced that it had recently received a grant for three trolley-replica type buses that will serve the local shopping areas of New Town, High Street, Richmond Road, Jamestown Road, and Merchants Square in Colonial Williamsburg. The Williamsburg Trolley began service in August 2009. The event was marked with a ribbon-cutting ceremony at New Town. The trolley ran every day except on New Year's Day, Thanksgiving Day, and Christmas Day. Each of the trolleys featured ornamental wooden seating, a cheerful, two-toned red and blue exterior and bicycle racks. On warm days, the trolley had an open-air atmosphere. Trolley drivers pointed out historic sites, restaurants, and must-visit attractions.

The Williamsburg Trolley was discontinued during the COVID-19 pandemic due to low ridership.
