= Newport News station =

Former Amtrak inter-city train station in Newport News, Virginia

Newport News, VA
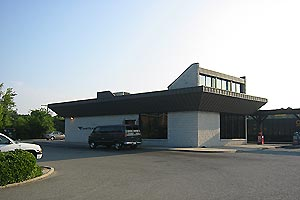
- Newport News station building, June 2007

General information
- Location: 9304 Warwick Boulevard; Newport News, Virginia; United States
- Coordinates: 37.0228°N 76.4519°W
- Owner: Amtrak, CSX and Newport News Parking Authority
- Line: CSX Peninsula Subdivision
- Platforms: 1 side platform
- Tracks: 1
- Connections: Amtrak Thruway; Hampton Roads Transit: 106, 107

Construction
- Parking: Yes
- Accessible: Yes

Other information
- Station code: Amtrak: NPN
- IATA code: ZWW

History
- Opened: October 1981
- Closed: August 2024

Passengers
- FY 2025: 109,799 (Amtrak)

Former services
Preceding station	Amtrak	Following station
Terminus	Northeast Regional	Williamsburg toward Boston South or Springfield
Terminus	Twilight Shoreliner 1997-2003	Williamsburg toward Boston South
Terminus	Colonial 1976-1992	Lee Hall toward Boston South
Services at pre-1981 station
Preceding station	Amtrak	Following station
Terminus	James Whitcomb Riley until 1976	Lee Hall toward Chicago
Terminus	James Whitcomb Riley and George Washington until 1974	Lee Hall toward Chicago
Preceding station	Chesapeake and Ohio Railway	Following station
Morrison toward Cincinnati	Main Line	Hampton toward Washington, D.C. or Phoebus
Location

Newport News station was an Amtrak inter-city train station in Newport News, Virginia. When it closed, it was the southern terminus of two daily Northeast Regional round trips. It has a single side platform adjacent to a large CSX rail yard. An Amtrak Thruway motorcoach connection to Norfolk station effectively doubles the frequency between each station and Washington. It was replaced by the Newport News Transportation Center.

== History ==
=== Chesapeake & Ohio ===
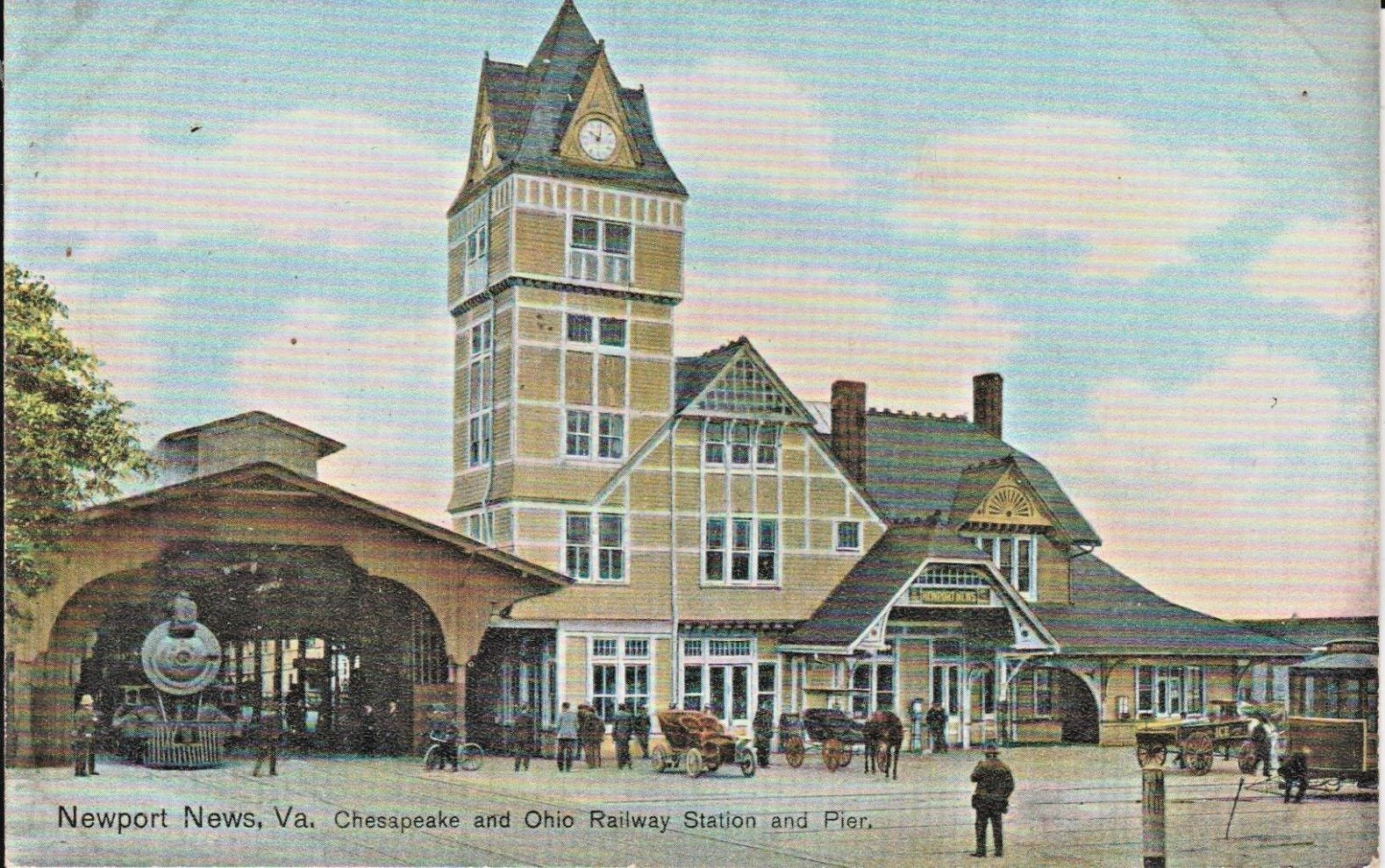
Early postcard of the 1892-built station

The Chesapeake and Ohio Railway (C&O) under Collis Potter Huntington completed the Peninsula Extension to the small town of Newport News in 1881. This allowed the C&O to transport West Virginia coal to Hampton Roads – the largest warm-water port on the East Coast – and directly compete with the Norfolk and Western Railway. Between the coal exports and Huntington's Newport News Shipbuilding Company, Newport News soon became a major shipping and industrial area.

Ferry service between Norfolk and Newport News began in 1883, though the first passenger train station at Newport News was not built until 1892. The multi-story brick structure, Victorian with a large clock tower, was built on the waterfront at 23rd Street. A train shed stretched onto a pier so that passengers could transfer directly between trains and ferries.

By the 1930s, the station was in poor shape, having settled significantly due to the soft soil. It was demolished in 1940 and replaced with a smaller two-story brick station. The new station was constructed on a concrete base 1 foot (0.30 m) above the 1933 Chesapeake–Potomac hurricane flood level, and its pilings were driven 90 feet (27 m) underground to prevent settling.

Between 1953 and 1954, the C&O stopped using Phoebus, Virginia to the east as the terminus of its Norfolk/Hampton Roads area passenger trains. The company shifted that terminus, by then being for the George Washington and other passenger trains, to Newport News station.

When Amtrak took over intercity passenger service in the United States on May 1, 1971, the C&O had served Newport News with three daily round trips: the Newport News sections of the George Washington and Fast Flying Virginian/Sportsman, plus a Newport News-Richmond trip.

=== Amtrak ===
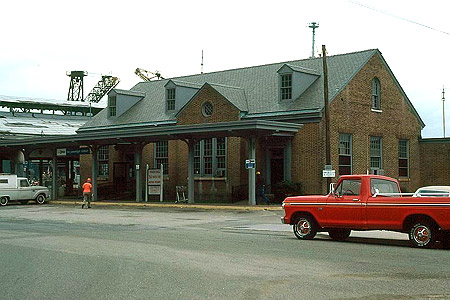
The 1940-built station in 1978

Amtrak kept only one daily round trip to Newport News – a section of the Newport News-Cincinnati George Washington. It was combined with the James Whitcomb Riley on July 12, 1971, to provide through service to Chicago. The George Washington name was used for the eastbound section until May 19, 1974. On June 14, 1976, the Newport News section of the Riley was replaced with the Washington-Newport News Colonial.

Ferry service had been replaced by buses through the Hampton Roads Bridge–Tunnel upon its 1957 opening, making the waterfront location less desirable for a train station. The station was moved to its current location along the CSX line in October 1981. The 1940-built station remains standing and now serves as a restaurant.

Service was reduced to one daily round trip from 2020 to July 11, 2022.

=== Replacement ===
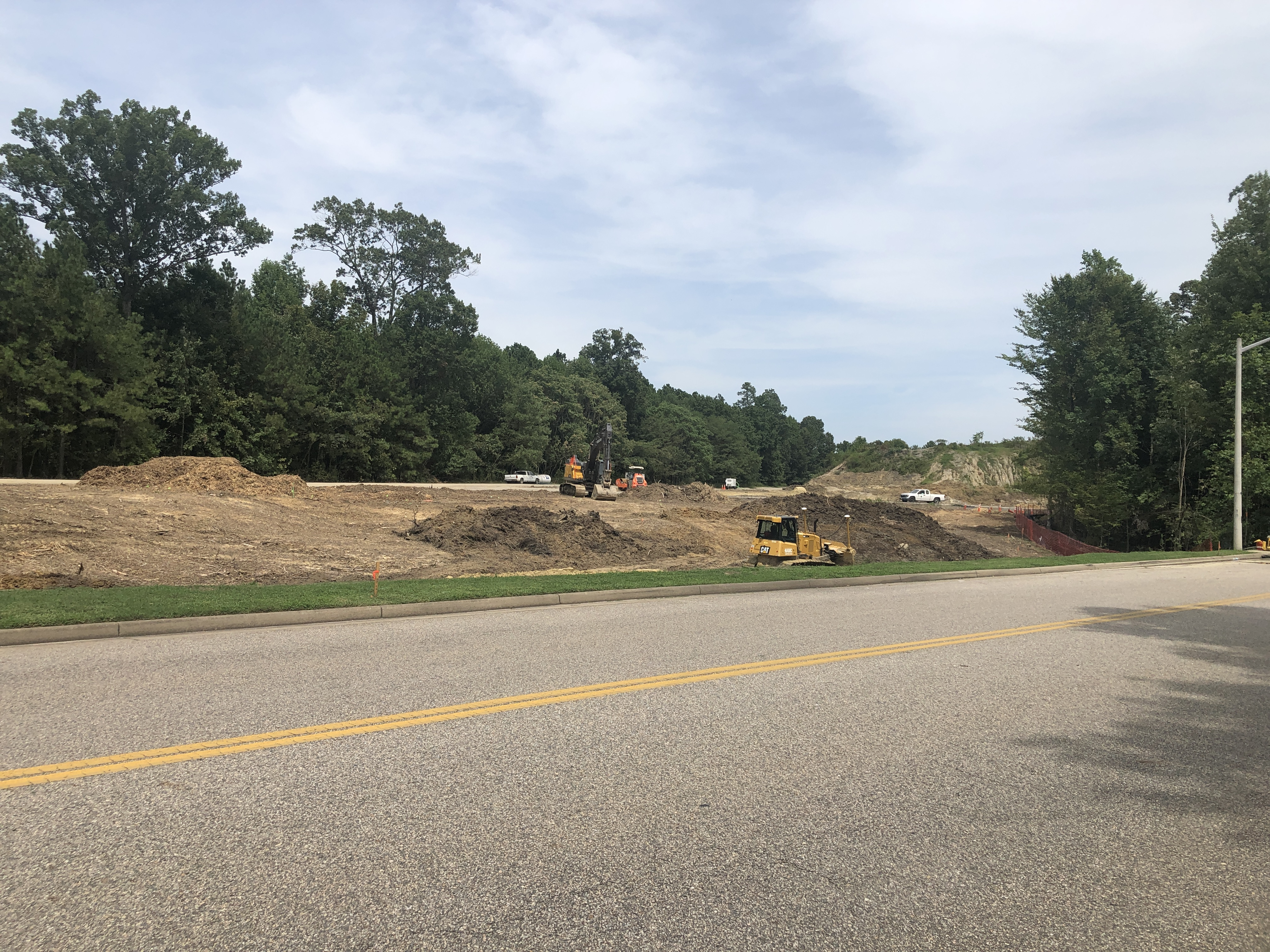
Future Amtrak station under construction near the airport

The current facility was planned to be replaced with two new stations—a large intermodal station near the Newport News/Williamsburg International Airport and a smaller station in downtown Newport News. The city planned to begin design work for the larger station in the summer of 2011, for an opening sometime before 2016. Construction for the new intermodal station near the airport began in July 2020. The project will cost $47 million and was originally expected to be completed by the summer of 2022. Amtrak service to the new station started on August 22, 2024.

A third Northeast Regional weekday round trip is planned, as of 2020, under a major spending initiative by the Virginia Department of Rail and Public Transportation.
