= Carl Martin Bergh =

Norwegian-American businessman (1849–1906)

- Born: December 22, 1849; Søndre Land, Norway
- Died: June 15, 1906 (aged 56)
- Occupations: Businessman, land agent
- Known for: Founding Norge, Virginia
- Spouse: Kari Bergh

Carl Martin Bergh (December 22, 1849 – June 15, 1906) was a Norwegian-American immigrant who is most associated with the resettlement of fellow Scandinavian families to the area of James City County and York County surrounding the community of Norge, Virginia.

== Background ==
Carl M. Bergh was born in Søndre Land Municipality in Christians amt (county), Norway and was raised in York, Green County, Wisconsin. His wife Kari (1849–1917) was also born in Norway. He had operated a masonry and plaster business in Minnesota and Wisconsin for several years, and had farmed in Kansas and Tennessee for 15 years before coming to Virginia as a land agent for the Chesapeake and Ohio Railway (C&O).

== Norge, Virginia ==
Bergh felt that the availability of good farm land at reasonable prices and the temperate climate in eastern Virginia would be attractive to Scandinavians who had settled in northern and Midwestern states, as he was aware of their problems with the difficult winters there. He printed and distributed brochures in English, Norwegian, and German describing the climates and opportunities in James City County, Virginia, purchasing a home for his own family in 1896. Around 1902 Bergh purchased the remaining foundation of the former Farmville Plantation Manor House, originally built around 1800, but which had burned in the 1890s. He built a large Victorian farm house on the remains, which still stands at the end of Farmville Lane in Norge and is privately owned.

Beginning in 1898, immigrant Norwegians, Swedes and Danes came to Norge from the Midwest, especially the states of Michigan, Wisconsin, Iowa, Minnesota, and North Dakota. Most arrived by train on the C&O, whose nearest station was located at Toano, several miles west. Assisted by Jens B. Jenson (1851–1914), a town was laid out which included a Lutheran church, blacksmith shop, sawmill, cabinet shop, and grist mill as well as homes and two stores. After some debate, it was named Norge.

Carl Martin Bergh died in 1906; he fell into a hotel air well and suffered severe head injuries, and his body was discovered four days later. He was buried at Our Saviours Evangelical Lutheran Church Cemetery in Norge.

Carl M. Bergh's son, Alfred Bergh, established the Bergh Hotel which opened in 1906. In 1908, the railroad built a station at Norge. Later generations of many other early families now populate Norge, nearby Croaker, and western James City County, as well as the Lightfoot area which includes land in both James City and York Counties.

== Other sources ==
- Bradshaw, Nancy Smith and Frances Huckstep Hamilton. (1989) Velkommen til Norge: A Pictorial History of Norge, Virginia (Taylor Publishing Company)
- McCartney, Martha W. (1977) James City County: Keystone of the Commonwealth (James City County, Virginia: Donning and Company) ISBN 0-89865-999-X
- Traser, Donald R. (1998) Virginia Railway Depots. Old Dominion Chapter, National Railway Historical Society. ISBN 0-9669906-0-9
