= Newport News Transportation Center =

Amtrak inter-city train station and intermodal transport hub in Newport News, Virginia

Newport News, VA
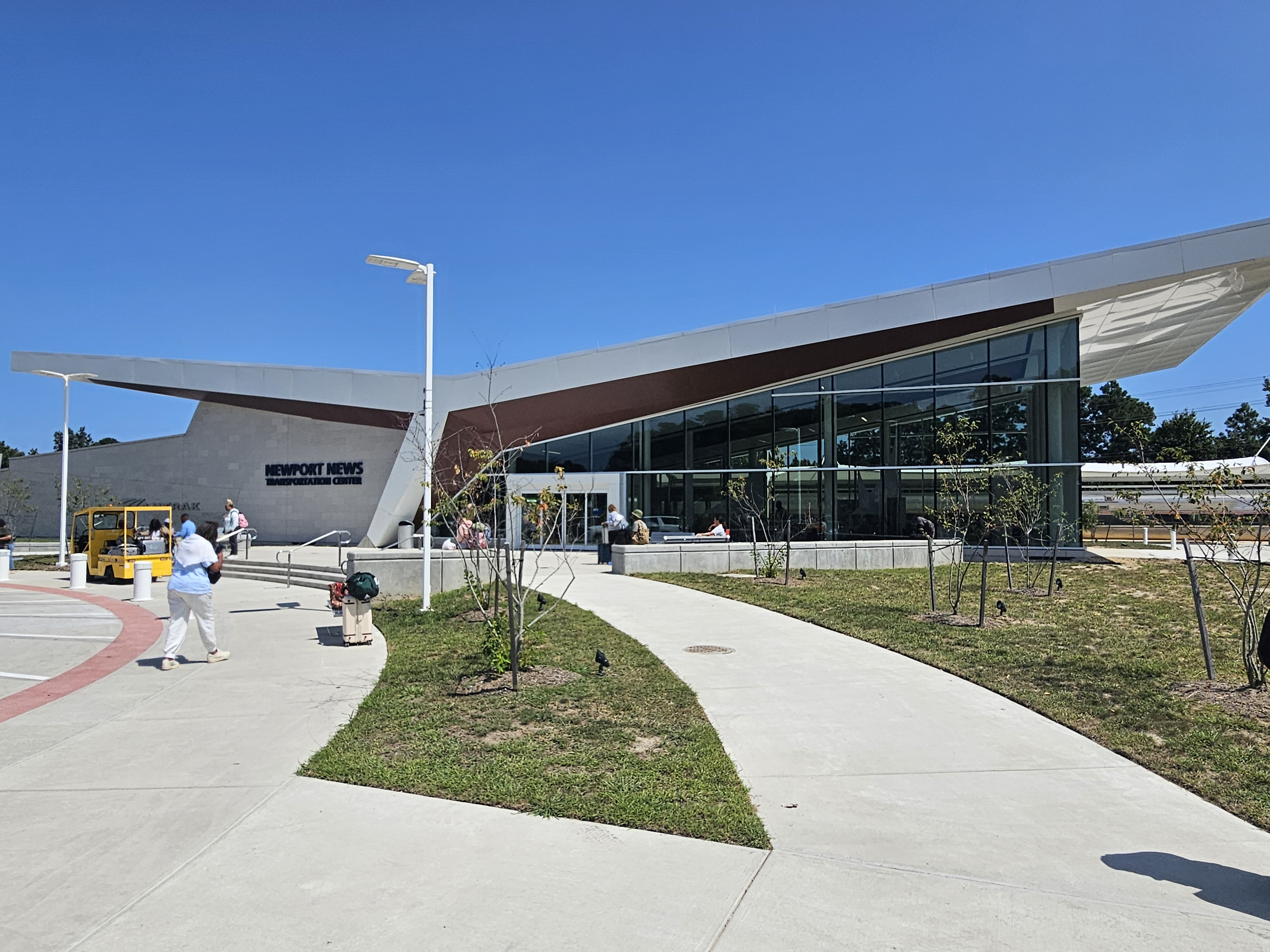
- The station in August 2024

General information
- Location: 500 Bland Boulevard; Newport News, Virginia; United States
- Coordinates: 37.1230°N 76.5185°W
- Owner: Amtrak, CSX, and Newport News Parking Authority
- Line: CSX Peninsula Subdivision
- Platforms: 1 side platform
- Tracks: 1
- Connections: Amtrak Thruway; Hampton Roads Transit: 108; Virginia Breeze: Tidewater Current

Construction
- Parking: Yes
- Accessible: Yes
- Architect: Niles Bolton Associates

Other information
- Station code: Amtrak: NPN

History
- Opened: August 22, 2024

Passengers
- FY 2025: 109,799 (Amtrak)

Services
Preceding station	Amtrak	Following station
Terminus	Northeast Regional	Williamsburg toward Boston South or Springfield
Location

The Newport News Transportation Center is an Amtrak inter-city train station and intermodal transport hub in Newport News, Virginia. The station is located about one mile (1.6 km) from Newport News/Williamsburg International Airport on Bland Boulevard between Warwick Boulevard and Interstate 64.

The station was constructed to consolidate all of the region's public transport entities into one location and serve as the new southern terminus of the two daily round trips on the Virginia Peninsula branch of the Northeast Regional, which previously terminated at the old Newport News station located nine miles (14 km) to the south. An Amtrak Thruway motorcoach connection to Norfolk station effectively doubles the frequency between each station and Washington. A second, smaller station in downtown Newport News was also proposed but has been indefinitely postponed. The station has a high platform with space for eight cars.

== History ==
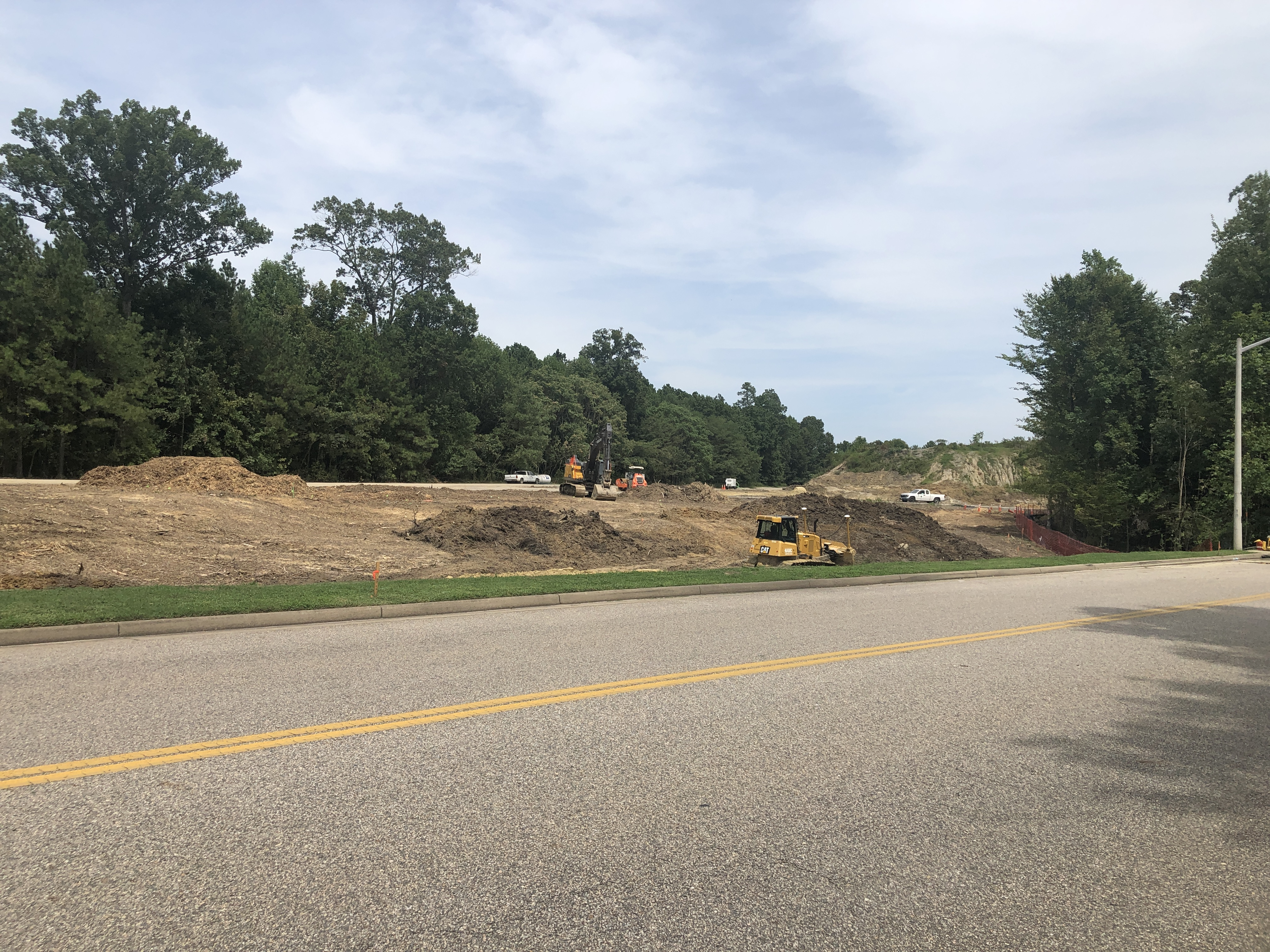
The station under construction on August 19, 2020

The old Newport News station was planned to be replaced with two new stations—a large intermodal station near Newport News/Williamsburg International Airport and a smaller station in downtown Newport News.

The construction of the new station was necessary because the current 30-year-old station has a limited parking area, is inaccessible for people with physical disabilities, and has poor connectivity with local public transport services.

The station will be more energy-efficient and allow Amtrak to turn around trains more efficiently and maintain trains on-site. This would both increase ridership and decrease costs. The city planned to begin design work for the larger station in the summer of 2011, for an opening sometime before 2016. As of 2011, the cost was estimated at $24 million.

As of January 3, 2019, the project was in the planning phase for six years, having initially been planned to open in October 2018. On March 14, 2019, the project was further delayed until 2021, with the plans for the new downtown station dropped and the intermodal station to serve as the new terminus. Construction for the new intermodal station near the airport began on July 21, 2020. The project will cost $47 million and was originally expected to be completed by the summer of 2022. However, the city of Newport News announced on October 10, 2022, that the new station would not be open until the fall of 2023, citing unexpected construction delays. On March 16, 2023, a further delay to April 2024 due to supply chain issues was announced. On February 26, 2024, the expected opening date was pushed back to May or June 2024, with the project costing a total of $53 million. An additional delay to the fall to allow for the completion of construction and Amtrak's station testing process was announced on July 2, although the project remains on budget. The station finally opened on August 22.

In addition to the station building, the project included the station building, new tracks, a wye north of the station for turning trains around, and a small maintenance facility south of the station for servicing and cleaning trains before the next day's departures.

A third Northeast Regional weekday round trip is planned to begin in 2026 under a major expansion plan by the Virginia Passenger Rail Authority.

The Virginia Breeze's Tidewater Current intercity bus line started service to the Newport News Transportation Center on April 20, 2026.
