= Lee Hall station =

Historic railroad station in Newport News, Virginia

Lee Hall, VA
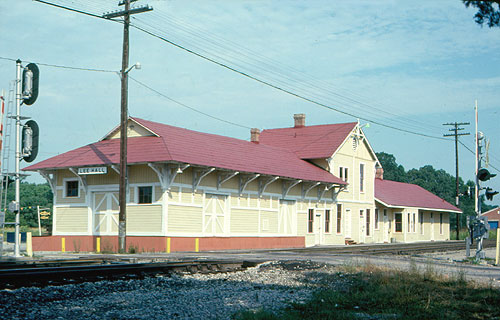
- Lee Hall station in July 1983

General information
- Coordinates: 37°11′40″N 76°34′21″W

History
- Opened: October 30, 1977
- Closed: October 28, 1995

Former services
Preceding station	Amtrak	Following station
Newport News Terminus	Colonial	Williamsburg toward Boston South
Newport News Terminus	James Whitcomb Riley until 1976	Williamsburg toward Chicago
Newport News Terminus	George Washington to 1974	Williamsburg toward Chicago
Preceding station	Chesapeake and Ohio Railway	Following station
Grove toward Cincinnati	Main Line	Oriana toward Phoebus
- Lee Hall Depot
- U.S. National Register of Historic Places
- Virginia Landmarks Register
- Location within Virginia Location within the United States
- Area: less than one acre
- Built: 1881
- Architect: C&O Railway Engineering Department
- Architectural style: Stick/Eastlake
- NRHP reference No.: 10000793
- VLR No.: 121-0014

Significant dates
- Added to NRHP: September 26, 2010
- Designated VLR: June 17, 2010
Location

Lee Hall Depot is a historic train station and museum located in the Lee Hall neighborhood of Newport News, Virginia. It was built in about 1881, with a one-story cargo bay, and the two-story main section was added in 1893. Another one-story wing was added by the Chesapeake and Ohio Railway to the north end of the depot in 1918 to handle an influx of military personnel to Fort Eustis. The building is currently in use as a local history museum, focusing on the station's history, and the history of the Chesapeake and Ohio Railway in Warwick County.

== History ==
=== Station use ===
Lee Hall Depot was built around 1881 as a part of the Peninsula Extension of the Chesapeake and Ohio Railway, being the most Western part of the Warwick County region of the expansion. It connected the Warwick Courthouse with the stations at Williamsburg and Yorktown, along with other stations on the peninsula. On October 19, 1881, the first passenger train to depart from Newport News left the station and arrived at Yorktown for the ‘Cornwallis Surrender Centennial Celebration”, a commemoration of the British defeat at the Battle of Yorktown, via temporary track. After this, it was mostly used to ship agricultural products from nearby farms. The two-story midsection was added in 1893.

A large waiting room was added in 1918 to help deal with an increase in soldiers, other military personnel, and supplies being shipped out from and taken to the nearby Camp Abraham Eustis, now Fort Eustis, giving the building its current two-story midsection and pair of wings. The ticket office was heavily remodeled in 1932. To help supplement the cargo bay, which was overflowing due to supplies being shipped in and out for the war effort, a storage shed (now demolished) was built in 1943.

The office used by the station's Railway Express Agent was removed between 1955 and 1956, and after that the depot was used for passenger service by the Chesapeake and Ohio Railway until Amtrak took over service on May 1, 1971. Amtrak resumed service to Lee Hall, albeit as a request stop, with the Colonial on October 30, 1977. Starting in 1978, the waiting room was leased to the 'Peninsula Model Railroad Club' to house their N scale model railway.

In 1981, to celebrate the centenary of the peninsular extension, the depot was renovated and some celebrations took place there on October 16, 1981. Among the festivities at the depot were the unveiling of a large oil painting created by Sidney King of the first trip from Lee Hall to Yorktown, Chesapeake and Ohio 614 and an Amtrak locomotive both giving brief train rides, ending at the station, and two "Silver Spike" reenactments by CSX and Virginia officials. The event was attended by Virginia's governor, John N. Dalton, the then President of CSX, Hays T. Watkins, French dignitaries, and the Member of the U.S. House of Representatives for Virginia's 1st district, Paul Trible.

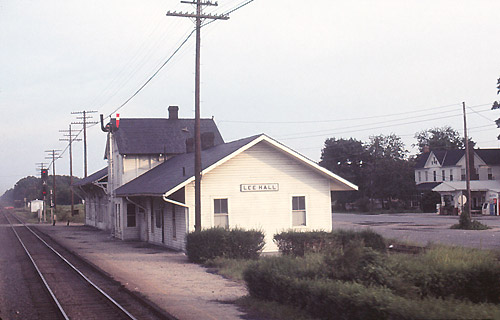
Lee Hall Depot in August 1974, before the centennial renovations.

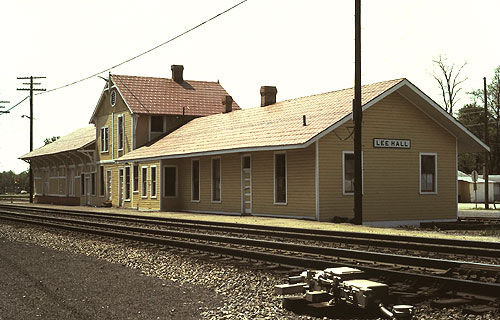
The depot in August 1982, the year after the centennial renovations

Lee Hall was dropped from the Colonial, now renamed to New England Express, in April 1995, after which, the building was used as a railcar maintenance facility. The Lee Hall Train Station Foundation was founded in 2000 to help preserve the building; due to this, the Peninsula Model Railroad Club moved out of the building in 2001.

=== Restoration ===
A $3 million grant was awarded to Newport News to restore the building in 2005, of which $600,000 was used to restore the outside of the building.

==== Relocation ====
In 2009, Lee Hall Depot was moved 165 feet from its original location to the opposite side of the tracks to meet 1993 requirements that had to be met to prevent the depot from being demolished by the CSX Railroad. The process involved carefully splitting the building into two sections, one being the waiting room wing, and the other the cargo bay and mid-section, and then joining them together on a new foundation. The process was undertaken by PMA Designs, Expert House Movers, and the City of Newport News at a cost of $900,000.

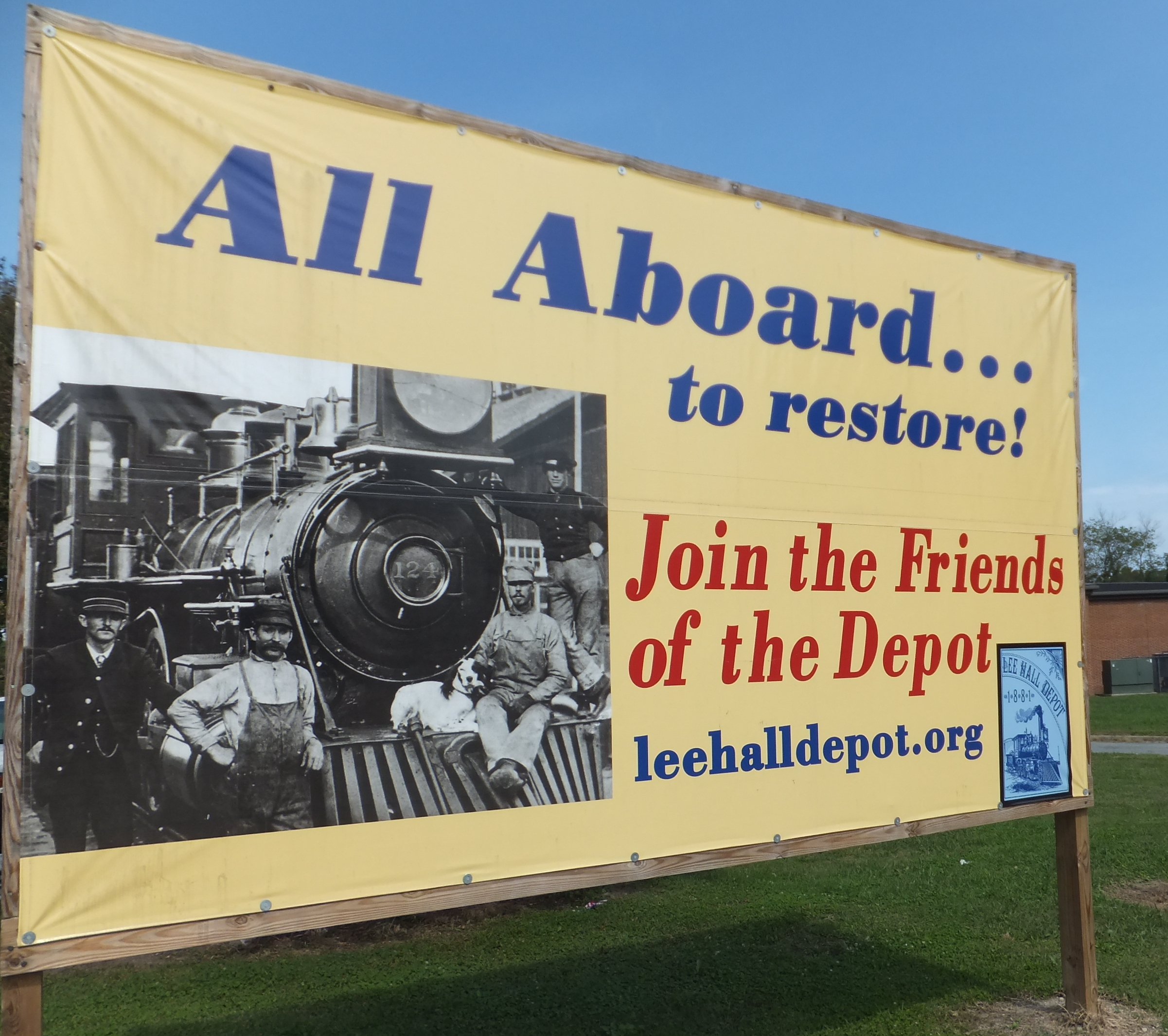
A billboard posted at the depot that advertised its restoration

==== Completion ====
The Lee Hall Depot was listed on the National Register of Historic Places in November, 2010 during its restoration. The exterior renovations were completed in 2014. In September 2015, the Lee Hall Train Station Foundation received a $600,000 federal grant to pay for the building's interior refurbishment. The museum had a soft opening in June 2021, but officially opened in July of that year.

== Architecture ==
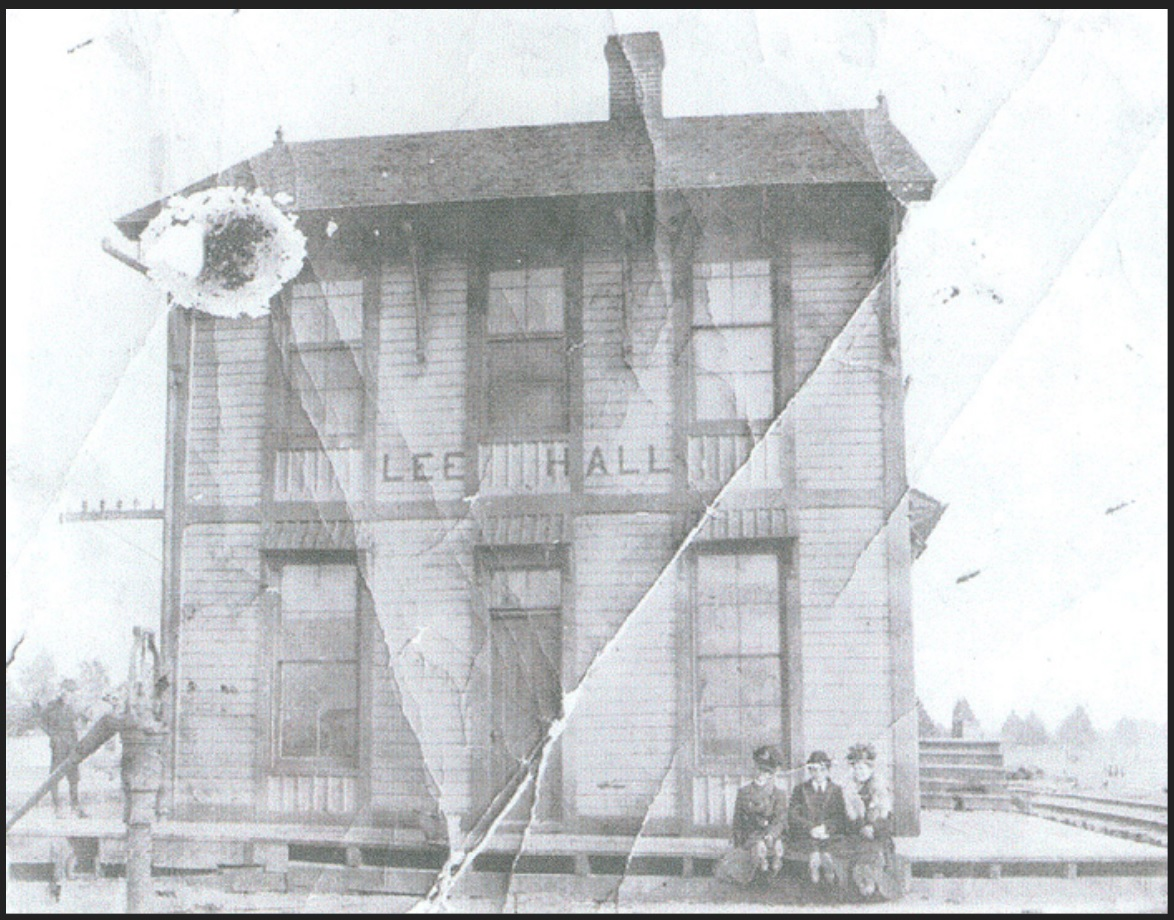
A photograph of the Depot sometime before the waiting room was added, showing the visible side of the mid-section

The Lee Hall Depot was built in stages, to a standardized design used for all Chesapeake and Ohio Railway freight houses. Its construction began sometime in 1881. The initial building was a simple one-story freight depot building measuring 25 feet (7.6 m) by 50 feet (15 m), with five double sliding doors along the freight platform. In 1893 a two-story section with a trackside pentagonal facade was added to the building. It had an office for the operator, a baggage room, and space for the Railway Express Agency. The upstairs section contained a four-room living accommodation for the stationmaster. The wood frame depot and addition were detailed using Stick style applied elements. A more ambitious design for the 1918 additions included substantial Stick style detailing of overhangs and surfaces, but was built with more restraint. The 1918 section included a ticket office situated between separate waiting rooms; one for white passengers, and a smaller one for "colored" passengers. This section's interior was finished in beaded wood paneling. The operator's bay had an indoor water well, which was accessible through a trapdoor in the floor.

== Collection, displays, and exhibits ==
=== Caboose ===
In June 2018, the Lee Hall Train Station Foundation was donated CSXT 900066, originally C&O 904144, a type-C27A bay-window caboose by the CSX for display. The caboose, which was built for the C&O by Fruit Growers Express at their Alexandria repair shop in 1980, had been in use as a shoving platform, a type of railroad car used when trains have to reverse for a long period of time, as a place at the "front" for the switcher crew to stand, but was decommissioned after it was discovered to have a brake defect, and slated to be scrapped. After being contacted by the Lee Hall Train Station Foundation, and initially turning them down, CSX decided to donate the caboose to the museum.

After the donation, the car was moved to the U.S. Army Transportation Museum and restored by a large group of volunteers at a cost of $18,262. It was then donated to the City of Newport News, due to the fact that the foundation could not afford the $5 million liability insurance required to have the caboose moved by rail. The caboose was delivered to the depot by the Fort Eustis Military Railroad, and placed on a 250-foot (76 m) piece of display track, originally a siding for the station, by crane on May 19, 2022. The caboose is currently open for tours on Saturdays and during special events.

=== Hospital Car ===
The Lee Hall Train Station Foundation is currently restoring an 80-foot (24 m) hospital car built in 1944 used at the nearby Fort Eustis during World War II; the car was formerly owned by the U.S. Army Transportation Museum. Once the restoration is completed, the car will be moved to the museum grounds and put on display on the exhibition track next to the caboose.

=== Model Trains ===
The cargo bay contains a large collection of model trains, of which most are in O gauge. The collection is kept in several large display cases, which also contain plaques and signs. The collection was donated to the museum by former Lee Hall Train Station Foundation president, Milton "Ed" Lyon.

=== Stationmaster's quarters ===
Lee Hall is unique among railway stations in that the second story of its main body was where the stationmaster would live, along with his family if he had one; stationmasters were often bachelors. It housed a parlor, kitchen, and bedroom. These rooms have been recreated as so to give an idea of what these rooms might have looked like during the interwar period, along with interpretive signs attached to plastic barriers giving context as to what the rooms were and how they were used. Inside is period furniture, cookware, toys, décor, clothes, and other objects, along with C&O memorabilia, which is also of the time. The only pieces original to the station are the porcelain sink and water heater.

This space is often fitted out to house other temporary and smaller exhibits.

=== Simulator ===
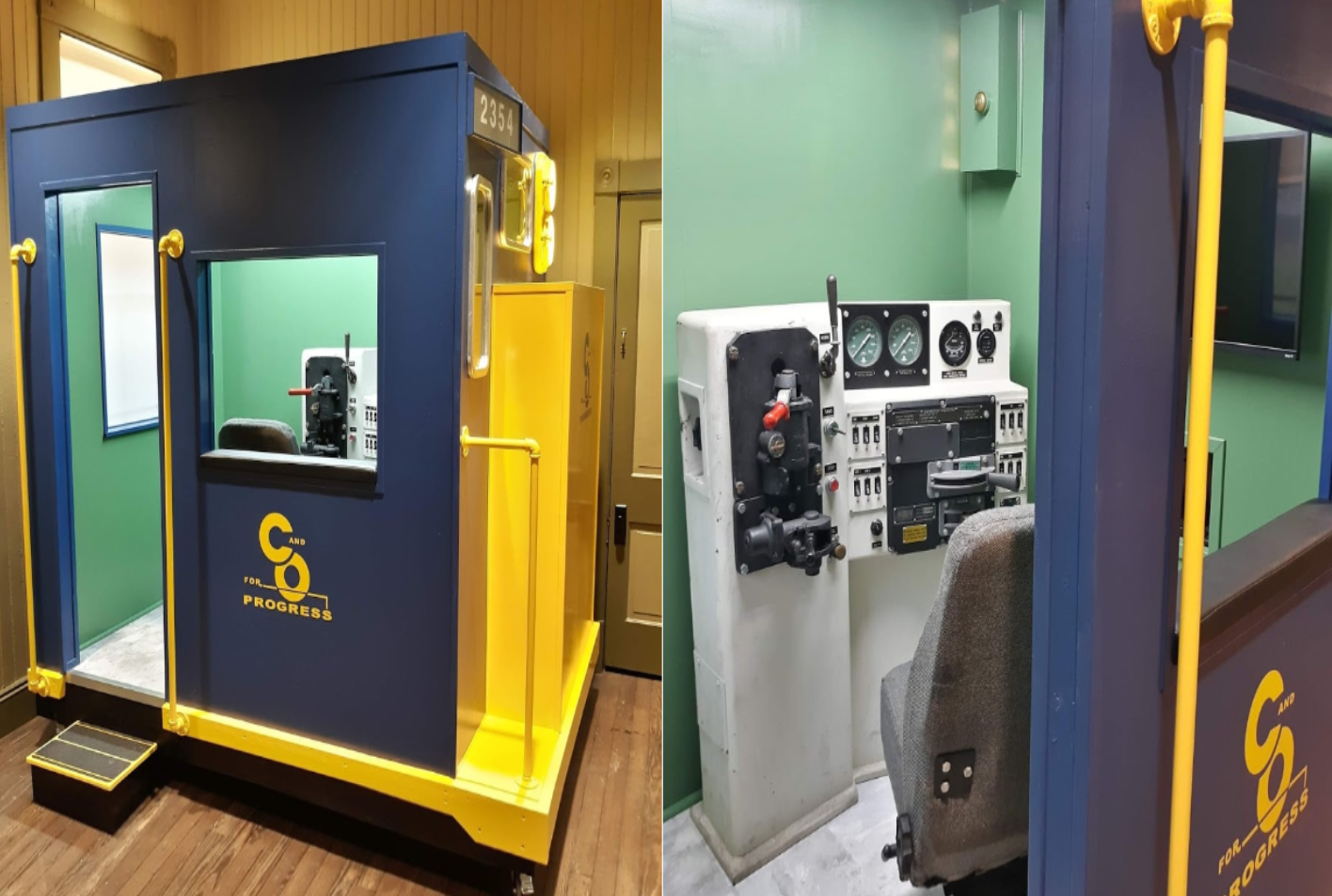
Interior and exterior shots of the simulator.

The Lee Hall Depot owns a wooden "replica" of a C&O diesel locomotive cab that is used to simulate driving a modern-day locomotive. It uses a locomotive control stand taken from an actual engine, with the switches and levers connected to a computer system attached to the back of the simulator. The brake valves were donated by Multi-Service Supply Inc. of Pennsylvania. A TV screen stands in as the front window and plays footage of a train journey from Williamsburg to Newport News. This simulator was built by museum volunteers.

=== Chessie’s Place ===
“Chessie’s Place” is the children's area of the museum, focusing on Chessie, the mascot of the Chesapeake and Ohio Railway. It contains toy and model trains, informational signs and pamphlets, a wooden toy train table, musical instruments, story books, arts and crafts, and other activities.

== Gallery ==
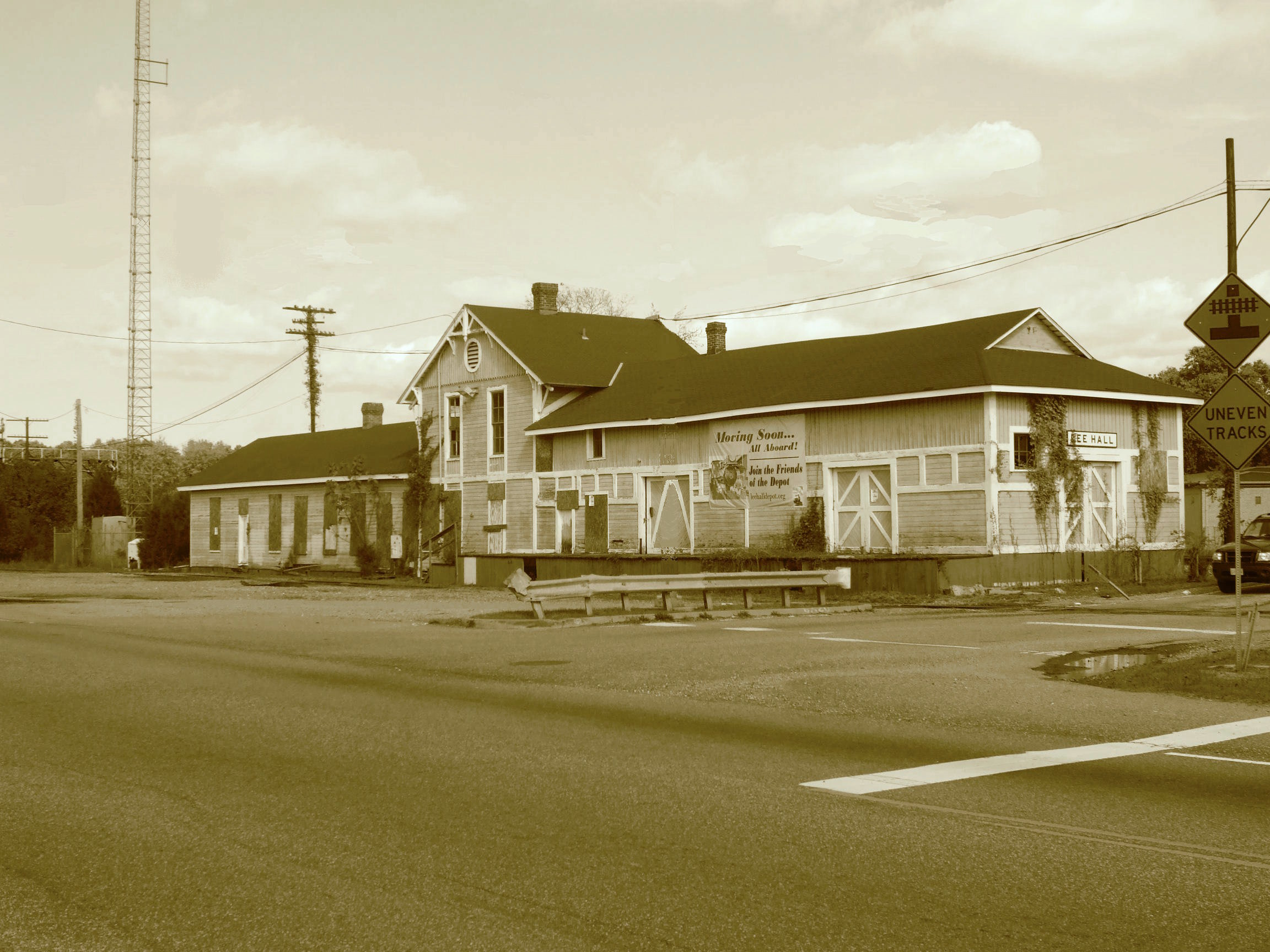
Lee Hall Depot in October 2007, early into its refurbishment and pre-relocation.

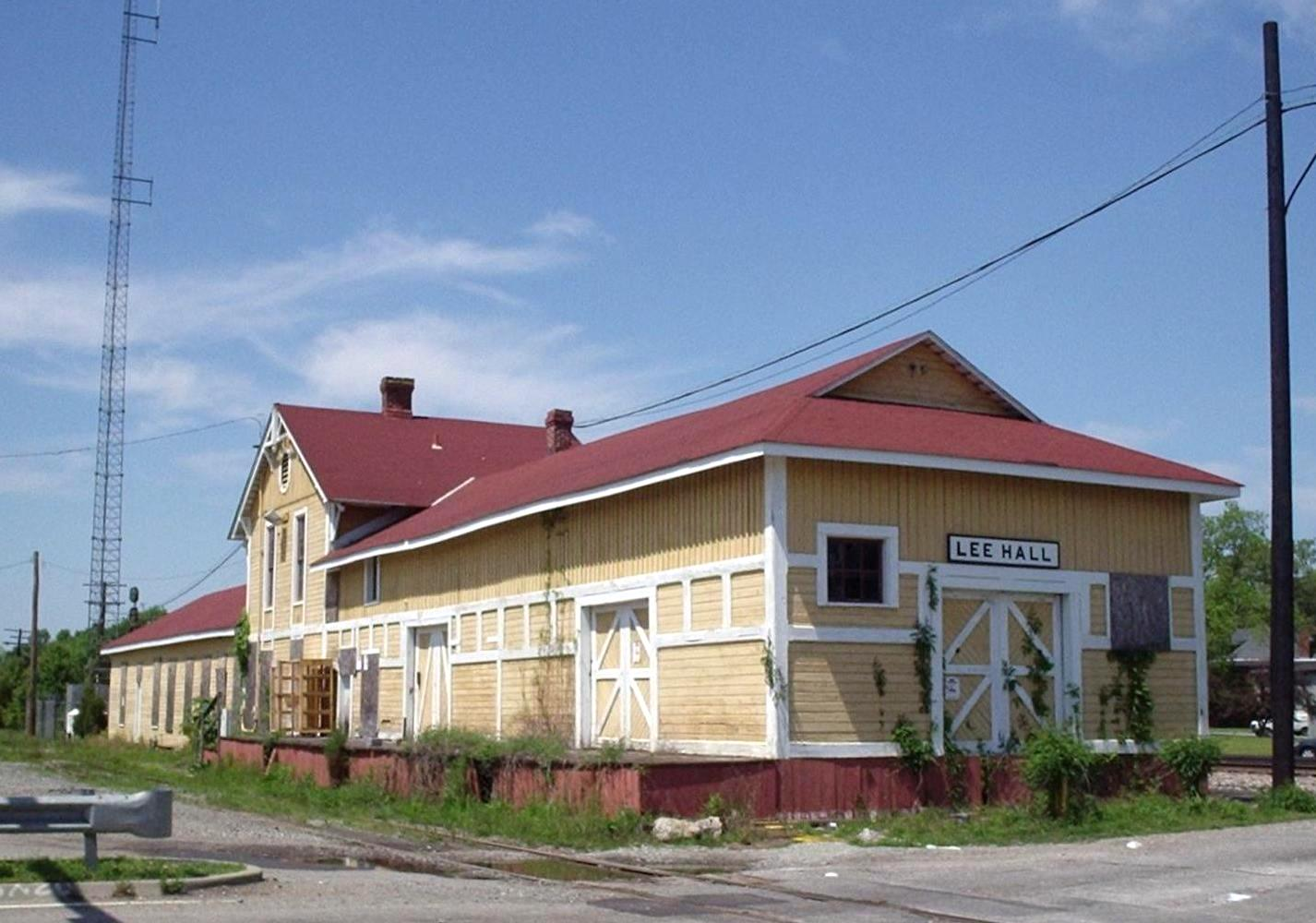
The Lee Hall Depot in 2006; the building is overrun with grime and vines.

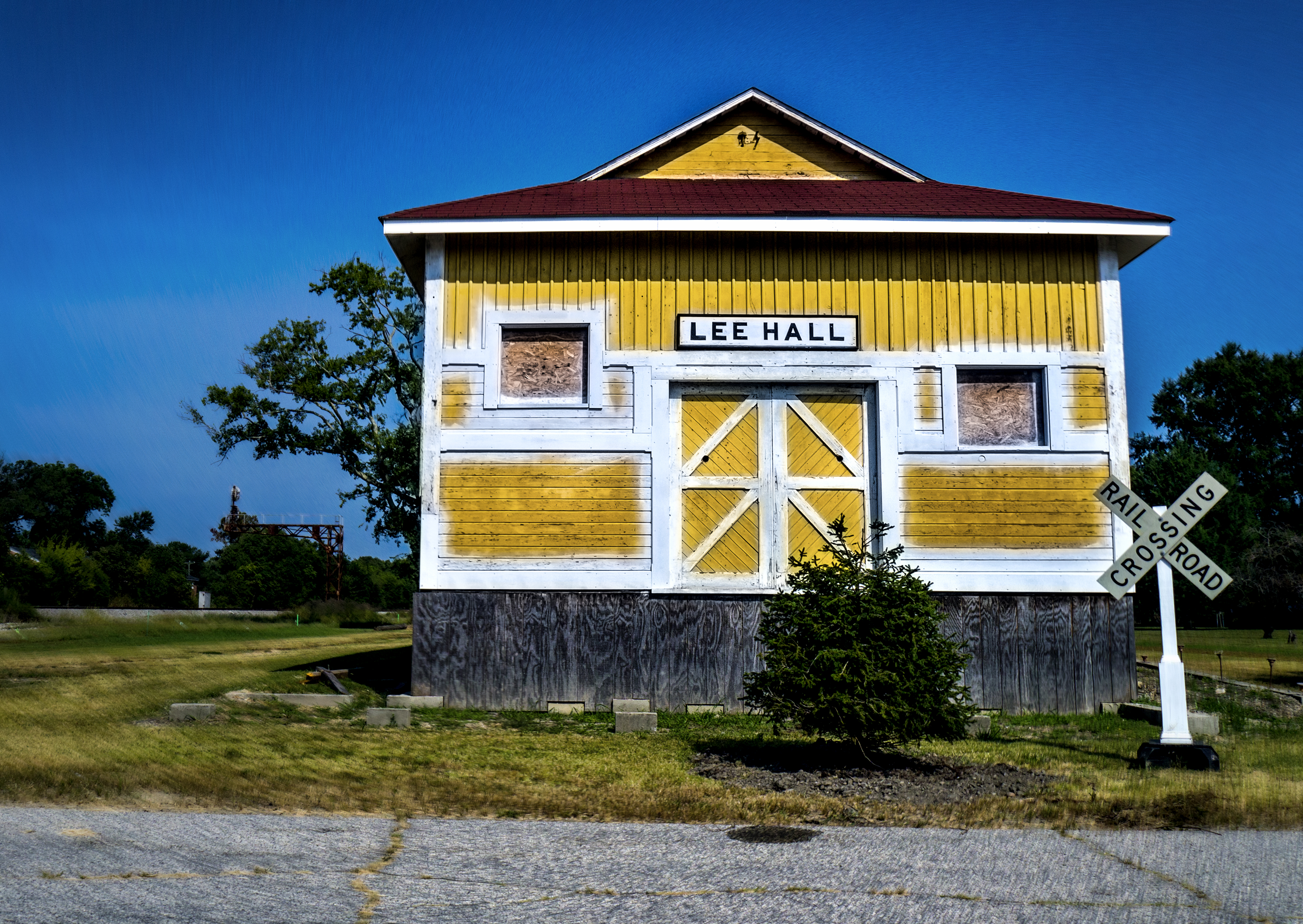
The side of the Lee Hall Depot's waiting room in September 2013. The windows are still boarded up and the foundation unfinished.

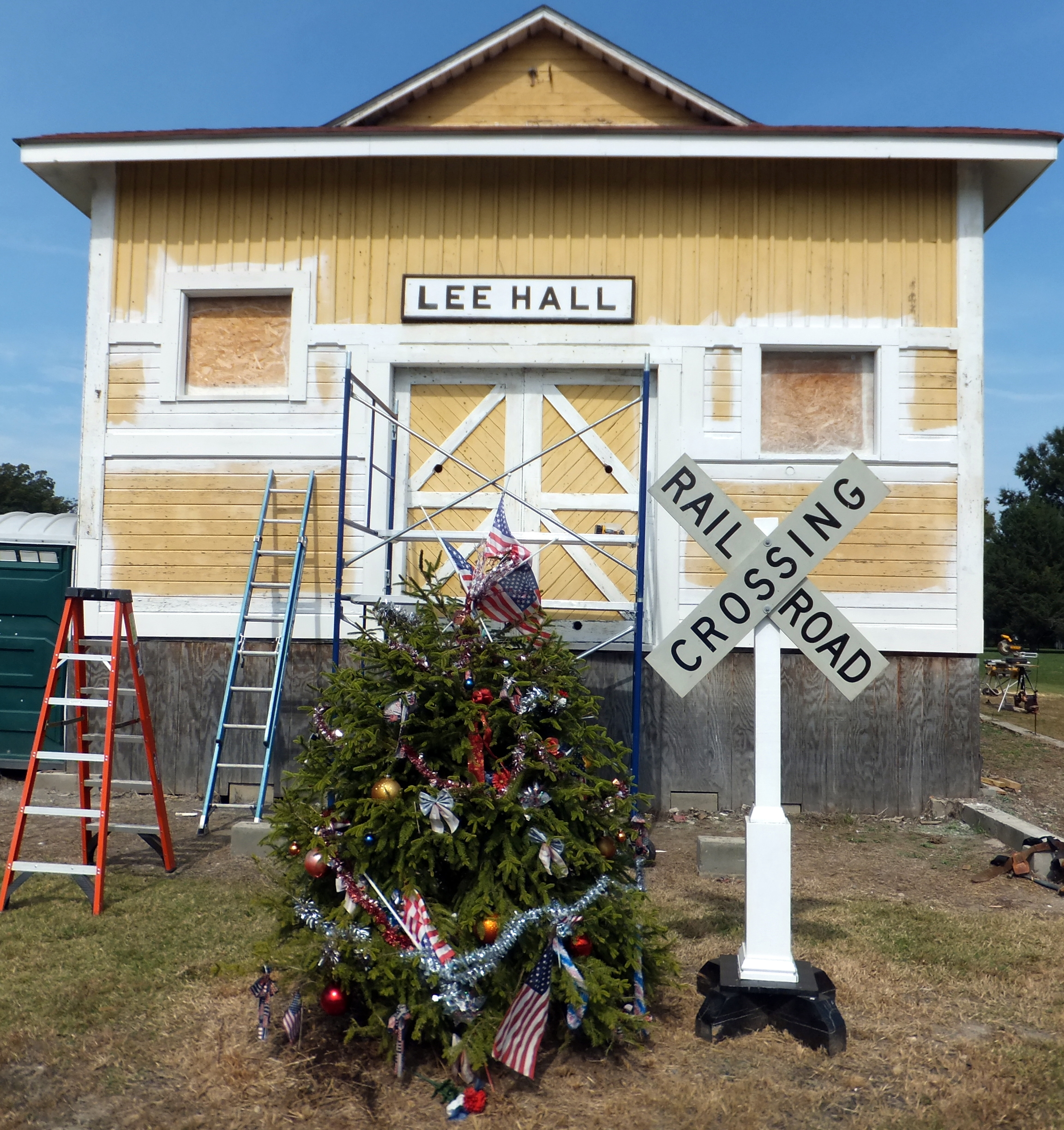
A photo of the depot during its restoration, with the post-relocation foundation visible. The foundation is made from bricks and covered in weatherboard.

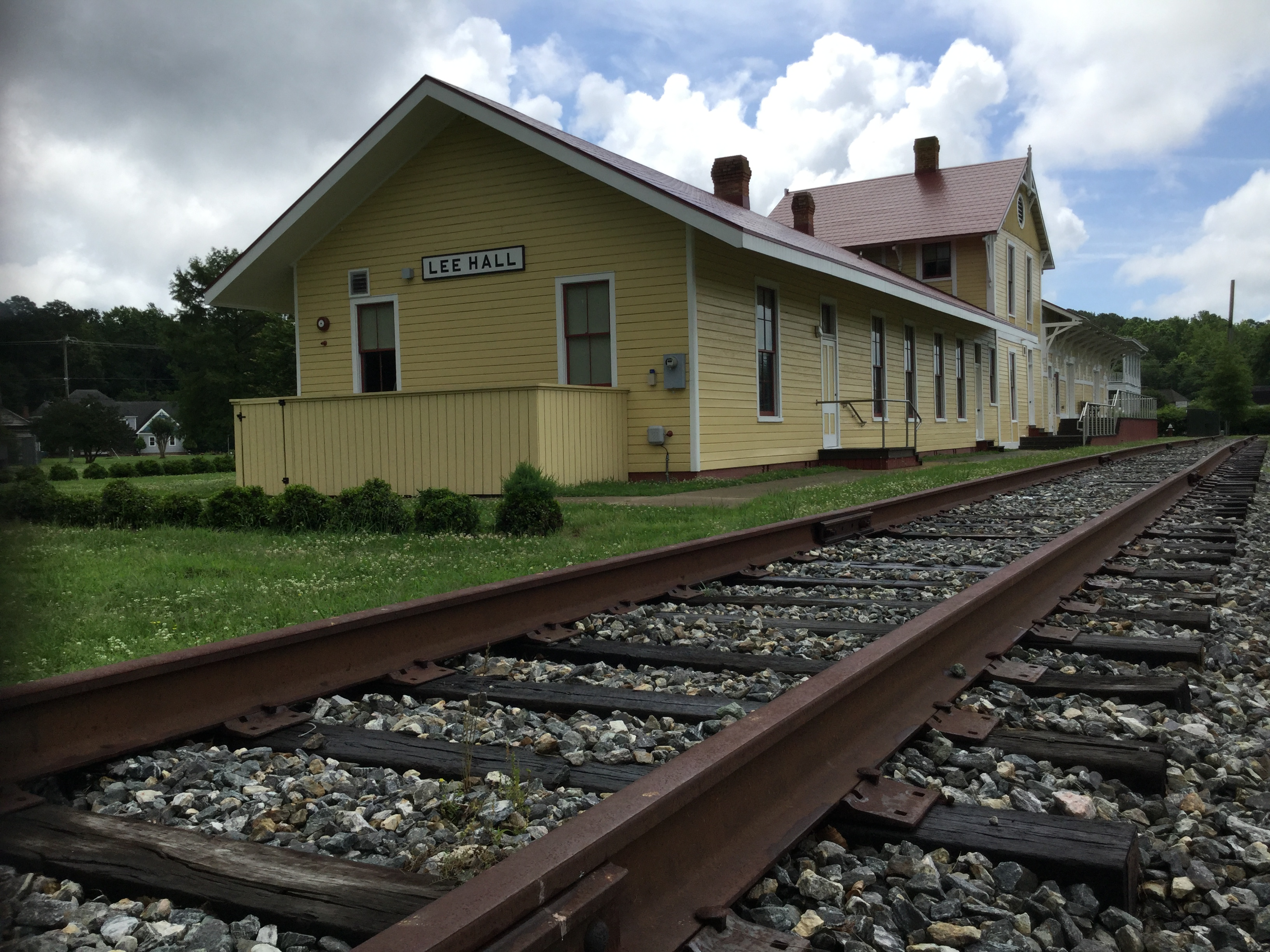
The museum's display track, a year before opening

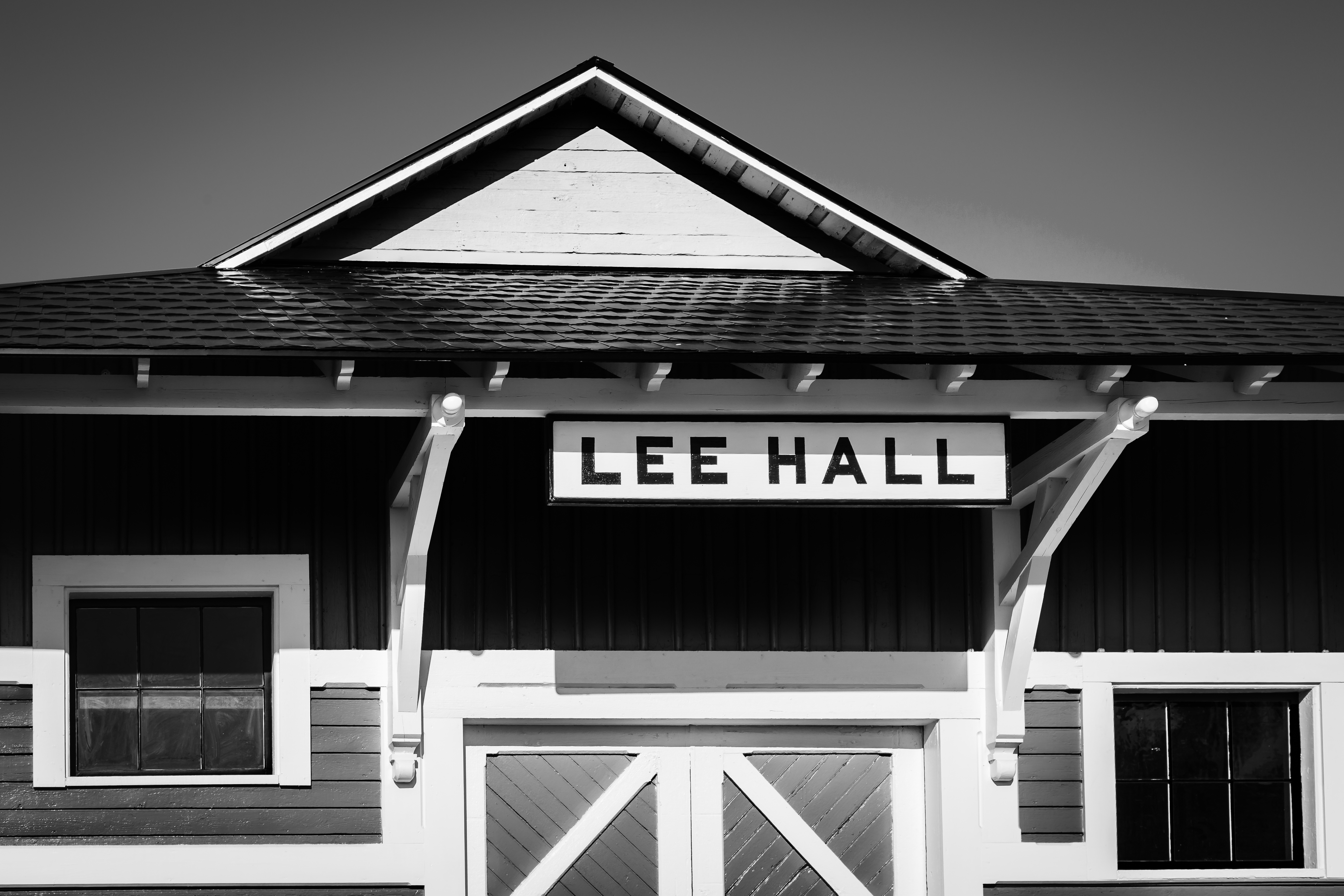
Detail of the waiting room’s exterior end, displaying the building’s characteristic overhangs and support brackets.

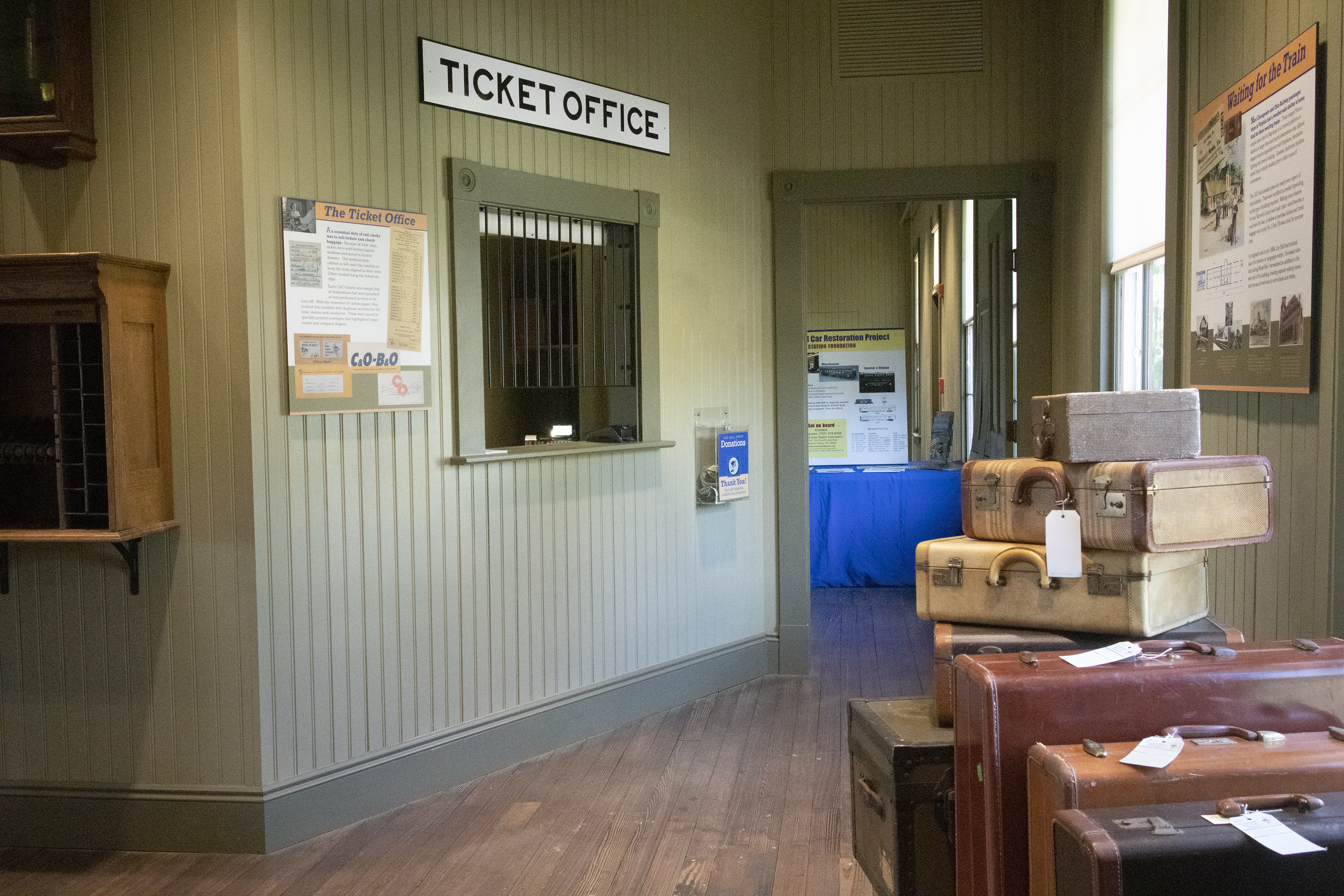
The ticket office as seen in the museum.

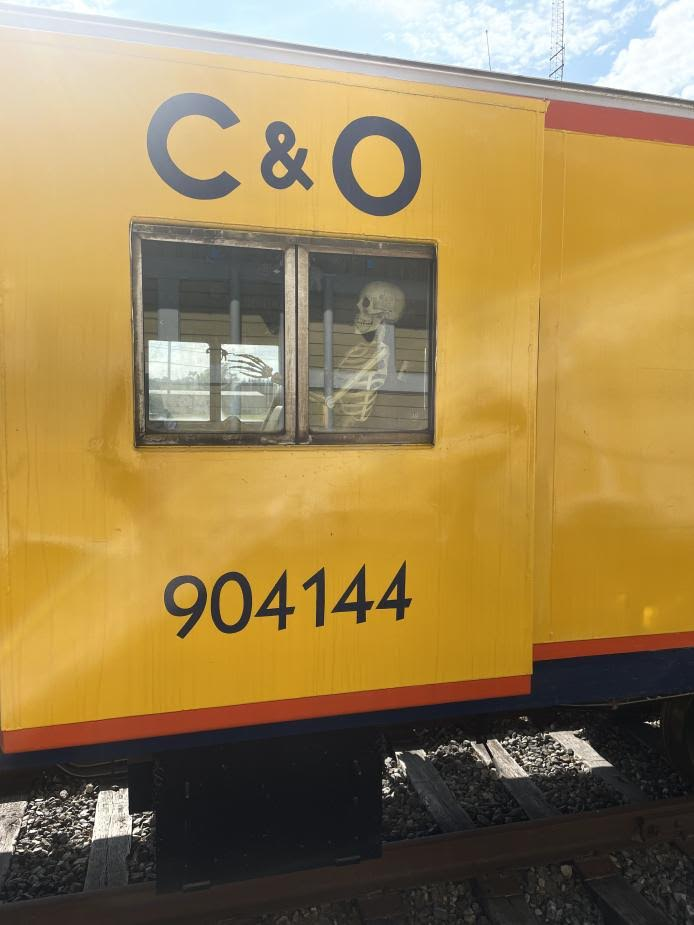
The depot's caboose while decorated for Halloween, with a skeleton inside.
