= Norge Train Depot =

- U.S. National Register of Historic Places
- Virginia Landmarks Register
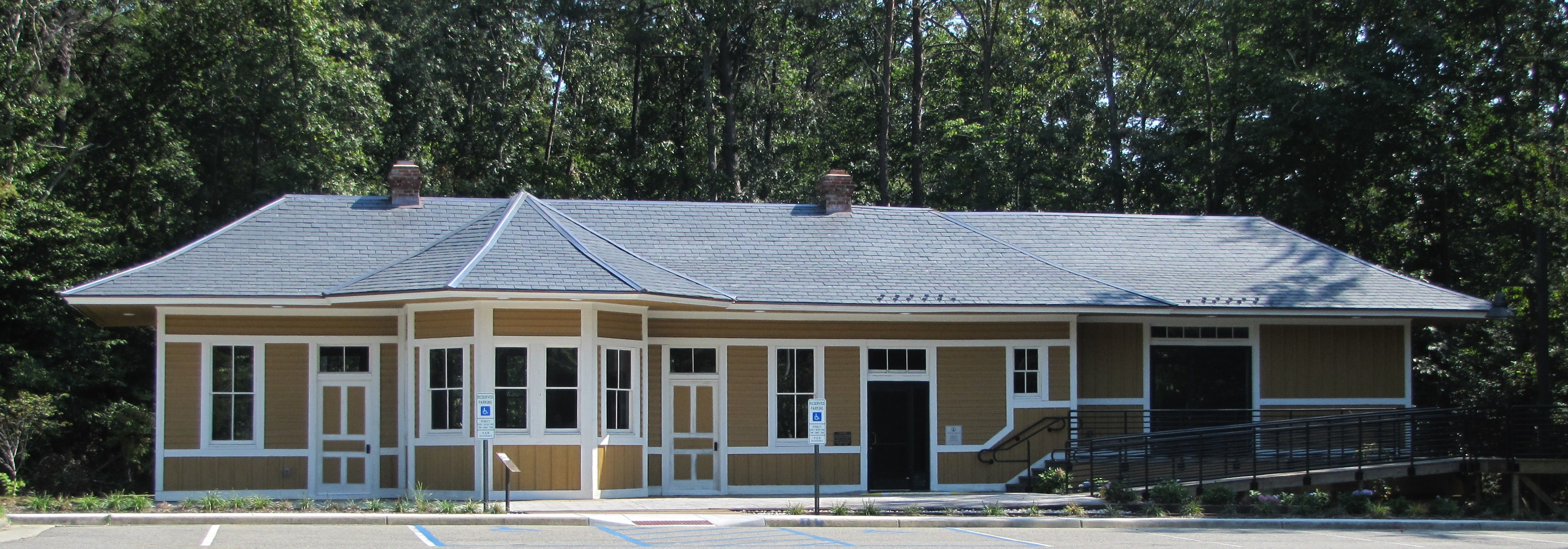
- Norge Train Depot, September 2012

- Location within Virginia Location within the United States
- Location: 7770 Croaker Rd., Norge, near Williamsburg, Virginia
- Coordinates: 37°22′39″N 76°46′15″W
- Area: less than one acre
- Built: c. 1907
- Built by: Chesapeake & Ohio Railway
- NRHP reference No.: 08000256
- VLR No.: 047-5301

Significant dates
- Added to NRHP: May 5, 2009
- Designated VLR: December 5, 2007

Norge Train Depot is a historic building located at Norge, near Williamsburg, James City County, Virginia. It was built about 1907 by the Chesapeake and Ohio Railway from standardized plans. The train station is the last surviving example of a wood frame "informal standard" depot in the six states that were served by Chesapeake and Ohio Railway. Originals were built according to an informal plan and no standard drawings were prepared or entered in the railway's set of design standards.

It is a simple one-story wood balloon frame building, twelve bays wide on the south side, seven bays wide on the north end, and one bay deep. The building is sheathed in panels of German weatherboard and features a low hipped roof with overhanging and slightly flared eaves and boxed cornice covered with beaded board siding. In February 2006, the station was relocated about 1 mile to a site adjacent to the James City County Branch of the Williamsburg Regional Library (opened in 1996) on Croaker Road. It was renovated as a museum and a community center in 2012.

It was listed on the National Register of Historic Places in 2009.

In December 2015 the Norge Depot Association brought in a red Georgia Railroad caboose donated by the Cumberland Hospital for Children and Adolescents in New Kent County. A restoration of the caboose is planned.

== Gallery ==
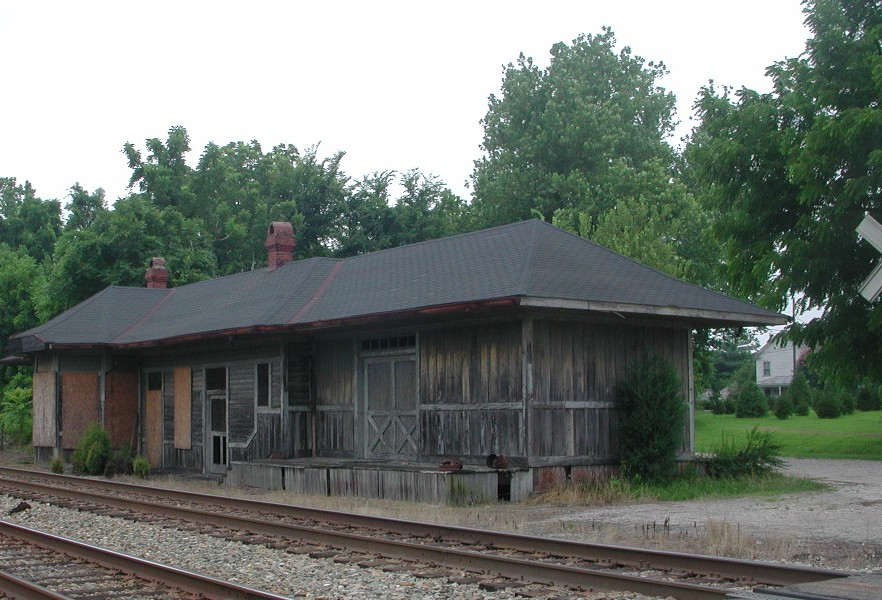
The Norge Depot at its original site on Peach Street

Preceding station	Chesapeake and Ohio Railway	Following station
Toano toward Cincinnati	Main Line	Williamsburg toward Phoebus
