= Night Owl (train) =

Named passenger train of Amtrak

Overview
- Locale: Northeastern United States
- Predecessor: Federal
- First service: June 6, 1972
- Last service: July 10, 1997
- Successor: NortheastDirect; Twilight Shoreliner
- Former operator: Amtrak

Route
- Termini: Boston; Washington, D.C.
- Service frequency: Nightly
- Train numbers: 66 and 67

On-board services
- Seating arrangements: Reclining coach seats
- Sleeping arrangements: Roomettes
- Baggage facilities: Baggage car

The Night Owl was a passenger train operated by Amtrak on the Northeast Corridor between Washington, D.C., and Boston, Massachusetts, via New York City. It operated from 1972 to 1995 on an overnight schedule with sleeper service; it was the only such train on the Northeast Corridor. In 1995 Amtrak dropped most individual train names from its Northeast Corridor services and the Night Owl became another NortheastDirect service, but still on an overnight schedule. Amtrak replaced it with the Twilight Shoreliner in 1997.

== History ==
At first Amtrak did not feature overnight service on the Northeast Corridor. The last such train was the Federal, operated by Penn Central. Amtrak did not retain the Federal and it made its last run on April 30, 1971. Amtrak restored overnight service on June 6, 1972. The new train was named the Night Owl (numbered 168/169) and carried coaches, sleeping cars, and a buffet-lounge-sleeper. The southbound Night Owl departed Boston's South Station at 10 PM and arrived in Washington's Union Station at 8:30 AM. The northbound train departed Washington at 10:30 PM and arrived in Boston at 8:25 AM.

In early 1977 Amtrak upgraded the Night Owl with Amfleet coaches and an Amfleet dinette. Beginning on January 8, 1978, the Night Owl was combined with the Hilltopper, creating through service from Boston to Catlettsburg, Kentucky. The Hilltopper was discontinued on September 30, 1979, and the Night Owl reverted to Boston-Washington service.

Between April–October in 1992 Amtrak operated a section of the eastbound Night Owl via the so-called "Inland Route". At New Haven, cars separated and operated via Hartford, Connecticut, and Springfield, Massachusetts, into Boston. At the time Amtrak contemplated replacing the overnight Washington–Montreal Montrealer with a Boston–Montreal day train. If this had come to pass the Inland Route section would have connected with this train in Worcester, Massachusetts. Nothing came of the proposed change to the Montrealer and ridership on the section was low. Amtrak permitted smoking aboard the Night Owl until 1994.

One regular traveler on the Night Owl was then-senator Joe Biden, who recalled falling asleep (on more than one occasion) on the train north out of Washington and waking up in Philadelphia's 30th Street Station, well past his usual stop at Wilmington, Delaware. Biden jokingly blamed the incidents on fellow senator Arlen Specter, who, Biden claimed, "told [the conductors] not to wake me up in Wilmington."

=== Executive Sleeper ===
In October 1984 Amtrak revived the concept of the "set-out sleeper", last seen on the Northeast Corridor in 1970. Amtrak parked a sleeping car at Pennsylvania Station in New York City. Ticketed southbound passengers were permitted to board beginning at 9:30 PM. The car was attached to the southbound Night Owl, which had a scheduled departure time from New York of 3:50 AM. Conversely, the northbound Night Owl dropped a sleeping car in New York at a similarly early hour, but passengers could remain aboard until 8:00 AM. This service made the Night Owl a real option for business travelers between New York and Washington. Amtrak termed this service Executive Sleeper, although New York Executive and Washington Executive were also employed. Amtrak ended the service on August 19, 1994, because of equipment shortages.

=== MBTA crash ===
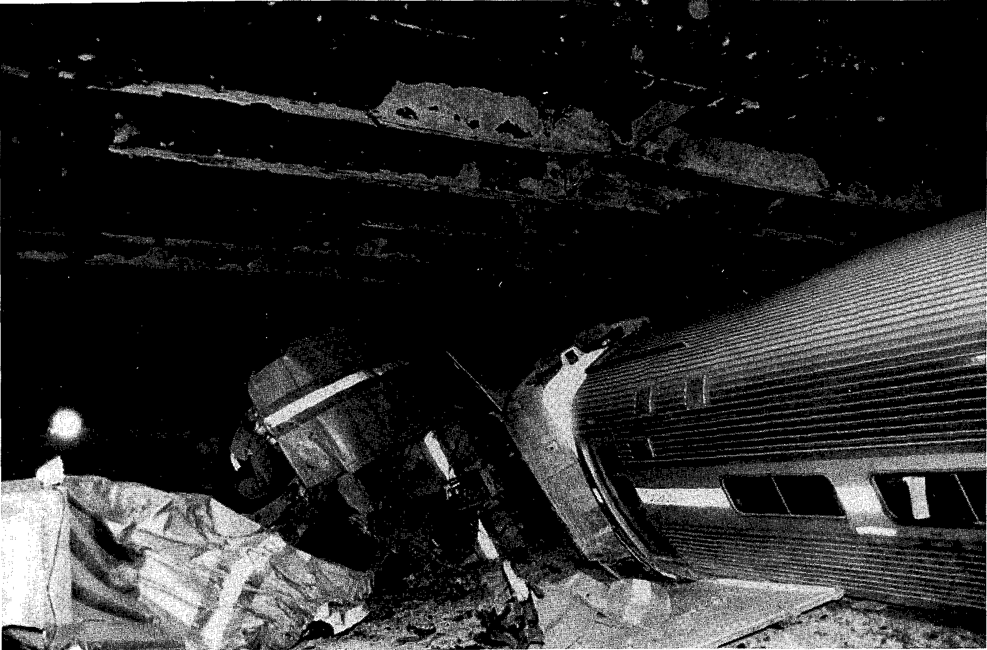
The Night Owl wrecked at Back Bay in 1990

On December 12, 1990, the Night Owl was involved in what was then the most serious accident in the history of the Massachusetts Bay Transportation Authority (MBTA). While under the direction of an apprentice engineer, the Night Owl entered a curve near Back Bay station in Boston at excessive speed. The train derailed and struck an MBTA Stoughton Line commuter train on a different track. 453 people were injured, although no fatalities resulted. The crash wrecked the two EMD F40PH diesel locomotives which were hauling the train, a material-handling car (carrying express freight), a baggage car, and two Amfleet coaches.

=== Replacement ===
In 1995 Amtrak applied the NortheastDirect branding to all intercity services on the Northeast Corridor, save long-distance trains, the New York-Philadelphia Clockers, and the premium Metroliners. The schedule remained the same and timetables still showed the Night Owl name underneath the "Northeast Direct" brand.

The Night Owl made its last run on July 10, 1997. Losses were high and its equipment was outdated. Amtrak relaunched the service as the Twilight Shoreliner. The train carried Viewliner sleeping cars, replacing Heritage Fleet equipment, and a first class-only lounge called the "Twilight Lounge". The train's southern terminus was extended from Washington to Newport News, Virginia. Dave Nogar, then Amtrak's general manager for NortheastDirect services, reflected that "Anyone who rode the Night Owl knows it was a rather unique experience. Now we have a deluxe overnight train."
