= Fast Flying Virginian =

Overview
- Service type: Inter-city rail
- Status: Discontinued
- Locale: Midwestern United States/Mid-Atlantic
- First service: May 11, 1889
- Last service: May 12, 1968
- Former operator: Chesapeake and Ohio Railway

Route
- Termini: Washington, D.C. and Phoebus, Virginia; Cincinnati, Ohio
- Distance travelled: 600 miles (970 km) (Washington-Cincinnati route)
- Train number: 3 (westbound) / 6 (eastbound)

On-board services
- Seating arrangements: Reclining seat coaches (1961)
- Sleeping arrangements: Roomettes and double bedrooms
- Catering facilities: Dining car

The Fast Flying Virginian (FFV) was a named passenger train of the Chesapeake & Ohio Railway.

The FFV was inaugurated on May 11, 1889, and ran until May 12, 1968; this was the longest running C&O named passenger train. The train operated on a daily daytime schedule, being carried from Jersey City, NJ—Penn Station in Manhattan was years in the future—as a Pennsylvania Railroad train to Washington, D.C. (after 1908 to Washington Union Station) and, as a C&O train, from there to Cincinnati, OH (after 1933 calling at the Union Terminal). The train operated westbound as #3 and eastbound as #4. The train ran behind C&O locomotives beyond Washington, DC, first to Alexandria, VA over trackage rights from the Richmond, Fredericksburg and Potomac to Alexandria, VA, there changing to tracks of the Southern Railway (now part of Norfolk Southern). In Orange, VA, C&O trains left Southern property to turn onto what is now a transfer track between Orange and Gordonsville, VA, but this track was originally part of the Orange and Alexandria Railroad, which continued through Gordonsville on to Charlottesville. This segment of track became part of the C&O, as did the track through Gordonsville, which before becoming part of the C&O was the Virginia Central Railroad. Northeast of Orange, portions of the Orange and Alexandria railroad became part of the Southern; the present-day Norfolk Southern tracks between Orange and Charlottesville were built after the Civil War. When the FFV was new, the transfer track from Southern property at Orange joined the C&O main line from Phoebus, Virginia at Gordonsville, and proceeded on them to Charlottesville. About a mile west of the C&O station in Charlottesville, the C&O tracks crossed the Southern line. The Southern station was, and is, a union station, with platforms for both main lines; a few C&O trains, but not seemingly the FFV, stopped at both stations. From Charlottesville, the FFV continued west over the Blue Ridge Mountains and North Mountain to West Virginia, along the New River Gorge, and finally crossing the Ohio River into Ohio at Cincinnati. (The "Ohio" of "Chesapeake and Ohio" is the river, not the state.)

== Features ==
Major station stops included Alexandria, VA, Charlottesville, VA, Charleston, WV, Huntington, WV, Ashland, KY, and Cincinnati, OH.

Charlottesville, besides being a junction point for all traffic going to or coming from Washington, was also where the FFV from Washington and an extension of the train from Phoebus, and later, Newport News, were combined. (Between 1953 and 1954, the eastern terminus was shipped west from Phoebus, Virginia to Newport News station.) The Phoebus/Newport News - Charlotesville section was labeled in timetables as #43 westbound or #44 eastbound.

The Fast Flying Virginian operated alongside the later George Washington and the Sportsman, being one of the C&O's most prestigious passenger trains and at the outset a prestigious train absolutely. It was the first train in the C&O system to operate with a dining car, and the original consist of the FFV was one of the first trains in the country to feature cars with enclosed "vestibules", enabling safe and convenient passage from car to car.

Unfortunately for the FFV, and the majority of American railroads, passenger trains were losing passengers to the automobile and the airplane. By the mid-1960s, the C&O, like other railroads, depended on mail and express packages to keep passenger trains marginally profitable (while being able to claim, thanks to the accounting rules, that passenger trains lost money). In 1967, when the U.S. Post Office Department canceled all their mail contracts with the railroads, the C&O like all railroads really was losing money on passenger operations. This spelled the end of the FFV, which made its final run on May 12, 1968. Actually, it spelled the end for privately operated passenger service in the US, to be replaced by Amtrak, which came in existence almost exactly three years after the FFV made its last run.

== Legacy ==
Amtrak's thrice-weekly train called the Cardinal (##50 and 51), follows the route of the FFV from New York Penn Station to Cincinnati via Washington, D.C. before continuing on to Chicago, IL via Indianapolis, IN.

The 23 October 1890 wreck of the FFV, near Hinton, West Virginia, was immortalized in the folk ballad "Engine One-Forty-Three."
