= Norge, Virginia =

Unincorporated community in Virginia, United States

Norge is an unincorporated community in James City County, Virginia, United States.

== Location ==
Norge is located on the old Richmond-Williamsburg Stage Road, which is U.S. Route 60 in modern times. Interstate 64 was built through the area in the 1970s, and passes nearby. Exit 231 is labeled "Croaker-Norge" for the two small communities nearby.

== History ==
The new community of Norge was formally established beginning in 1904 in western James City County by Norwegian Americans and other Scandinavians, with persons resettling from other places in North America joined by new immigrants. Land at Norge was reasonably priced and offered rich farm land in a gentler climate than that of the northern and Midwestern states, where some of the immigrants had originally settled upon coming to America.

When it came to naming the hamlet, Foster was the first suggestion. Foster was the name of a house that stood near the railroad tracks. However, that name was dismissed. Norway was another suggestion, but that was vetoed due to that moniker already having been assigned to another post office. So the town settled on the Norwegian spelling. The word "Norge" is the Norwegian (Bokmål) spelling of "Norway". The town’s first residents used the Norwegian pronunciation, “Nor’-ga”.

For some years, prospective new residents were introduced to the area through promotional material sent out by Carl Martin Bergh, a fellow Norwegian American with farming experience who had become a land agent for the Chesapeake and Ohio Railway (C&O). The Peninsula Extension of the railroad had been built through the area in 1881 to reach from the mountains of West Virginia to the coal piers on Hampton Roads at the new city of Newport News in adjacent Warwick County. Originally known as "Vaiden's Siding", the C&O built a railroad station at Norge in 1908. The Norge Depot offered a convenient point for shipping farm produce to places such as Richmond. Although the railroad station was closed in 1969, and C&O passenger service ended in 1971, Amtrak continues to serve the area with a stop at the Williamsburg, Virginia station.

By 1909, Norge contained 25 buildings, including homes, churches, stores and other businesses. Some of the original buildings still stand today.

== Landmarks ==
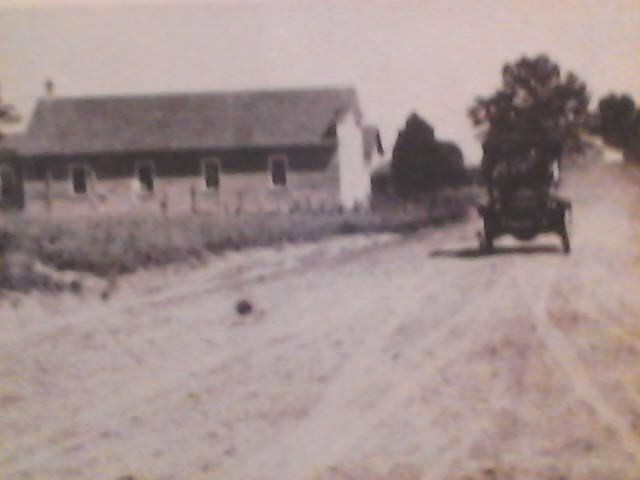
Viking Hall, early 20th century

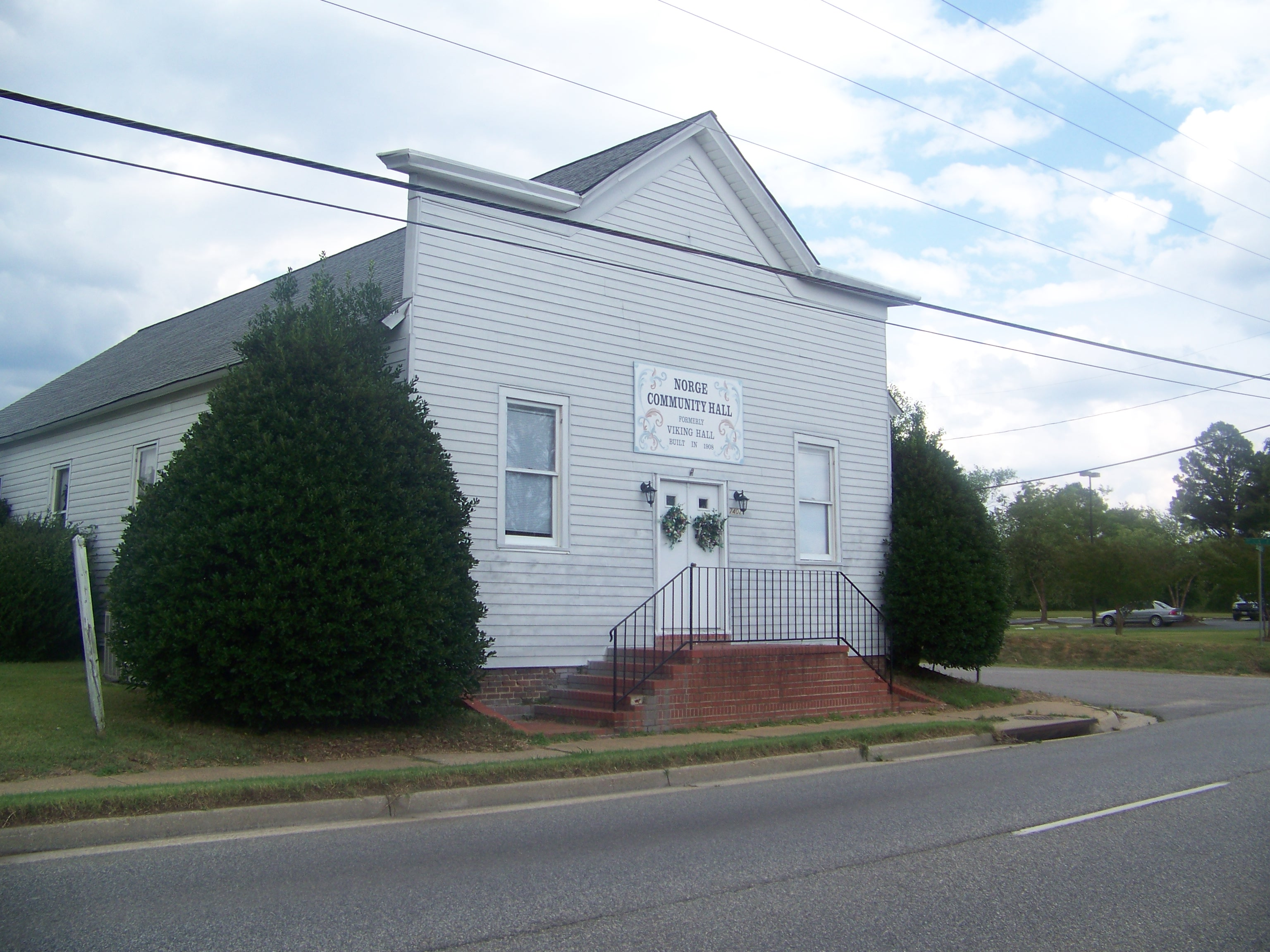
Viking Hall, now Norge Community Hall, early 21st century

The Norge Historic District was considered for the National Register of Historic Places in 1992 (reference number 92001269), but there were owner objections. The landmarks include the following:

Viking Hall: In 1908, a group of young men, who called themselves the "Vikings", purchased two lots on the corner of Richmond Rd. and Peninsula St. for $5.00 in order to construct a Town Hall. They wanted a centrally located place to be used for dances, meetings and parties as their parents had known in Norway. Viking Hall provided a space for a variety of venues until the 1920s, when it went into disrepair. The Norge Home Demonstration Club purchased the building, renovated it, and renamed it the Norge Community Hall. To this day, the community and many local organizations continue to make extensive use of this hall.

Bergh Hotel: This hotel was built at the turn of the 20th century. It was owned and operated by Alfred Bergh to accommodate the new arrivals at the new community. The building today is thriving as a furniture store: since the 1980s it has been the "Williamsburg Wicker and Rattan".

Kinde and Nesseth Store: Hans Kinde and John Nesseth opened Norge's first store in 1903. It was a general store that sold everything from clothing to fertilizer to groceries. In 1904, the first Norge [post office] operated from this facility. The building was rebuilt in 1908 after a fire, and still operates today as an antique store under the name "The Old Store in the Village".

The farm home of Carl Bergh, built around 1904, is located at the end of Farmville Lane in Norge. The house was built on the remaining foundation of Farmville Plantation Manor House dating to the early 1800s, which had burned in the 1890s.

Other landmarks in Norge include the former Doll Factory, the former Williamsburg Soap and Candle Factory, Our Saviour's Evangelical Lutheran Church and the Norge Train Depot, which was listed in the National Register of Historic Places in 2009.

== Education ==
Norge is served by Williamsburg-James City County Public Schools. Area schools:

- Norge Elementary School
- Toano Middle School
- Warhill High School

== See also ==
- Croaker, Virginia
- Williamsburg, Virginia
