= Twilight Shoreliner =

Named passenger train of Amtrak

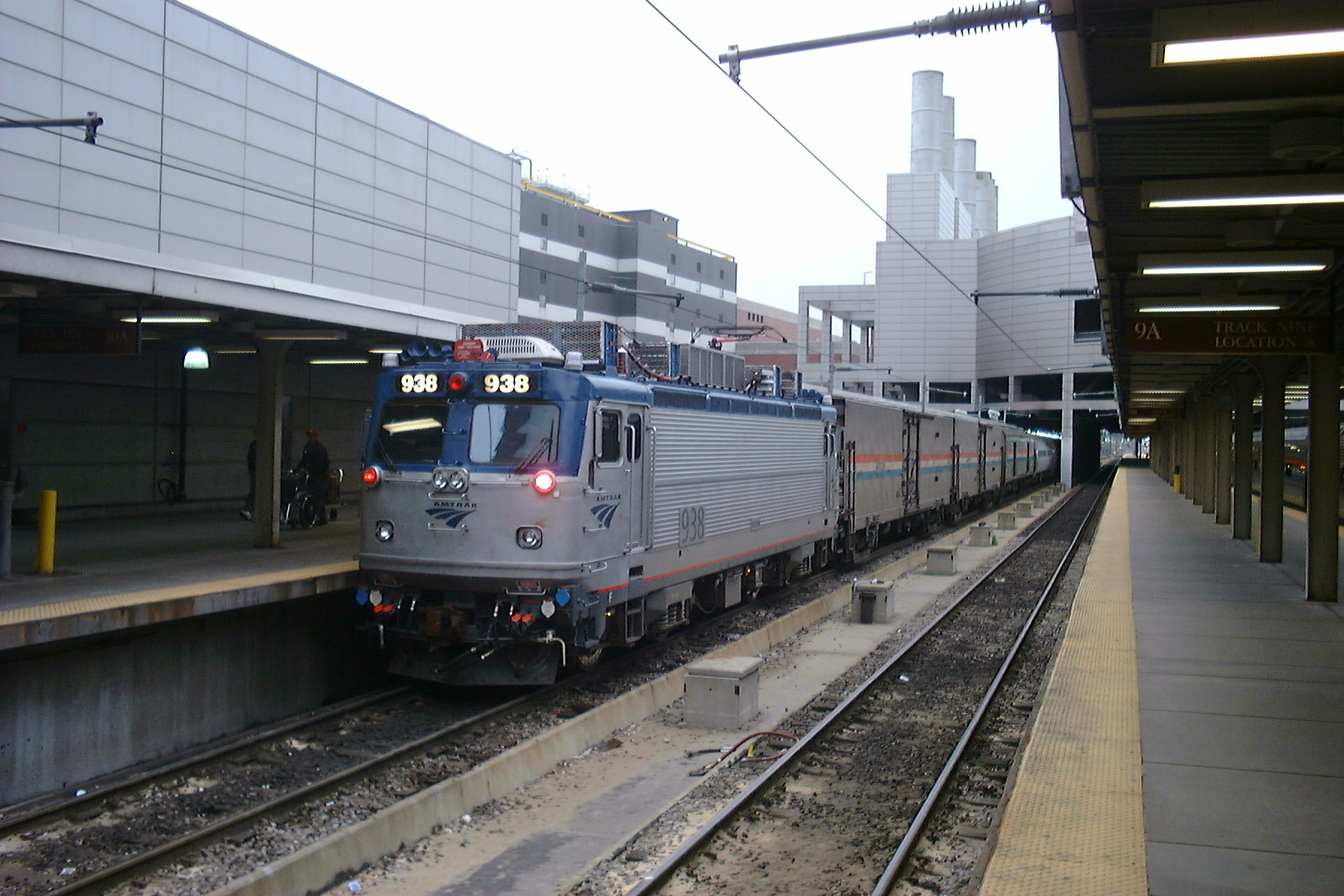
- The Twilight Shoreliner in Boston in 2002

Overview
- Service type: Inter-city rail
- Status: Discontinued
- Locale: Northeast Corridor
- Predecessor: Night Owl
- First service: July 10, 1997
- Last service: April 28, 2003
- Successor: Federal
- Former operator: Amtrak

Route
- Termini: Newport News, Virginia; Boston, Massachusetts
- Service frequency: Daily
- Train number: 66,67

On-board services
- Classes: Coach class; Custom class; Viewliner sleeper car
- Catering facilities: On-board café; Twilight Lounge

Technical
- Rolling stock: Viewliner sleepers; Amfleet coaches
- Track gauge: 4 ft 8 1/2 in (1,435 mm)

The Twilight Shoreliner was a passenger train operated by Amtrak on the Northeast Corridor between Boston, Massachusetts, and Newport News, Virginia, via New York City and Washington, D.C. Amtrak introduced it in 1997 to replace the Night Owl. It was discontinued in 2003 in favor of the Federal.

== History ==
The Twilight Shoreliner replaced the Night Owl as Amtrak's dedicated overnight service on the Northeast Corridor. Amtrak equipped the train with a Viewliner sleeping car, replacing the Heritage Fleet equipment used by the Night Owl. The new train also featured a Custom-class coach and the specially-branded "Twilight Café," which served hot meals and was restricted to sleeper- and custom-class passengers. Finally, Amtrak extended the southern terminus from Washington, D.C., to Newport News, Virginia, and moved the departure time from Boston from 10 PM to 8 PM. The Twilight Shoreliner provided a second daily frequency between the Northeast and Newport News, supplementing the Old Dominion.

Amtrak launched the Twilight Shoreliner on July 10, 1997. The cover of its Summer 1997 Northeast timetable called the train "An Unexpected Departure from the Northeast"; a full-page inset touted the many amenities available, including showers and in-room first-run movies for sleeping car passengers and the two cafe cars. By October, ridership was up 28%.

Amtrak discontinued the Twilight Shoreliner on April 28, 2003, replacing it with the Federal, which ran from Boston to Washington, D.C. Ridership from Newport News had declined in 2002–2003, and eliminating the Virginian portion of the route Amtrak could offer a better schedule to travelers on the Northeast Corridor. A southbound connection from the Federal to a Newport News-bound Regional was available at Washington, but northbound trips required a three-hour layover. The Federal was merged into the Regional brand on April 26, 2004. Amtrak re-extended overnight trains 66 and 67 (now part of the Northeast Regional brand) to Newport News on November 1, 2004; however, they do not include the sleeping car and lounge car.

Private sleeping rooms were restored to the unnamed overnight Northeast Regional trains 65/66/67 on April 5, 2021. The trains were temporarily discontinued in January 2022. On July 11, 2022, Amtrak resumed the trains without sleeper service and shifted the southern terminus of numbers 66/67 from Newport News to Roanoke, Virginia. They were temporarily cancelled north of New York City effective April 4, 2023, due to Penn Station Access construction.

== Equipment ==
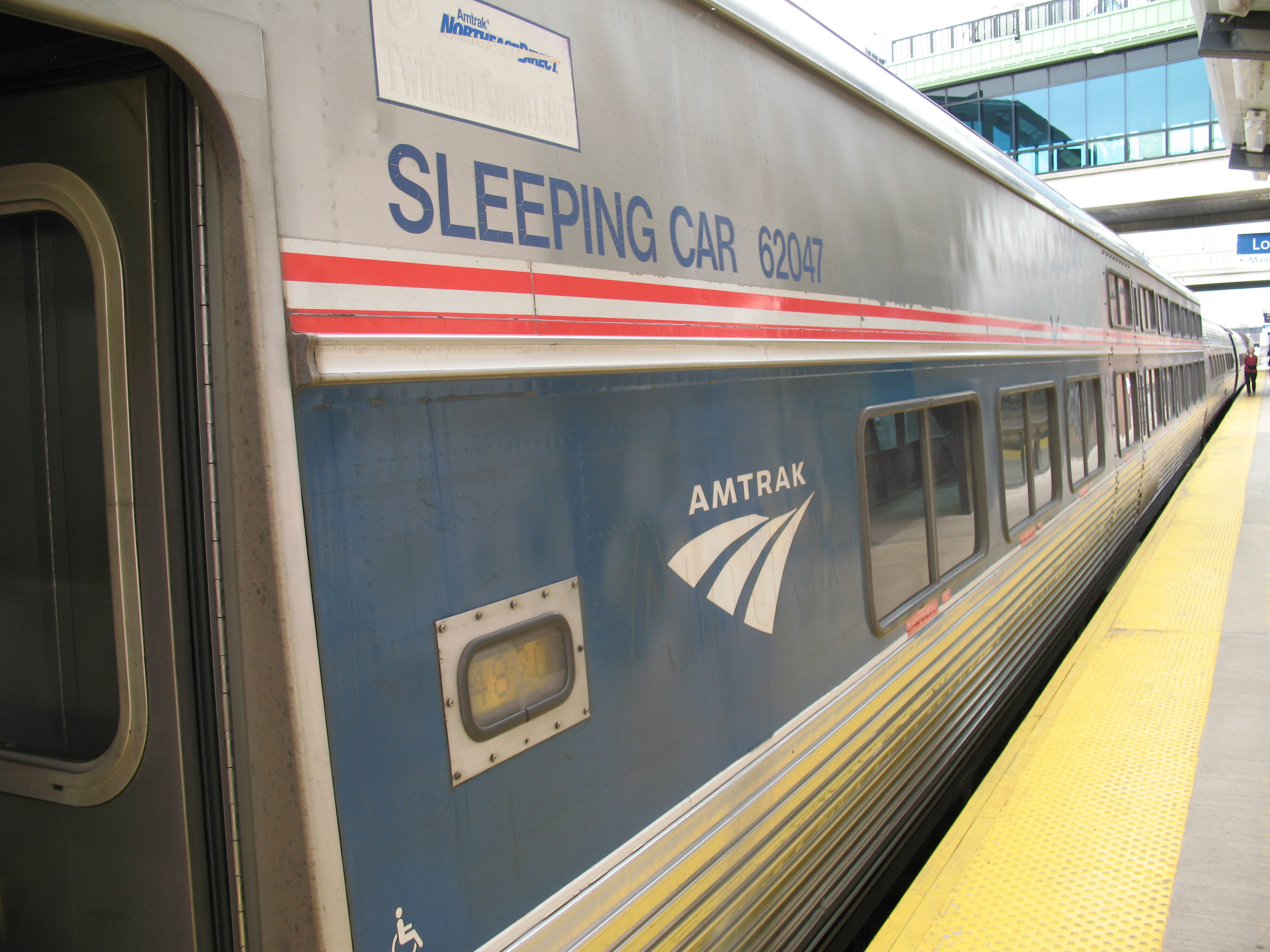
A former Twilight Shoreliner Viewliner sleeper, still in revenue service, in 2009

The Twilight Shoreliner operated with a mix of Heritage, Amfleet, and Viewliner equipment. A Heritage Fleet baggage car handled checked baggage for passengers and, beginning in 2001, bicycles. The train carried a Viewliner sleeping car except for a brief period in 2002 when Amtrak had to withdraw it because of equipment shortages elsewhere. The train carried four Amfleet coaches, two of which were configured for "Custom Class" seating. The train featured a first class-only lounge car, the "Twilight Lounge", for sleeper and Custom Class passengers. A second standard cafe car served regular coach passengers.
