= National Register of Historic Places listings in Middlesex County, Virginia =

Location of Middlesex County in Virginia

This is a list of the National Register of Historic Places listings in Middlesex County, Virginia.

This is intended to be a complete list of the properties and districts on the National Register of Historic Places in Middlesex County, Virginia, United States. The locations of National Register properties and districts for which the latitude and longitude coordinates are included below, may be seen in an online map.

There are 18 properties and districts listed on the National Register in the county.

This National Park Service list is complete through NPS recent listings posted July 10, 2026.

== Current listings ==
	Name on the Register	Image	Date listed	Location	City or town	Description
1	Christ Church	Christ Church	November 3, 1972 (#72001408)	Off Christchurch Dr., north of the junction with State Route 33; 37°36′35″N 76°32′47″W	Saluda	
2	Christchurch School	Christchurch School	May 6, 2025 (#100011800)	218 Christchurch Lane; 37°36′18″N 76°32′04″W	Saluda	
3	Deer Chase	Deer Chase	August 14, 1973 (#73002039)	Southeast of Saluda off Stormont Rd. 37°34′21″N 76°32′25″W	Saluda	
4	Hewick	Hewick	November 17, 1978 (#78003030)	Northwest of Urbanna; 37°38′33″N 76°35′13″W	Urbanna	
5	F.D. CROCKETT (log deck boat)	F.D. CROCKETT (log deck boat)	August 22, 2012 (#12000544)	287 Jackson Creek Rd. 37°33′08″N 76°19′21″W	Deltaville	
6	Lansdowne	Lansdowne	November 8, 1974 (#74002138)	Virginia St. at Upton Lane; 37°38′12″N 76°34′36″W	Urbanna	
7	Lower Church	Lower Church	April 24, 1973 (#73002038)	West of Hartfield on State Route 33; 37°33′08″N 76°27′34″W	Hartfield	
8	Middlesex County Courthouse	Middlesex County Courthouse	November 21, 1976 (#76002114)	Approximately 200 feet (61 m) northeast of the junction of U.S. Route 17 Business, State Route 33, and Oakes Landing Rd. 37°36′24″N 76°35′41″W	Saluda	Built 1852; a late but significant example of an arcade-plan civic building.
9	Middlesex County Courthouse	Middlesex County Courthouse	November 21, 1978 (#78003029)	Off Virginia St. 37°38′11″N 76°34′31″W	Urbanna	One of Virginia's eleven colonial courthouse buildings, built starting about 1745.
10	James Mills Storehouse	James Mills Storehouse	November 7, 1972 (#72001409)	Southern side of Virginia St. 37°38′11″N 76°34′23″W	Urbanna	
11	Prospect	Prospect	May 19, 2004 (#04000480)	2847 Grey's Point Rd. 37°36′01″N 76°26′39″W	Topping	
12	Rosegill	Rosegill	November 27, 1973 (#73002040)	East of Urbanna off State Route 227; 37°38′07″N 76°33′55″W	Urbanna	
13	St. Clare Walker School		April 16, 2025 (#100011697)	2911 General Puller Highway (SR 33); 37°36′12″N 76°33′42″W	Saluda vicinity	
14	Saluda Historic District		December 8, 2020 (#100005896)	Gloucester Rd., General Puller Hwy., Oakes Landing Rd. 37°36′23″N 76°35′42″W	Saluda	
15	Sandwich	Sandwich	May 8, 2008 (#08000390)	131 Virginia St. 37°38′12″N 76°34′23″W	Urbanna	
16	Urbanna Historic District	Urbanna Historic District	February 7, 1991 (#90002196)	Roughly bounded by Virginia St., Rappahannock Ave., Watling St., and Urbanna Creek; 37°38′12″N 76°34′29″W	Urbanna	
17	Wilton	Wilton	February 28, 1979 (#79003055)	South of Wilton on State Route 3; 37°31′47″N 76°25′24″W	Wilton	
18	Wormeley Cottage	Wormeley Cottage	May 23, 1980 (#80004201)	Virginia St. 37°38′09″N 76°34′41″W	Urbanna	

== See also ==
- List of National Historic Landmarks in Virginia
- National Register of Historic Places listings in Virginia
