= List of the oldest buildings in Virginia =

This article attempts to list the oldest extant buildings in the state of Virginia.

Building	Image	Location	First built	Notes
Jamestown Church		Jamestown, Virginia	finished by 1647	church tower and foundations are all that remain from the earliest period 1639–1647.
Belleville		Ware Neck, Virginia	1658 c.	Located on Belleville Lane. It seems little research has been conducted on this historic plantation. Some traditional sources, as well as the Virginia Department of Historic Resources ascribe a date of 1658.
Broad Bay Manor		Virginia Beach	1640 c. or 1660 c.	Purportedly the oldest extant European-built house in the southeastern United States. Built by Thomas Allen either c.1640 or c. 1660 on land granted to him by Governor Thomas West, 3rd Baron De La Warr. The small center portion of what is now a much larger structure, it was primarily constructed from Flemish bond brick. Corroborative dating efforts have not been performed. It has always been a private residence. It is located in the Broad Bay Colony part of northeastern Virginia Beach.
Bacon's Castle		Surry County, Virginia	1665	associated with Bacon's Rebellion
Warwick		Accomack County, Virginia	1673	
St. Mary's, Whitechapel		Lancaster, Virginia	1675	
Lowland Cottage		Ware Neck, Virginia	1676	
Winona		Bridgetown, Virginia	1681	The only known 17th-century house in the country, other than Bacon's Castle in Surry County, to have diagonally placed triple-chimney stacks.
St. Luke's Church		Smithfield, Virginia	ca. 1682	a recent dendrochronology study confirms the preponderance of other research pointing to early 1680s construction.
Ravenswood		Accomac, Virginia	1683	Also known as the Custis-Valentine house. Very little information regarding this building exists, however it is reportedly very old. Date of construction is derived from the Virginia Department of Historic Resources.
Foster's Castle		Tunstall, Virginia	1685–1690	
Building east of main house at Elsing Green		Tunstall, Virginia	1690	
Pinewoods (Lightfoot, Virginia)		Lightfoot, Virginia	ca. 1690s	
Criss Cross		New Kent, Virginia	1690	Restored in 1953, similar to Foster's Castle nearby.
Nelson-Galt House		Williamsburg, Virginia	1695	Dendrochronology provided a date that preceded tradition. Chances are the structure was moved about ten years after its initial construction to the new city of Williamsburg.
Grace Church		Yorktown, Virginia	1697	
Dogham, Doggams		Charles City County, Virginia	circa 1700 or 1652	
The Hermitage		Virginia Beach, Virginia	1700	
Belle Air Plantation		Charles City County, Virginia	ca. 1700	
John Weblin House		Virginia Beach	1700	
Westerhouse House		Northampton County, Virginia	ca. 1700	
Wren Building		Williamsburg, Virginia	1700	Oldest school building in America, original College of William and Mary structure
St. Peter's Church		New Kent, Virginia	1703	Church of Martha Washington, George and Martha Washington may have been married here
Yeocomico Church		Tucker Hill, Virginia	1706	National Historic Landmark
The Public Magazine		Williamsburg, Virginia	1715	Also known as the Powder Magazine or "Powder Horn", this unique, 3 floor octagonal building was built under the tenure of Lt. Governor Alexander Spotswood, for the storage of the colony's arms and munitions, a purpose which it served until 1775.
Bruton Parish Church		Williamsburg, Virginia	1715	Church established in 1674, current structure completed in 1715
Peyton Randolph House		Williamsburg, Virginia	1715	Oldest portions dated to 1715, current structure includes later additions and reconstructions. Colonial National Parkway passes below it.
Ware Parish Church		Gloucester Courthouse, Virginia	1718	Episcopal Church. Previously thought to have been constructed in 1690, mortar samples give a date of 1718
Brush-Everard House		Williamsburg, Virginia	1718	
Adam Thoroughgood House		Virginia Beach, Virginia	ca. 1719	despite earlier claims, actually dates to c. 1719
Pierre Chastain Home		Manakin, Virginia	1720	Oldest home in Powhatan County. French Huguenot Dr. Pierre Chastain built the home in 1720, with brick additions made in the mid-1720s
Brafferton (building)	brafferton	Williamsburg, Virginia	1723	Opened in 1723 as the Indian school for the College of William & Mary, restored in 1930–31, now serving as the president and provost office
Abingdon Glebe House		Gloucester, Virginia	Before 1724	
Lynnhaven House		Virginia Beach, Virginia	1725	
Rural Plains		Hanover County, Virginia	ca. 1725	Oldest home in America continuously occupied by one family; site of Patrick Henry's wedding
Berkeley Plantation		Charles City County, Virginia	1726	Plantation established in 1619.
Matthew Jones House		Newport News, Virginia	1727	
Willowdale		Painter, Virginia	1728	On the Eastern Shore of Virginia
Indian Banks		Simonson, Virginia	1728	
Margots		Tettington	ca. 1700–1729	
Seven Springs Plantation		Enfield, Virginia	ca. 1725–1740	
Mason House		Accomack County, Virginia	ca. 1729-1730	Date verified with dendrochronology
Wales		Dinwiddie, Virginia	ca. 1730	The original circa 1730 hall/parlor dwelling was expanded in 1752. Built for Howell Briggs (militia captain, magistrate, and vestryman)
President's House		Williamsburg, Virginia	1733	Part of the Wren Yard architectures, along with Wren and Brafferton Buildings, now the residence of the president of the College of William & Mary
Tuckahoe Plantation		Goochland	1733	Tuckahoe's original section was built in 1733. Around 1740 it was expanded to the H shape it has today.
Adam Keeling House		Virginia Beach, Virginia	1735	
Toddsbury		Gloucester County, Virginia	1735	Tradition has suggested the home was built about 1670, however, recent excavations have yielded a mid-1700s construction date.
New Kent Ordinary	New Kent Ordinary is the second brick structure from the right.	New Kent, Virginia	1736	
Blandford Church		Petersburg, Virginia	1736	Includes original Tiffany windows representing each southern state of the confederacy.
Shirley Plantation		Charles City County, Virginia	1738	Construction started in 1723. Plantation dates to 1614. Oldest family-owned business in North America
St. George's Church (Pungoteague, Virginia)		Pungoteague, Virginia	1738	Oldest church on Virginia's eastern shore
Old Stone House (Richmond, Virginia)		Richmond, Virginia	1740	Home of Edgar Allan Poe Museum
Lansdowne		Urbanna, Virginia	c. 1740	
Bel Air Plantation		Prince William County, Virginia	1740	Oldest home in Prince William County, Virginia
Old Mansion		Caroline County, Virginia	ca. 1741	Tree ring analysis of some beams yielded a date of 1741
Merchant's Hope Church		Prince George County, Virginia	ca. 1743	Despite earlier claims of 1657, a recent dendrochronological survey affirmed a date of 1743.
St. John's Episcopal Church		Richmond, Virginia	1744	
Middlesex County Courthouse		Urbanna, Virginia	1745	
Mayfield		Dinwiddie	1750	Moved from its original location a mile or so away, this is the oldest brick home in Dinwiddie county.
Aquia Church		Stafford, Virginia	ca. 1750	Mid-18th-century church
Wormeley Cottage		Urbanna, Virginia	ca. 1750	
Pear Valley		Eastville, Virginia	ca. 1750	
Mansfield		Dinwiddie, Virginia	ca. 1750	Elizabeth Keckley (Mary Todd Lincoln's seamstress) was enslaved here for four years.
Hewick Plantation		Urbanna, Virginia	Mid-18th Century	
Wilton		Richmond, Virginia	1753	
Fort Bowman		Fredrick County, Virginia	1753	Home of George Bowman, american pioneer
Mount Vernon		Fairfax County, Virginia	1758	Home of George Washington
Sandwich		Urbanna, Virginia	1758	
Hunting Quarter		Sussex, Virginia	1745–1772	Home of Captain Henry Harrison, son of Benjamin Harrison IV of Berkeley.
Mead's Tavern		New London, Virginia	1763	
James Mills Storehouse		Urbanna, Virginia	1763–1767	
Lower Brandon Plantation		Prince George, Virginia	1765	Possibly the longest running agricultural operation in the United States, having been farmed since the early 1600s.
Sessions-Pope-Sheild House		Yorktown, Virginia	ca. 1766	Recent Research suggests a date of around 1766, previously thought to have been built around 1691.
Eppington		Chesterfield, Virginia	ca. 1768	Built by Thomas Jefferson's wife's brother in law and first cousin, Frances Eppes. Jefferson's daughters came to Eppington to live while he was Minister to France. Lucy Elizabeth died at and is buried here.
Battersea		Petersburg, Virginia	1768	Built for Colonel Jonn Banister, signer of the Articles of Confederation
The Falls Church		Falls Church, Virginia	1769	The oldest house of worship in Virginia north of Quantico, completed by undertaker James Wren and received as finished by the vestry on December 20, 1769. Wren's plan was also used (with modifications) for Christ Church in Alexandria and Pohick Church in Lorton.
Morven Park		Leesburg, Virginia	ca. 1780	The home of Virginia Governor Westmoreland Davis. The earliest parts of the structure date from circa 1780 and was substantially expanded in the decades that followed. It is a Virginia Historic Landmark and listed on the National Register of Historic Places.
Marmion		Comorn, Virginia	ca. 1790	Reputedly contains the remains of a much older cottage built by colonel William Fitzhugh in about 1670.

== See also ==
- List of the oldest buildings in the United States
- List of National Historic Landmarks in Virginia
- List of Registered Historic Places in Virginia
- List of historic houses in Virginia
