= Andrew Jackson Montague =

American politician (1862–1937)

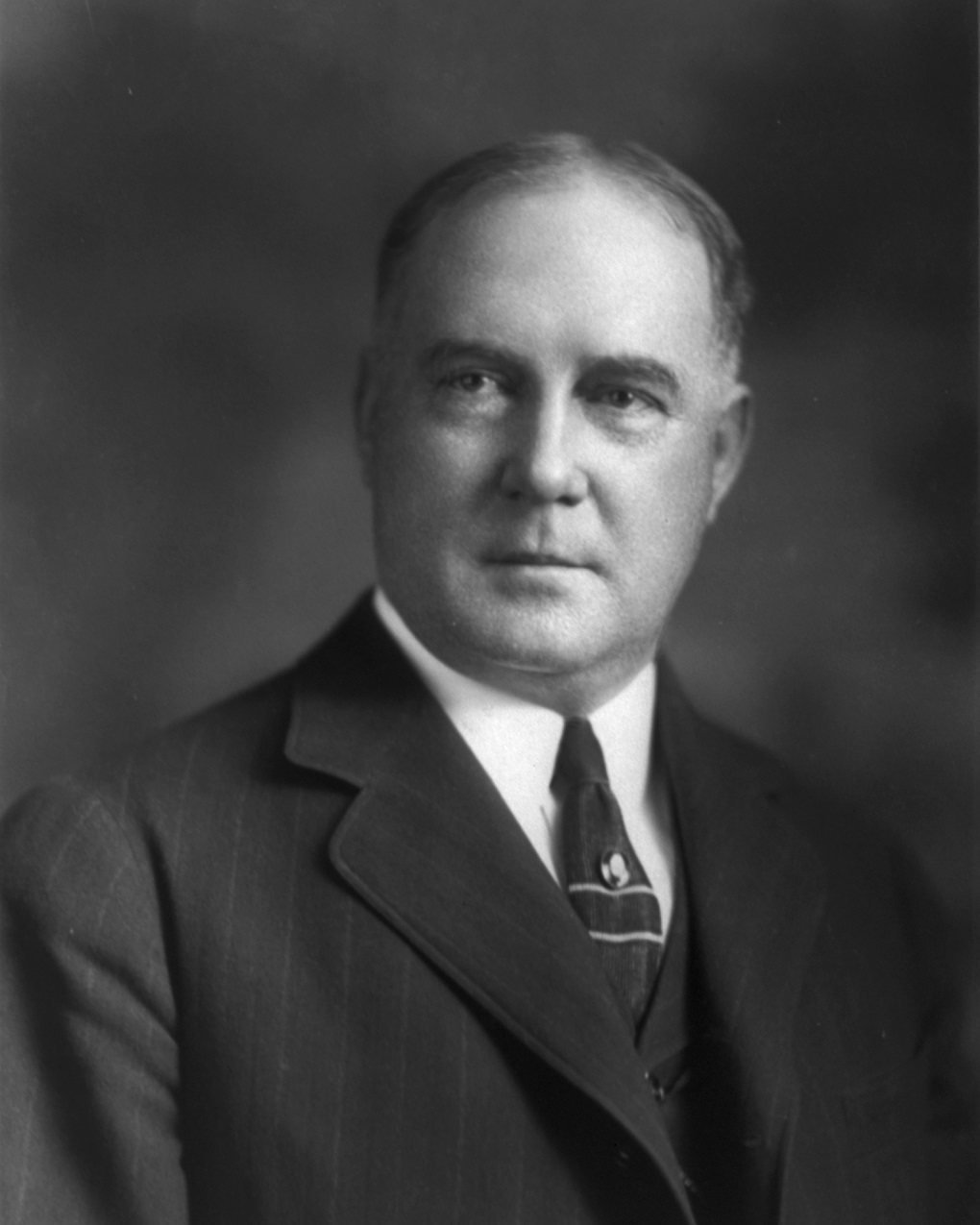
- Portrait by Harris & Ewing, c. 1913

Member of the U.S. House of Representatives from Virginia's 3rd district
- In office March 4, 1913 – January 24, 1937 at-large: March 4, 1933 – January 3, 1935
- Preceded by: John Lamb
- Succeeded by: Dave E. Satterfield, Jr.

44th Governor of Virginia
- In office January 1, 1902 – February 1, 1906
- Lieutenant: Joseph E. Willard
- Preceded by: James Hoge Tyler
- Succeeded by: Claude A. Swanson

19th Attorney General of Virginia
- In office January 1, 1898 – January 1, 1902
- Governor: James Hoge Tyler
- Preceded by: Richard C. Scott
- Succeeded by: William A. Anderson

United States Attorney for the Western District of Virginia
- In office 1893–1898
- Appointed by: Grover Cleveland
- Preceded by: William E. Craig
- Succeeded by: Thomas L. Alderson

Personal details
- Born: October 3, 1862 Campbell County, Virginia, C.S.
- Died: January 24, 1937 (aged 74) Urbanna, Virginia, U.S.
- Party: Democratic
- Spouse: Elizabeth Lyne Hoskins (m.1889)
- Children: 3
- Parent: R. L. Montague (father)
- Education: Richmond College; University of Virginia
- Profession: Politician, Lawyer

Andrew Jackson Montague (October 3, 1862 – January 24, 1937; nickname "Jack") was a Virginia lawyer and American politician. He served as the 44th governor of Virginia, from 1902 to 1906, and a Congressman from 1912 until his death in 1937. A Democrat, Montague was the first Virginia governor since the American Civil War not to have served in the Confederate military. Initially a Progressive, Governor Montague expanded the state capitol building, supported public education and the Good Roads Movement and opposed the Martin Organization. However, later as U.S. Congressman, he became a Conservative Democrat and supporter of the Byrd Organization.

== Early life and education ==
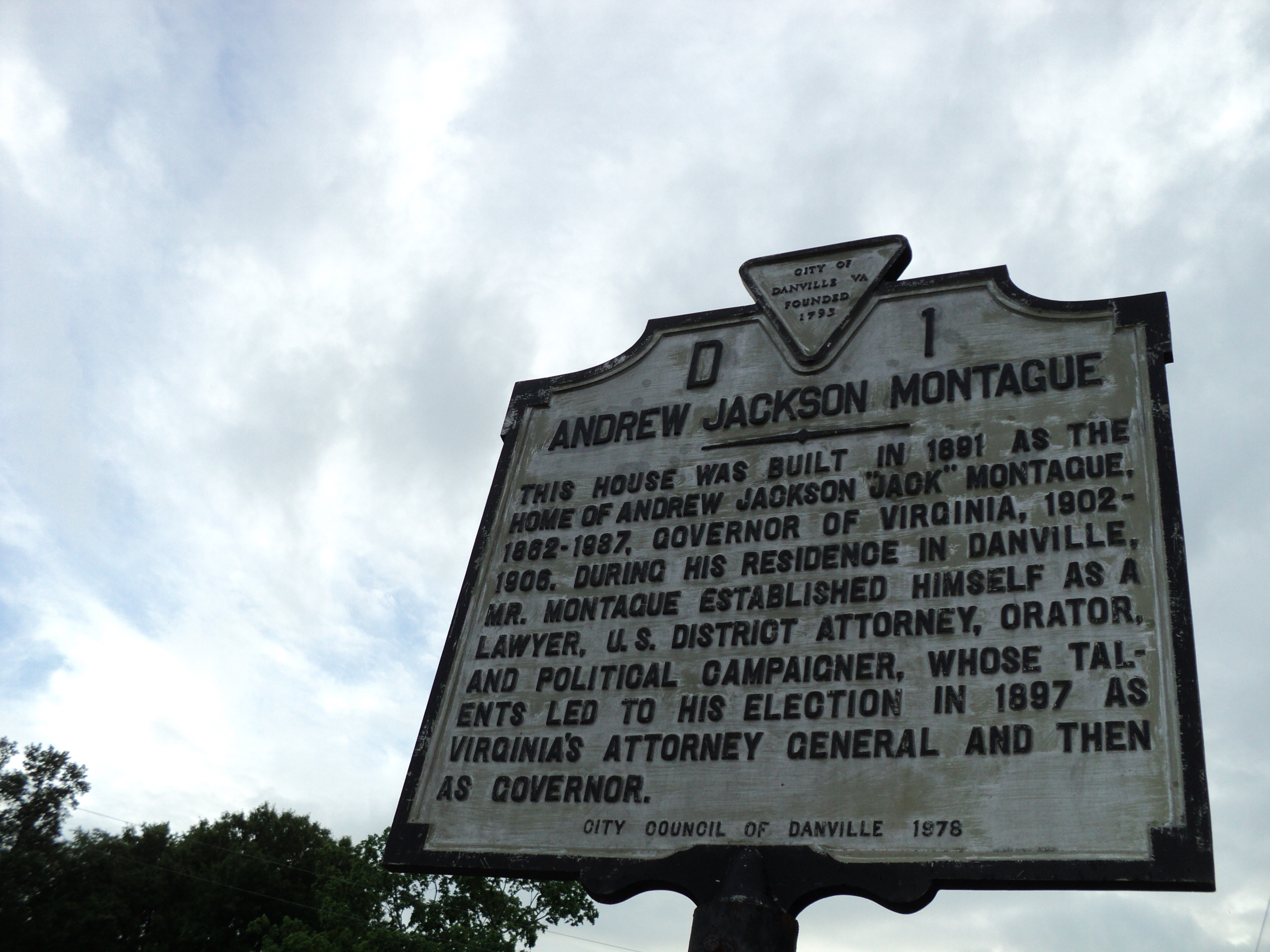
State historical marker for Andrew Jackson Montague House, Danville, Virginia

The son of prominent Confederate and later state judge Robert Latane Montague (who had succeeded John Janney as presiding officer of the Virginia Secession Convention in 1861), Andrew Jackson Montague was born in 1862 in Campbell County near Lynchburg, Virginia. He was named after his father's youngest brother, a cadet at the Virginia Military Institute who died during the American Civil War defending Richmond at the Battle of Gaines Mill months earlier. After the war, Montague's family returned to the Tidewater area; since their enslaved workers had been freed and many left, Montague worked on the family farm and attended schools in Middlesex County and Williamsburg.

After his father died in 1880, Montague moved to Richmond, Virginia. He attended Richmond College (predecessor to the University of Richmond), where he gained a reputation as a skilled orator and debater. After several years as a private tutor, Montague traveled to Charlottesville and began legal studies at the University of Virginia, graduating with a law degree in 1885. In 1905, Montague received an honorary doctorate of laws degree from Brown University.

== Career ==
After admission to the Virginia bar, Montague began his legal practice in Danville, while becoming increasing involved with the local Democratic party. In the presidential election campaign of 1892, Montague developed a relationship with Grover Cleveland, who then appointed Montague in 1893 as the United States Attorney for the Western District of Virginia. Montague held that position five years, until, in 1898, he was elected as the Attorney General of Virginia.

== Governor ==
While serving as attorney general, Montague became increasingly involved with the Virginia Progressive movement, which emphasized education reform and disfranchisement of black voters as a way to stem political corruption. Positioning himself as the independent alternative to Senator Thomas S. Martin's political machine, Montague determined to make a run in the upcoming Virginia gubernatorial election. Running on the independent platform with William A. Anderson as his proposed successor as attorney general (in contrast to Swonson and his proposed attorney general candidate John L. Jeffries of Culpeper (later Norfolk)), and with the support of Carter Glass of Lynchburg, the anti-machine candidates became the Democratic slate at the convention held in Norfolk. Montague stressed the needs for direct election of senators as well as for better roads as he canvassed the state in a buggy. He surprisingly but solidly defeated Martin's candidate, Claude A. Swanson, for the Democratic nomination for Governor of Virginia.

Montague won 58.19% of the vote in the general election of 1901, easily defeating Republican John Hampton Hoge, as well as Prohibitionist O.C. Rucker, and Socialists Hugh Motter and John J. Quantz. He became the first Virginia governor since the Civil War who had not served with the Confederate Army.

Shortly after Montague's inauguration, and with his support, the Virginia Constitution of 1902 was enacted without a referendum. Its poll taxes and literacy tests effectively disenfranchised black and poor white voters. The new Constitution created a smaller and more easily controlled electorate, thus strengthening the Martin machine.

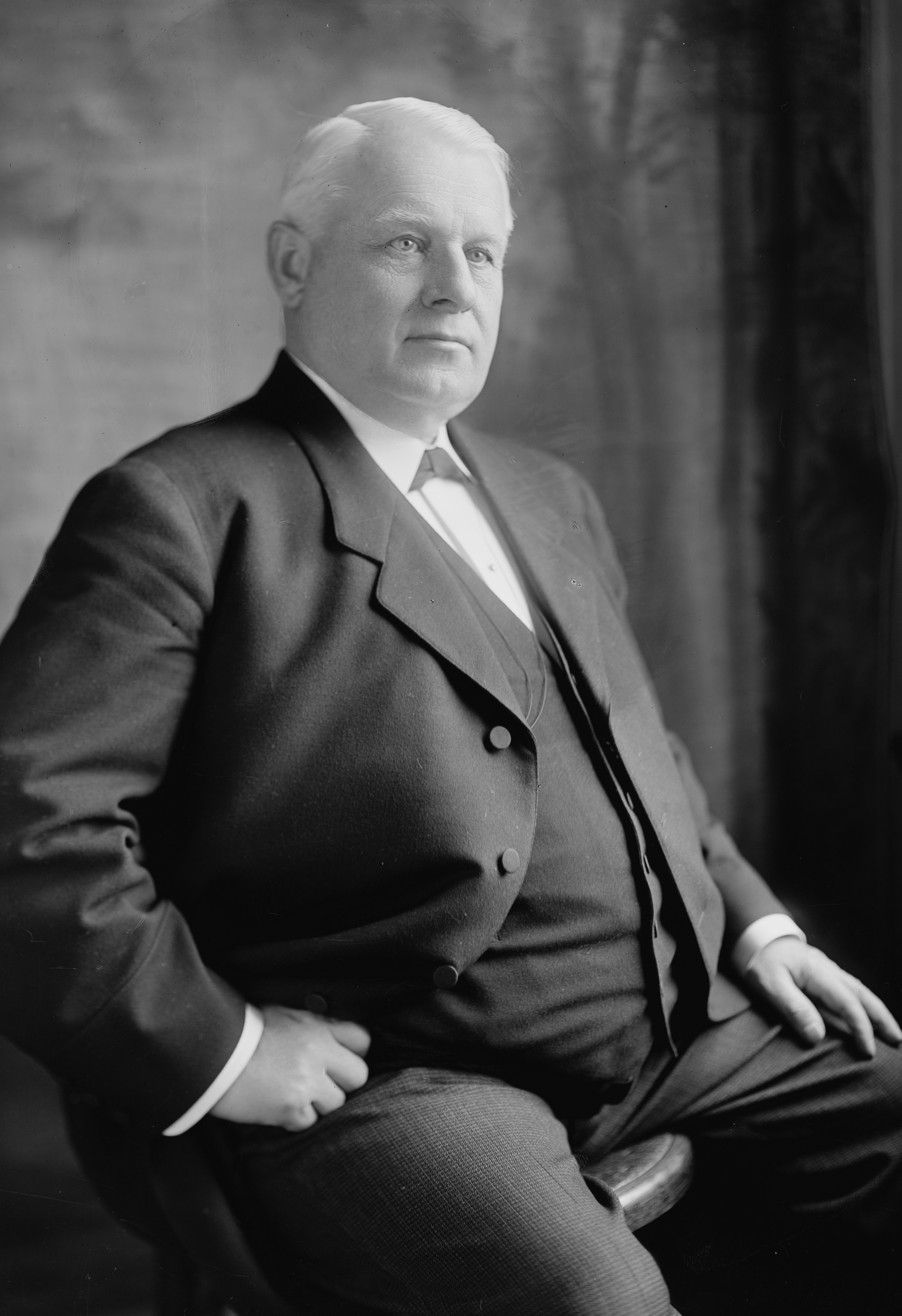
Thomas S. Martin, who defeated Montague in the critical 1905 Senate campaign

As governor, Montague enunciated a progressive agenda, and made speeches throughout the state calling for progress toward "good schools" and "good roads". His efforts on behalf of schools resulted in some tangible progress, particularly in terms of increased local funding, longer terms and school consolidation. For roads, he pressed for the creation of a state highway commission, which officially came into being two months after he left office. Montague also corresponded with progressives as varied as President Theodore Roosevelt, Clara Barton of the American Red Cross and Booker T. Washington of the Tuskegee Institute. He championed the primary process as a more open way to select political party candidates, which helped lead to the primary system being adopted for the first time in 1905. However, these accomplishments fell far short of Montague's legislative ambitions, for which he blamed a hostile legislature and the political machine run by his long-time foe, Senator Martin.

In 1905, while still governor, Montague determined to make a run for the United States Senate against the incumbent Martin. Martin and Montague represented the two main factions within the Virginia Democratic party, and their contest would effectively determine which would control Virginia politics. Martin responded to the challenge by publicly embracing Montague's main issues: good schools, good roads and the primary election process. Having minimized the differences between their positions and with a larger political organization, Senator Martin handily won re-election, leaving an embittered Montague to finish out his term as governor.

== Internationalist ==
After leaving office as governor, Montague served as the dean of Richmond College Law School for three years, before returning to the private practice of law in 1909.

In July, 1906 Montague was among the American delegates at the Conference of American States meeting in Rio de Janeiro. He later was a delegate to the Third International Conference on Maritime Law at Brussels in 1909 and 1910, as well as a trustee of Carnegie Institute in Washington, D.C., and the Carnegie Endowment for International Peace. He would become president of the American Society for Judicial Settlement of International Disputes in 1917, and serve as president of the American Peace Society (1920–1924). Montague was an "outspoken Anglophile" who was among a group of six Virginia congressmen consisting of himself as well as Patrick H. Drewry, S. Otis Bland, Joseph T. Deal, George C. Peery and Henry St. George Tucker III who spent much of the 1920s advocating closer relations between the United States and the United Kingdom.

== Congressman ==
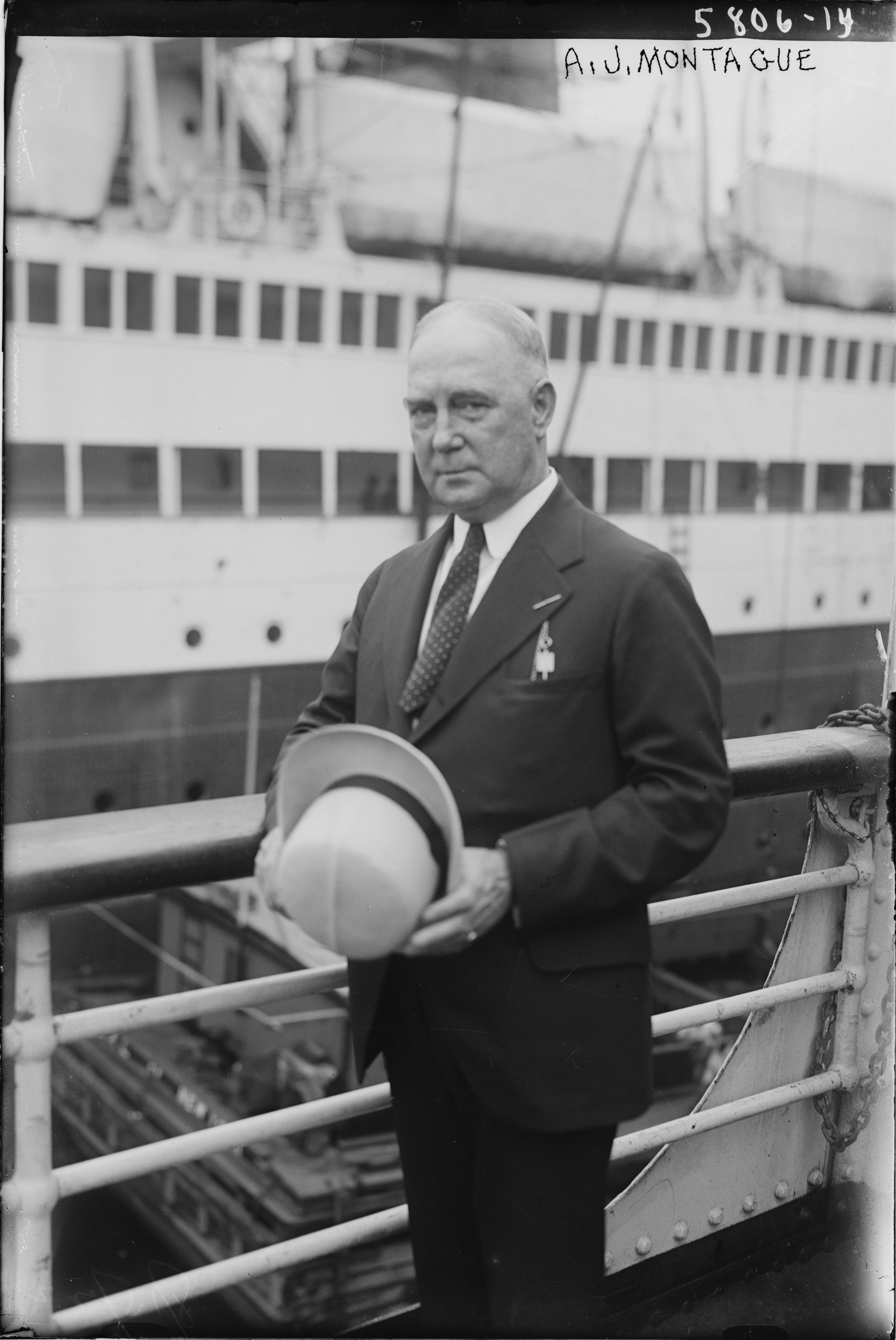
Montague c. 1922

In 1912, Montague ran for the Richmond District seat in the United States House of Representatives. He defeated the Republican incumbent, and would retain for almost a quarter of a century. He served on the Judiciary Committee and helped pass the act creating the Federal Trade Commission as well as the Trading with the Enemy Act, the Adamson Eight Hour Day Act and another allowing retirement of injured and superannuated members of the Coast Guard.

A supporter of President Woodrow Wilson's internationalist agenda, Montague lost influence when the Republicans took control of Congress in the 1920s. Despite this, and a failed bid to gain appointment to the Supreme Court, Montague was respected by his colleagues, even acquiring the nickname "Judge". In 1926, he was selected by the House as one of the impeachment managers that served as the prosecution the impeachment trial of Judge George W. English.

== Personal life ==
He married Elizabeth Lyne Hoskins (1868 - 1951), daughter of a Middlesex county doctor, on December 11, 1889. They had two sons (one died young; the other served heroically in World War I and became Brig. Gen. Robert Latane Montague Jr. (1897–1972)), as well as two daughters, Matilda Gay Montague Moore (1891–1988) and Janet Roy Montague Nunnally (1895–1977). Betsy Montague was very active in historic preservation in Alexandria, Virginia and in Williamsburg, and Gov. Montague corresponded with philanthropist John D. Rockefeller Jr., who established Colonial Williamsburg. In 1934, the Montagues purchased Sandwich at Urbanna, Virginia.

== Death and legacy ==
Congressman Montague had been in poor health for some time, and died at home but still in office on January 24, 1937, after winning a narrow election against his first significant (primary) opposition in twenty-five years. He is interred in the family's section at the graveyard of Christ Church in Saluda, Virginia.

== Electoral history ==
- 1912; Montague was elected to the U.S. House of Representatives with 97.58% of the vote, defeating Independent Chase A. Haight and Socialist Labor H. Adolph Muller.
- 1914; Montague was re-elected with 95.81% of the vote, defeating Socialist S.C. Weatherly and Socialist Labor Muller.
- 1916; Montague was re-elected unopposed.
- 1918; Montague was re-elected unopposed.
- 1920; Montague was re-elected with 72.5% of the vote, defeating Republican Walker G. Decourcy, ColR (?) H.H. Price, Independent Republican John L. Grubbs, and Socialist Muller.
- 1922; Montague was re-elected with 90.14% of the vote, defeating Republican Channing M. Ward.
- 1924; Montague was re-elected with 99.97% of the vote, defeating Republican C.B. Jones.
- 1926; Montague was re-elected unopposed.
- 1928; Montague was re-elected with 75.89% of the vote, defeating Republican J.D. Peake and Independents James E. Maynard and Henry W. Anderson.
- 1930; Montague was re-elected with 87.4% of the vote, defeating Independent Republican R. Houston Brett.
- 1932; Montague was re-elected as part of the Democratic slate for Virginia at-large Congressional district.
- 1934; Montague was re-elected with 80.45% of the vote, defeating Republican Roy C. Parks, Socialist Hilliard Bernstein, and Communist William H. Friend.
- 1936; Montague was re-elected with 84.49% of the vote, defeating Republican Charles G. Wilson and Socialist Winston Dawson.

== See also ==
- List of members of the United States Congress who died in office (1900–1949)

Party political offices
Preceded by James Hoge Tyler	Democratic nominee for Governor of Virginia; 1901	Succeeded by Claude A. Swanson
Legal offices
Preceded by Richard C. Scott	Attorney General of Virginia; 1898–1902	Succeeded by William A. Anderson
Political offices
Preceded by James Hoge Tyler	Governor of Virginia; 1902–1906	Succeeded by Claude A. Swanson
U.S. House of Representatives
Preceded by John Lamb	Member of the U.S. House of Representatives from Virginia's 3rd congressional district 1913–1933	Succeeded by District abolished Himself after district re-established in 1935
Preceded by District re-established John S. Wise before district abolished in 1885	Member of the U.S. House of Representatives from Virginia's at-large congressional district 1933–1935	Succeeded by District abolished
Preceded by District re-established Himself before district abolished in 1933	Member of the U.S. House of Representatives from Virginia's 3rd congressional district 1933–1937	Succeeded by Dave E. Satterfield, Jr.
