= Wales House =

Wales House may refer to:

== Australia ==
- Wales House, Sydney, a heritage-listed former office building, bank building and now hotel in Sydney, New South Wales

== Belgium ==
- Wales House (Brussels), the Welsh Government office in Belgium

== United States ==
- Mary Anne Wales House, Dublin, New Hampshire, listed on the National Register of Historic Places (NRHP)
- Wales House (Hyde Park, New York), NRHP-listed
- Wales (Petersburg, Virginia), a historic house and plantation, NRHP-listed
- North Wales (Warrenton, Virginia), a historic house and plantation, NRHP-listed
