= Virginia State Route 227 =

State highway in Middlesex County, Virginia, US

State Route 227

Route information
- Maintained by VDOT
- Length: 2.98 mi (4.80 km)
- Existed: 1933–present

Major junctions
- South end: SR 33 / SR 641 near Saluda
- North end: SR 602 in Urbanna

Location
- Country: United States
- State: Virginia
- Counties: Middlesex

Highway system
- Virginia Routes; Interstate; US; Primary; Secondary; Byways; History; HOT lanes
| ← SR 226 | → SR 228 |

State Route 227 (SR 227) is a primary state highway in the U.S. state of Virginia. Known for much of its length as Urbanna Road, the state highway runs 2.98 miles (4.80 km) from SR 33 near Saluda north to SR 602 in Urbanna in central Middlesex County.

== Route description ==
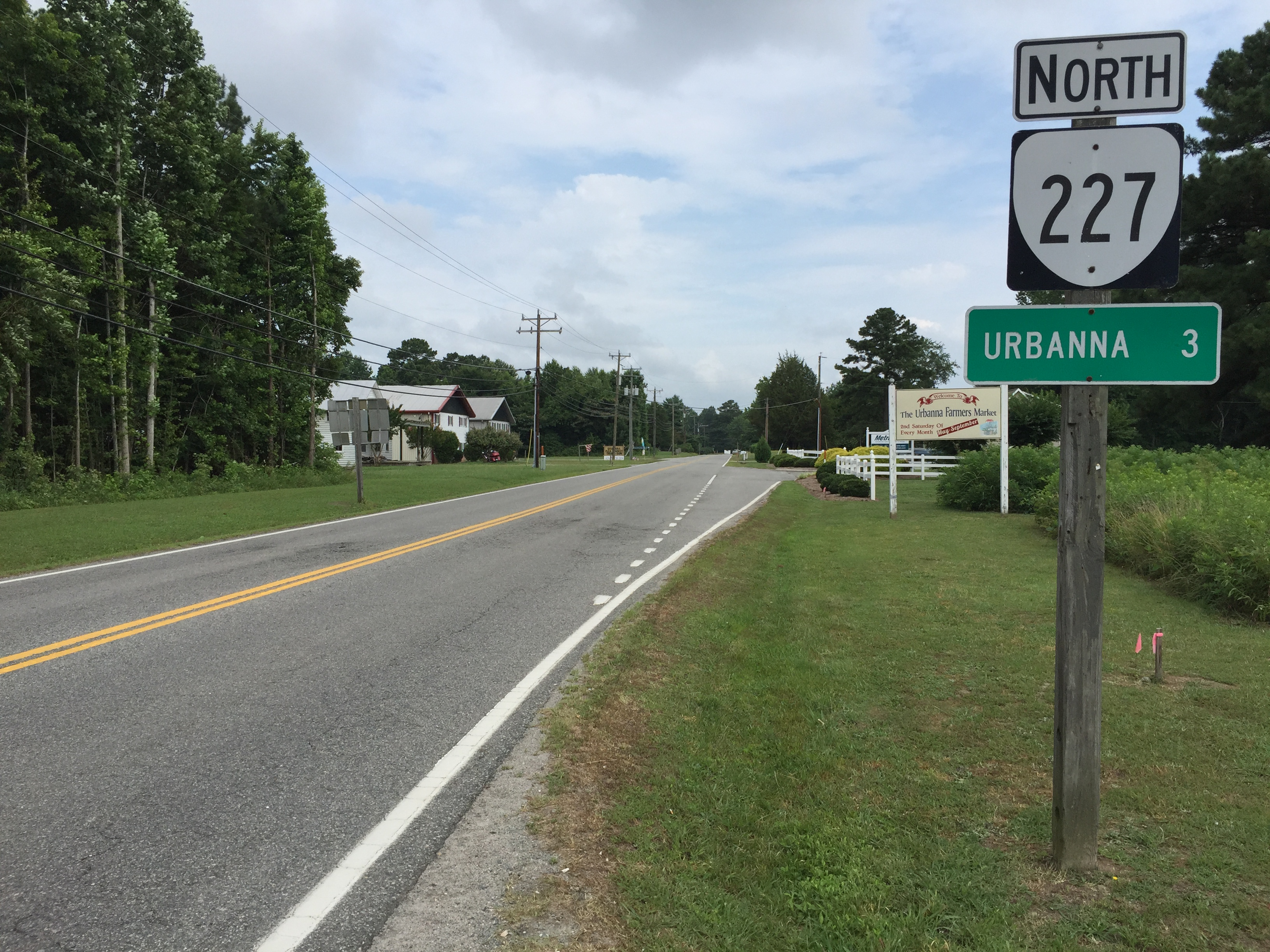
View north at the south end of SR 227 at SR 33 and SR 641 near Saluda

SR 227 begins at an intersection with SR 33 (Lewis Puller Memorial Highway) east of Saluda. The state highway heads north as two-lane undivided Urbanna Road, which passes through a mix of forest and farmland. SR 227 crosses Urbanna Creek, a tributary of the Rappahannock River, into the town of Urbanna and veers west onto Watling Street. The state highway makes a right-angle turn north onto Cross Street and, two blocks later, a right-angle turn west onto Virginia Street. SR 227 follows Virginia Street west to its western terminus at the western town limit of Urbanna west of Waverly Road. The roadway continues as SR 602 (Old Virginia Street) to U.S. Route 17 (Tidewater Trail) northwest of Saluda.

== Major intersections ==
The entire route is in Middlesex County.

| Location | mi | km | Destinations | Notes |
|---|---|---|---|---|
| Cooks Corner | 0.00 | 0.00 | SR 33 (Lewis Puller Highway) / SR 641 south (Old Courthouse Road) – Deltaville, Saluda | Southern terminus |
| Urbanna | 2.98 | 4.80 | SR 602 (Old Virginia Street) | Western town limit of Urbanna; northern terminus |
1.000 mi = 1.609 km; 1.000 km = 0.621 mi
