= 1901 Virginia gubernatorial election =

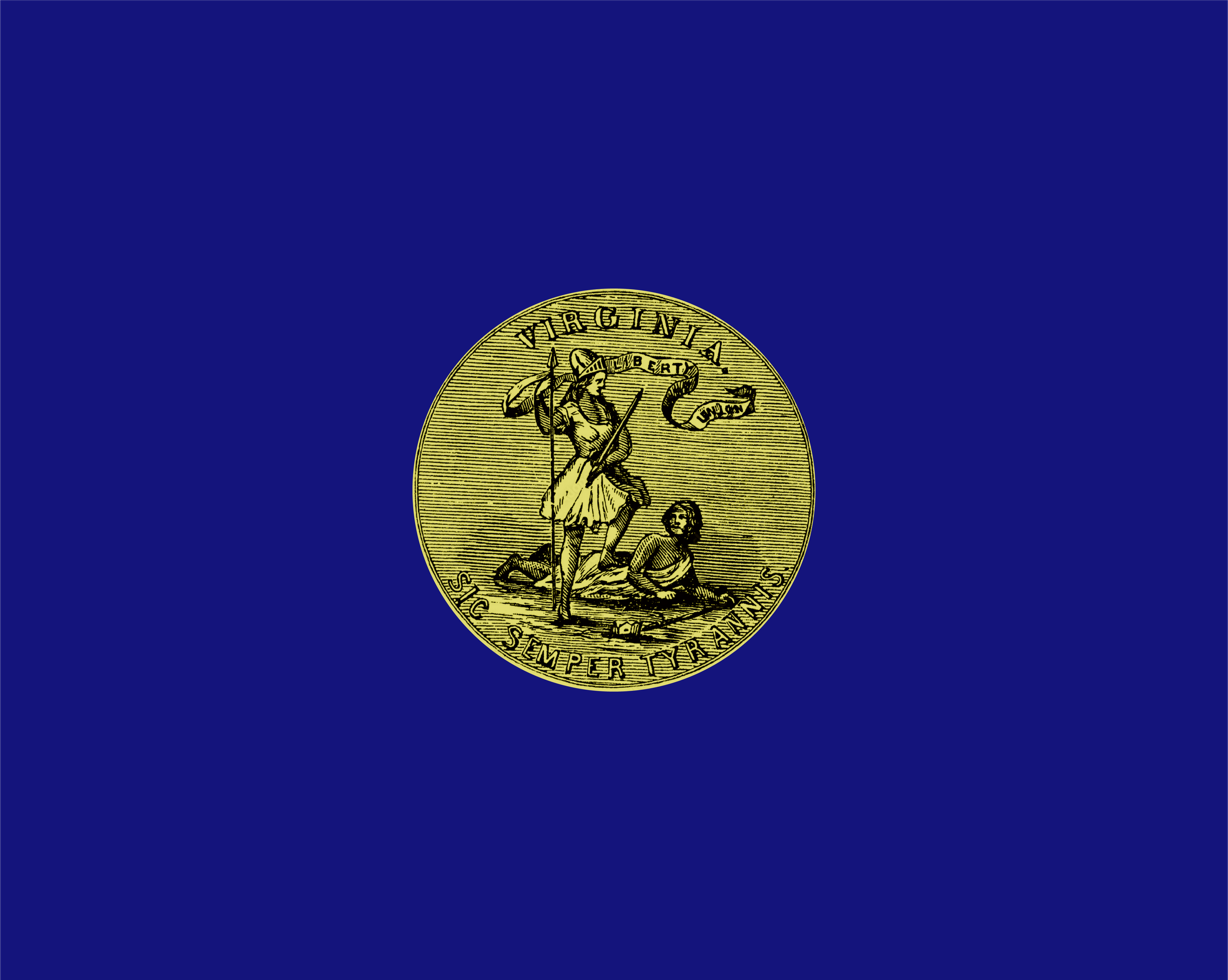
- November 5, 1901
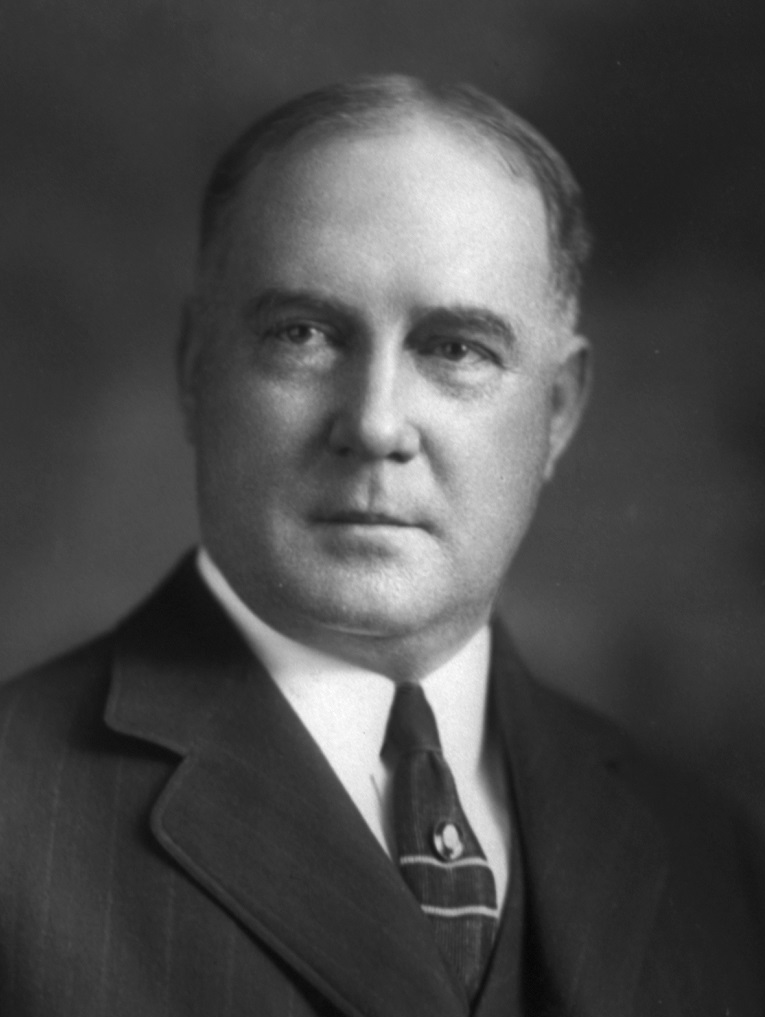

Nominee	Andrew Jackson Montague	John Hampton Hoge
Party	Democratic	Republican
Popular vote	116,691	81,366
Percentage	58.20%	40.58%
- County results Montague: 40–50% 50–60% 60–70% 70–80% 80–90% 90–100% Hoge: 40–50% 50–60% 60–70%
Governor before election
James Hoge Tyler
Democratic
Elected Governor
Andrew Jackson Montague
Democratic

The 1901 Virginia gubernatorial election was held on November 5, 1901, to elect the governor of Virginia.

== Results ==
Virginia gubernatorial election, 1901
Party	Candidate	Votes	%
Democratic	Andrew Jackson Montague	116,691	58.20%
Republican	John Hampton Hoge	81,366	40.58%
Prohibition	O. C. Rucker	1,896	0.95%
Socialist Labor	H. D. McTier	285	0.14%
Socialist Labor	J. J. Quantz	280	0.14%
Total votes		200,518	100.00%
Democratic hold			
