= Pinewoods (Lightfoot, Virginia) =

Historic house in Virginia, United States

- U.S. National Register of Historic Places
- Virginia Landmarks Register
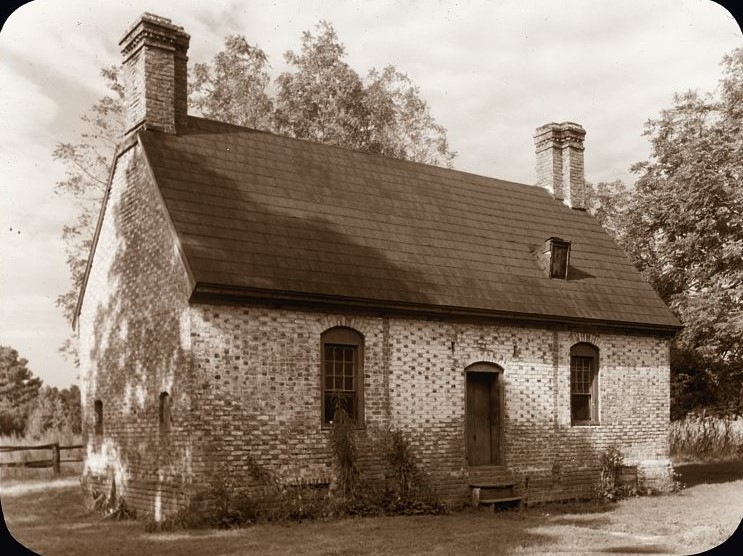
- Warburton dependency, by Frances Benjamin Johnston, ca. 1930s

- Location within Virginia Location within the United States
- Location: 1.4 mi. SW of jct. of VA 613 and 614, near Lightfoot, Virginia
- Coordinates: 37°16′18″N 76°49′38″W
- Area: 140 acres (57 ha)
- Architectural style: Colonial
- NRHP reference No.: 71000983
- VLR No.: 047-0014

Significant dates
- Added to NRHP: November 12, 1971
- Designated VLR: October 6, 1970

Pinewoods, also known as Warburton House, is a historic home located near Lightfoot, James City County, Virginia. The house dates to the late-17th century, and is a 1 1/2-story, early Colonial brick dwelling. It has a gable roof with dormers and features two very fine T-shaped chimney stacks.

Edmund Ware Warburton (1861–1919) was for a long time a member of the James City school board; from 1899 to 1904 he was a member of the Williamsburg city council and twice mayor of the city.

It was listed on the National Register of Historic Places in 1971.

== See also ==
- List of the oldest buildings in Virginia
