= Topping, Virginia =

Unincorporated community in Virginia, United States

- Unincorporated community
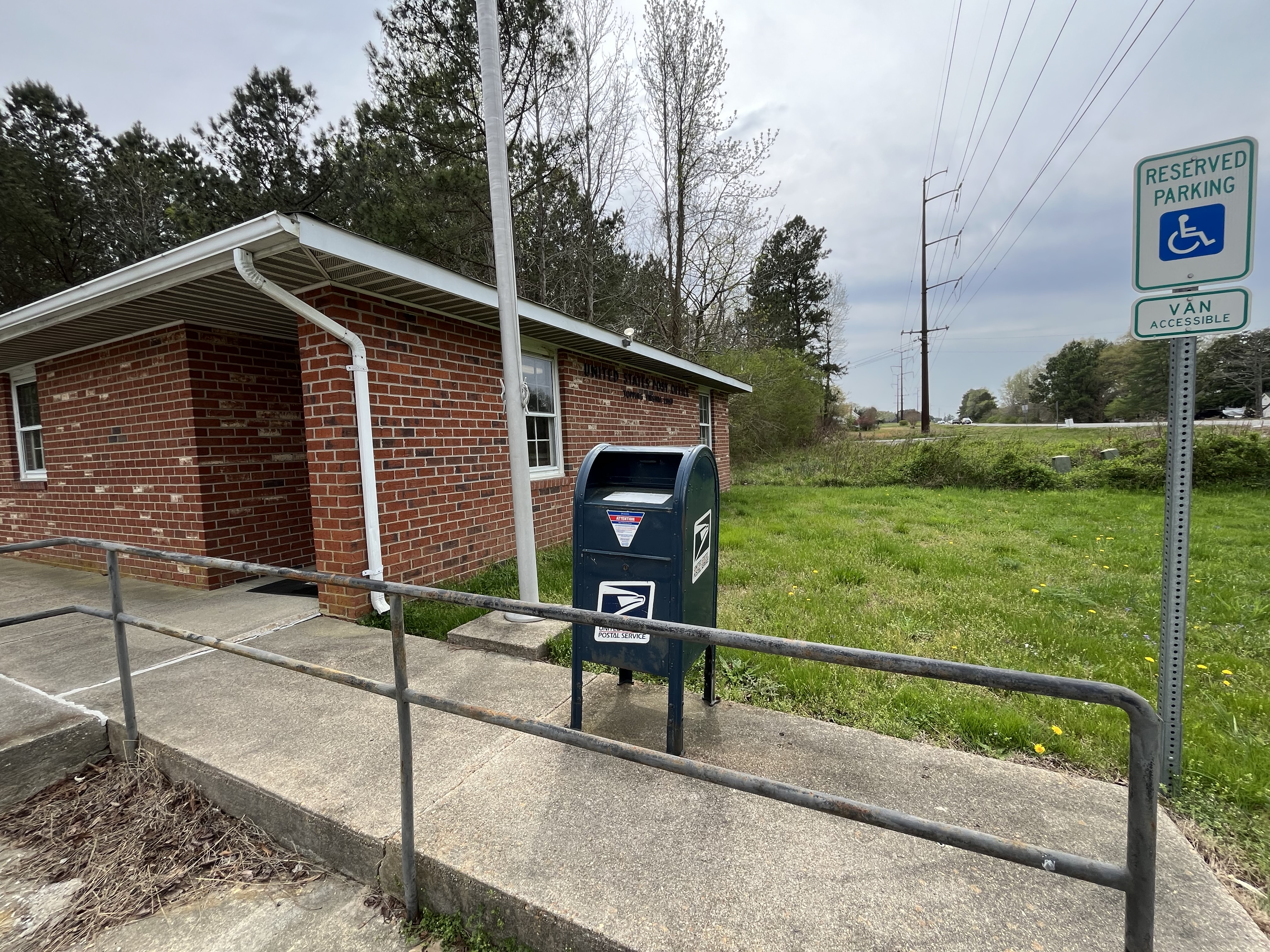
- The post office in Topping

- Location within Virginia Location within the United States
- Coordinates: 37°35′17″N 76°28′28″W
- Country: United States
- State: Virginia
- County: Middlesex
- Elevation: 46 ft (14 m)
- Time zone: UTC−5 (Eastern (EST))
  - Summer (DST): UTC−4 (EDT)
- ZIP code: 23169
- Area code: 804
- GNIS feature ID: 1475786

Topping is an unincorporated community in Middlesex County, Virginia, United States. Topping is located on Virginia State Route 3 6.75 miles (10.86 km) east of Saluda. Topping has a post office with ZIP code 23169.

Topping is home to Hummel Field, an airfield created by Fred Hummel, a member of the Early Birds of Aviation, in 1925. Hummel then donated the site to Middlesex County in 1970.

Prospect, a historic plantation house, was listed on the National Register of Historic Places in 2004.
