= Urbanna Historic District =

Archaeological site in Virginia, United States

- U.S. National Register of Historic Places
- U.S. Historic district
- Virginia Landmarks Register
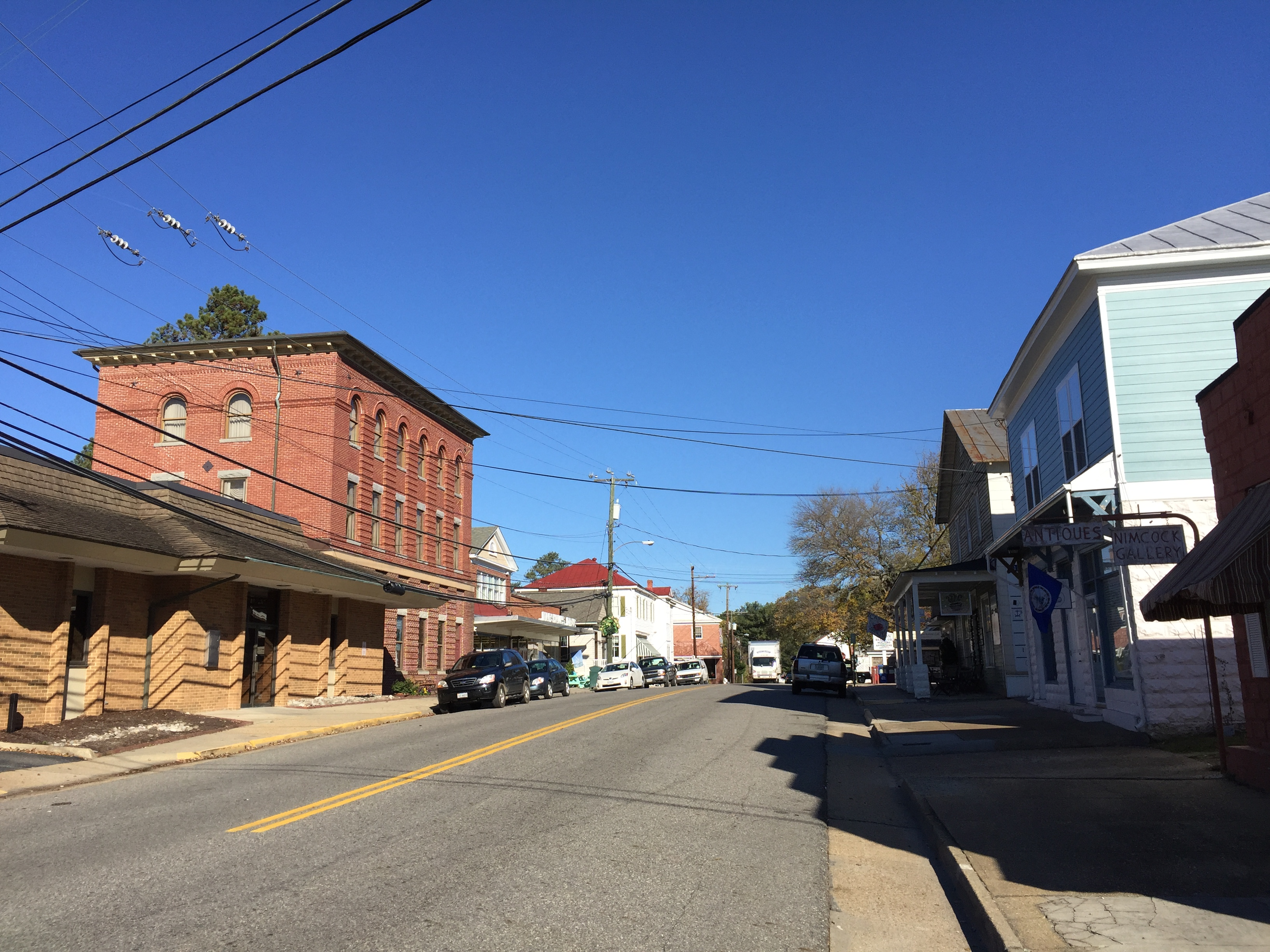
- The Urbanna Historic District, viewed from Cross Street

- Location within Virginia Location within the United States
- Location: Roughly bounded by Virginia St., Rappahannock Ave., Watling St. and Urbanna Cr., Urbanna, Virginia
- Coordinates: 37°38′08″N 76°34′27″W
- Area: 72 acres (29 ha)
- Architect: Palmer, Charles H.
- Architectural style: Colonial Revival, Queen Anne, Federal
- NRHP reference No.: 90002196
- VLR No.: 316-0009

Significant dates
- Added to NRHP: February 7, 1991
- Designated VLR: August 21, 1990

Urbanna Historic District is a national historic district in Urbanna, Middlesex County, Virginia. It has 65 contributing buildings and 1 contributing site in the central business district and surrounding residential areas of Urbanna. Buildings include the Old Tavern, Gressitt House (c. 1820), Genders House (1876), Fitchett (1884), Van Wagenen House (c. 1900), C. H. Palmer Garage (c. 1930), Sentinel Building, Urbanna Town Office, Taylor Hardware (1921–1925), Bank of Middlesex (1900–1901), Urbanna Baptist Church (1896), Located in the district and separately listed are the Old Courthouse, Lansdowne, James Mills Storehouse, Sandwich, and Wormeley Cottage.

It was listed on the National Register of Historic Places in 1991.
