= Dogham, Doggams =

Historic house in Virginia, United States

- U.S. National Register of Historic Places
- Virginia Landmarks Register
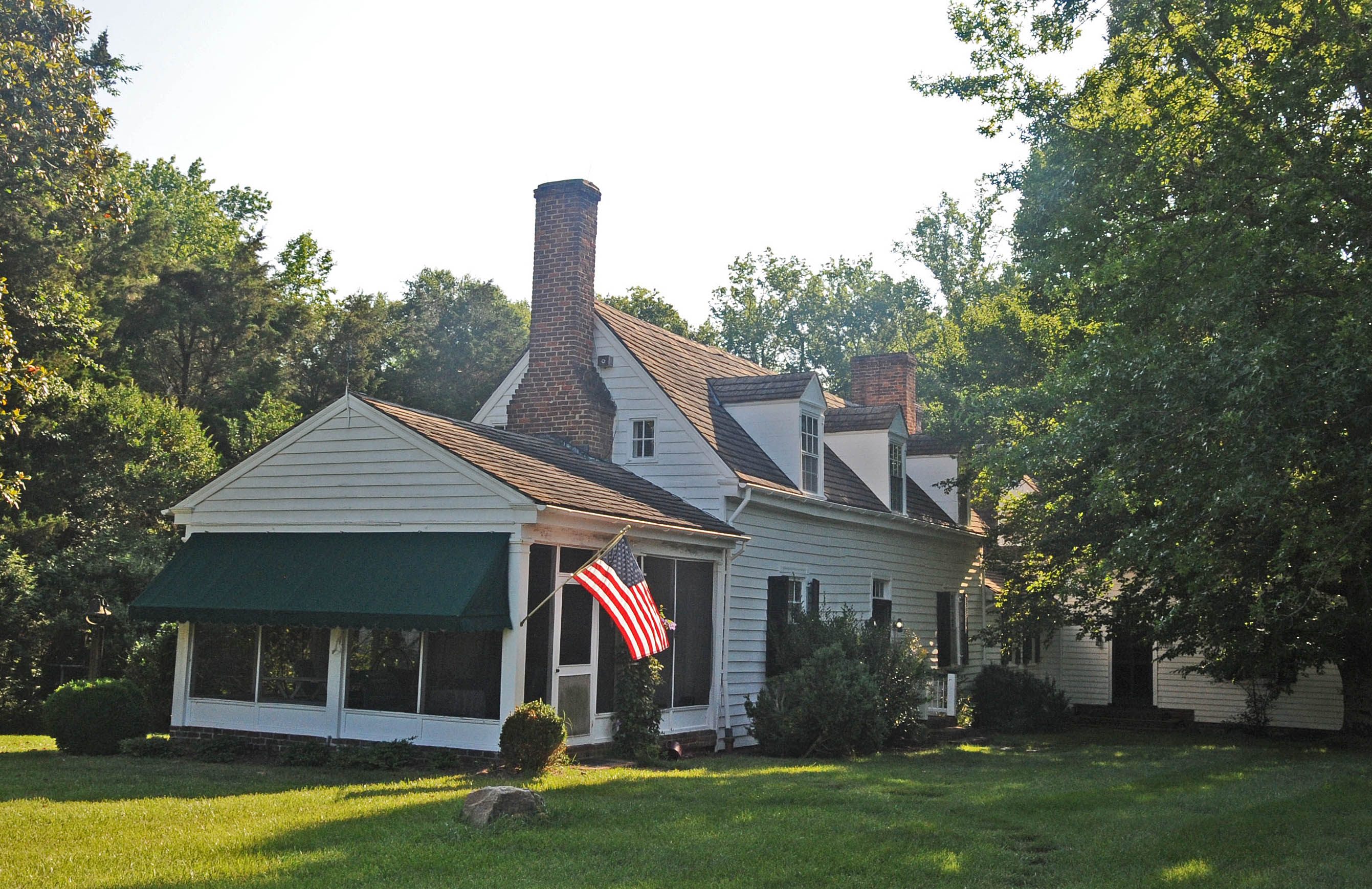

- Location within Virginia Location within the United States
- Location: 1601 Dogham Ln., Charles City, Virginia
- Coordinates: 37°21′43″N 77°14′01″W
- Area: 750 acres (300 ha)
- Built: 1642
- Architectural style: Colonial, Colonial Revival
- NRHP reference No.: 99001200
- VLR No.: 018-0059

Significant dates
- Added to NRHP: September 24, 1999
- Designated VLR: June 16, 1999

Dogham Farm, previously known as Doggams, is a historic home and farm located in Charles City, Charles City County, Virginia. In 1642, Joseph Royall patented 600 acres on the north side of the James River in Charles City County. The plantation he named "Doggams" later became known as "Dogham" in the 18th century. Following the death of Joseph Royall, his widow married Henry Isham. Dogham is notable not only for its antiquity but also for its continuous ownership and occupation by the same family - the property remains in the Royall and Isham lines today.

== Home & Architecture ==
Dogham is representative of the simple houses that abounded in the Virginia Colonial period. The house is a rambling 1 1/2-story frame structure, roughly L-shaped in plan. The original section is a typical Virginia vernacular three-bay I-house with three dormer windows on each side of a gable roof between exterior end chimneys. This central portion consists of an entrance hall, dining room, upstairs bedroom, and basement below (former kitchen), each with a fireplace. The Royall family thought this to be built in 1652, however architectural historians from Colonial Williamsburg believe it was likely built after 1700. Additional expansions occurred in the early 1700s.

Major restorations in the mid-19th century include many of the present architectural details. In 1941, the house was expanded, adding a kitchen wing, children's dining room, 5 bedrooms, 4 bathrooms, and game and service rooms. The Charles Gillette-planned garden was also developed at this time.

== Grounds ==
Also located on the property is a contributing farm complex with two cottages and a garage-shop, all built in the 1940s, and a chicken house, stable, and barn built in the 1930s. The property also includes a family cemetery and the remains of a brick manufactory that operated from the 1840s to the 1890s.

== Historical Context ==
Situated between Malvern Hill and Berkeley Plantation, Dogham was inevitably involved in the Civil War. In 1862, U.S. General McClellan made his headquarters in a gunboat on the James River, several hundred yards from Dogham's bluffs. Charles City tax records for 1865 carry a notation that Dogham taxes were reduced due to war-time damages.

Plowed fields frequently yield arrowheads, bullets, shell fragments, buttons and other artifacts.

== Present Day ==
Today, Dogham Farm comprises 750 acres and is on the National Register of Historic Places, and Virginia Landmarks Register. As a Virginia Century Farm, Dogham is protected from future development by a conservation easement held by the Virginia Outdoors Foundation and the James River Association.

Dogham is now a private family residence not open to the public.

== See also ==
- List of the oldest buildings in Virginia
