= Deer Chase =

Historic house in Virginia, United States

- U.S. National Register of Historic Places
- Virginia Landmarks Register
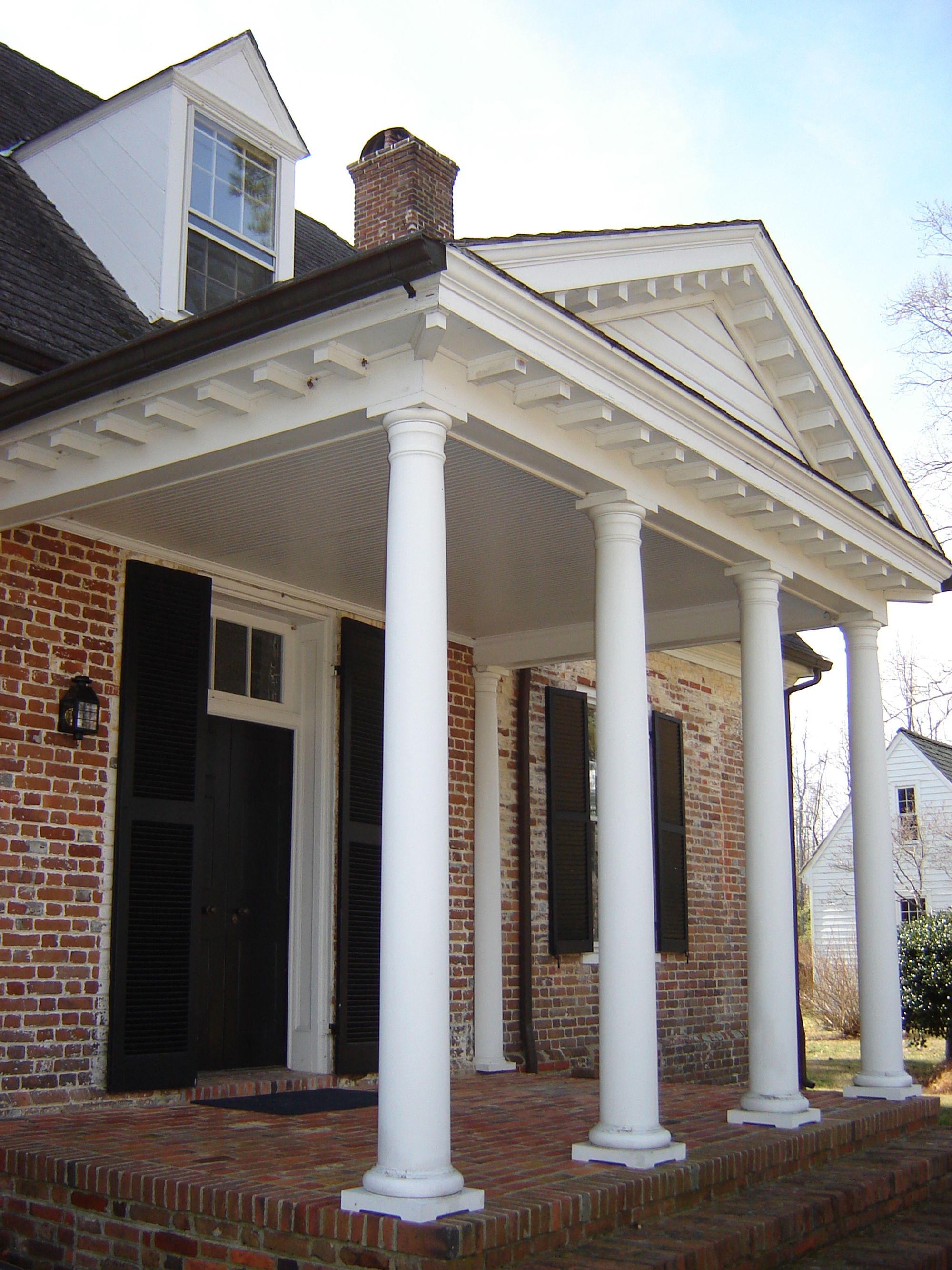
- Deer Chase, February 2008

- Location within Virginia Location within the United States
- Location: Southeast of Saluda off VA 629, near Saluda, Virginia
- Coordinates: 37°34′27″N 76°32′28″W
- Area: 30 acres (12 ha)
- Built: c. 1750
- NRHP reference No.: 73002039
- VLR No.: 059-0017

Significant dates
- Added to NRHP: August 14, 1973
- Designated VLR: June 19, 1973

Deer Chase is a historic plantation house located near Saluda, Middlesex County, Virginia. It was constructed about 1750, and is a 1 1/2-story, three-bay, brick dwelling with a clipped gable roof. The interior has a central hall plan. Also on the property is a contributing three-bay frame school house.

It was listed on the National Register of Historic Places in 1973.
