= Sessions–Pope–Sheild House =

Historic house in Virginia, United States

- U.S. National Register of Historic Places
- Virginia Landmarks Register
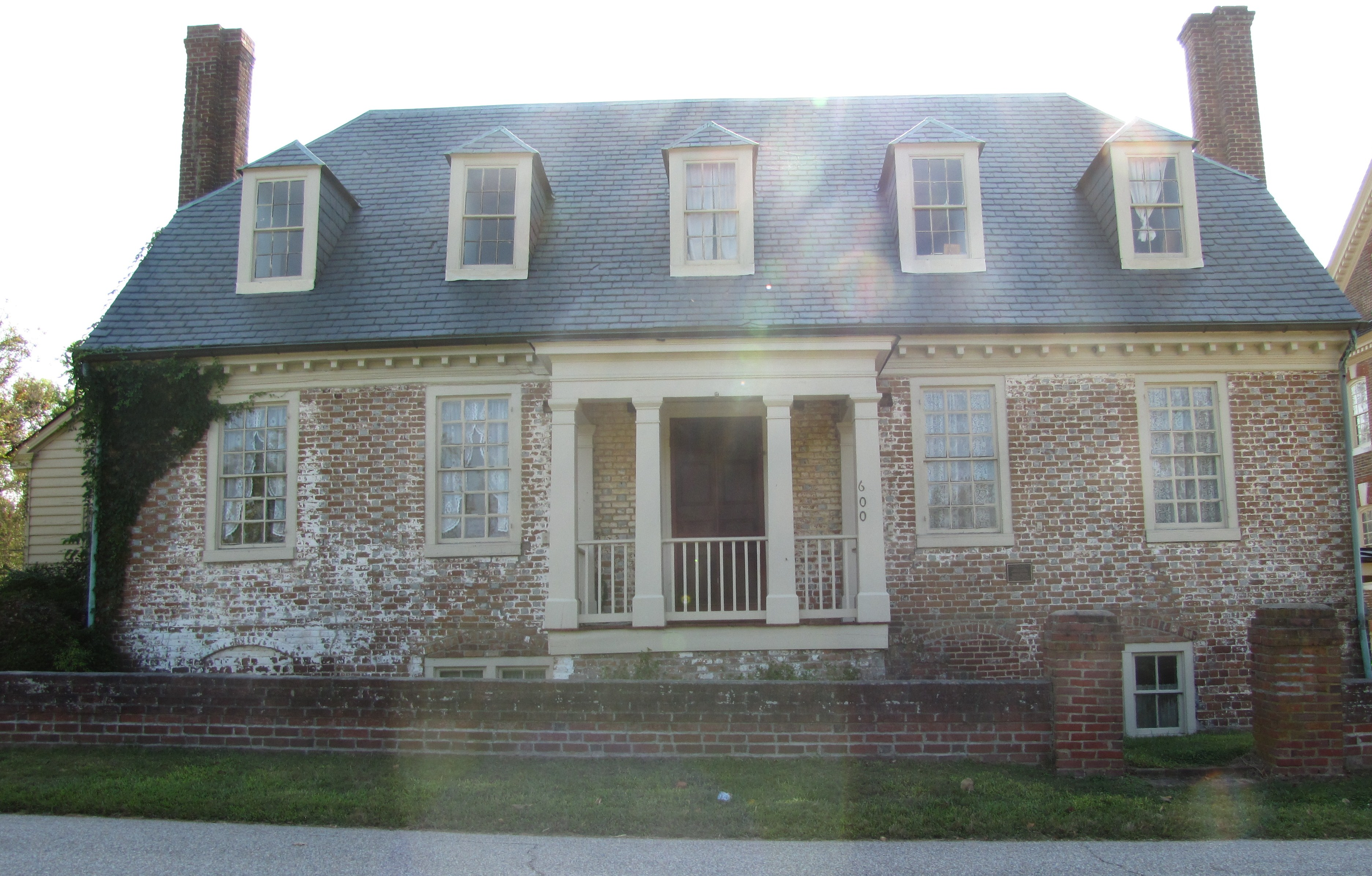

- Location within Virginia Location within the United States
- Location: 600 Main St., Yorktown, Virginia
- Coordinates: 37.2341°N 76.5069°W
- Area: 0.5 acres (0.20 ha)
- Built: circa 1766
- Architectural style: Colonial, Georgian
- NRHP reference No.: 03000572
- VLR No.: 099-0019

Significant dates
- Added to NRHP: June 23, 2003
- Designated VLR: September 11, 2002

The Sessions–Pope–Sheild House, also known as Sessions House or Sheild House, is a historic home located at Yorktown, York County, Virginia. It is thought to have been built in or shortly after 1766, and is a 1 1/2-story, five-bay by two bay, brick Southern Colonial dwelling. It has a clipped gable roof with dormers. It has two T-shaped end chimney. Also on the property is a contributing archaeological site.

It was added to the National Register of Historic Places in 2003.
