= Sandwich (Urbanna, Virginia) =

Historic house in Virginia, United States

- U.S. National Register of Historic Places
- U.S. Historic district – Contributing property
- Virginia Landmarks Register
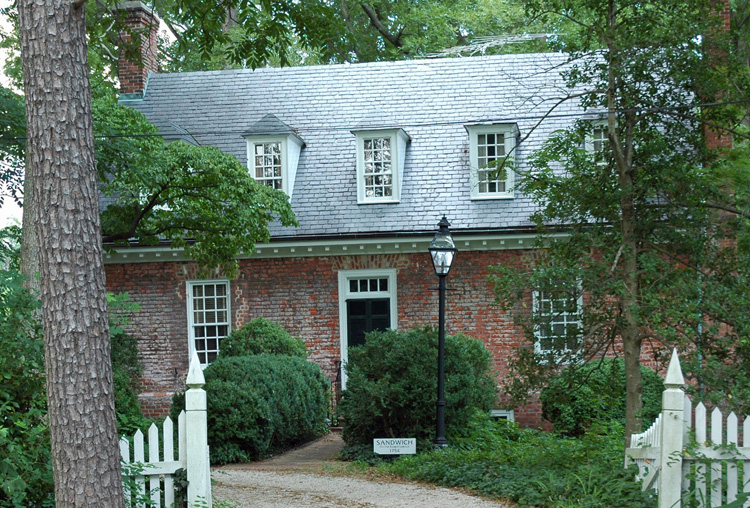
- Sandwich cottage, July 2006

- Location within Virginia Location within the United States
- Location: 131 Virginia St., Urbanna, Virginia
- Coordinates: 37°38′20″N 76°34′20″W
- Area: 6 acres (2.4 ha)
- Built: 1758
- Built by: Unknown; Gordon, John
- Architectural style: Georgian, Colonial Revival, Southern Colonial
- NRHP reference No.: 08000390
- VLR No.: 316-0001

Significant dates
- Added to NRHP: May 8, 2008
- Designated VLR: March 20, 2008

Sandwich, also known as the Old Customs House, is a historic home located at Urbanna, Middlesex County, Virginia. It was built about 1758, and is a three bay rectangular plan brick structure built into the side of a steep hill with 1 1/2 stories on the west up-hill facade, and 2 1/2 stories on the east side. The house was renovated in the 1930s. Also on the property are a contributing brick wall, and a formal boxwood garden site, which includes four contributing garden buildings. Andrew Jackson Montague purchased the property in 1934. It is considered by many historians to be one of the oldest remaining buildings in the Urbanna Historic District.

It was listed on the National Register of Historic Places in 2008.
