= Wormeley Cottage =

Historic house in Virginia, United States

- U.S. National Register of Historic Places
- U.S. Historic district – Contributing property
- Virginia Landmarks Register
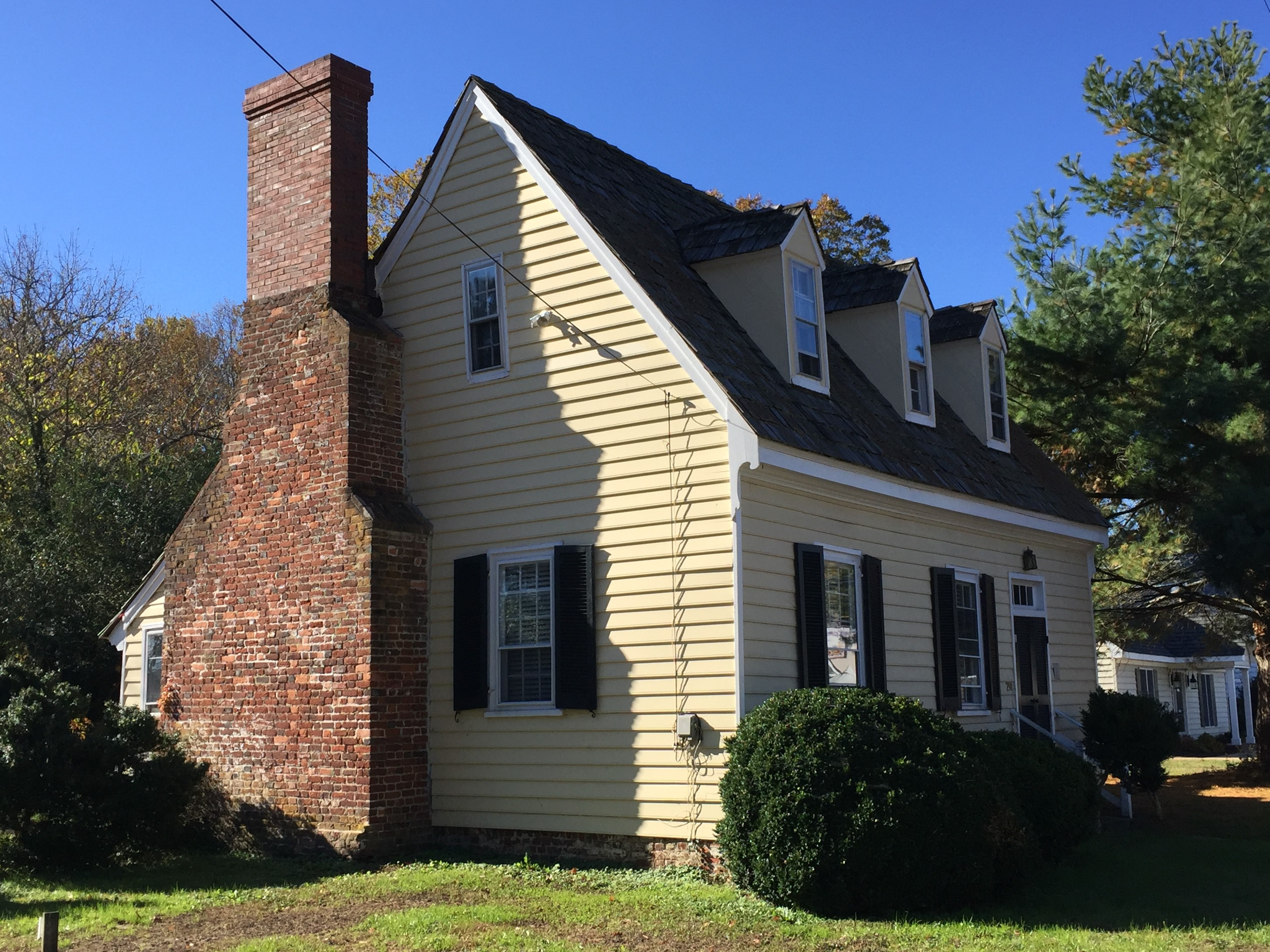

- Location within Virginia Location within the United States
- Location: Virginia St., Urbanna, Virginia
- Coordinates: 37°38′8″N 76°34′41″W
- Area: 0.5 acres (0.20 ha)
- Built: c. 1750
- NRHP reference No.: 80004201
- VLR No.: 316-0006

Significant dates
- Added to NRHP: May 23, 1980
- Designated VLR: December 20, 1977

Wormeley Cottage, also known as the Wormeley-Montague House, is a historic home located at Urbanna, Middlesex County, Virginia. One of the few remaining 18th-century buildings, it was built on orders of Ralph Wormeley about 1750, when the port town was established. He sold several town lots, including the cottage, in 1770 to James Mills.

The 1 1/2-story dwelling features three bays and a frame side-passage plan. The narrow gable roof includes dormers and features an asymmetrical chimney. The recent renovation by Robert Montague III also installed a solar heating unit, one of the first to be installed on a historic property in Virginia. It was listed on the National Register of Historic Places in 1980. It is located in the Urbanna Historic District.
