= Prospect (Topping, Virginia) =

Historic house in Virginia, United States

- U.S. National Register of Historic Places
- Virginia Landmarks Register
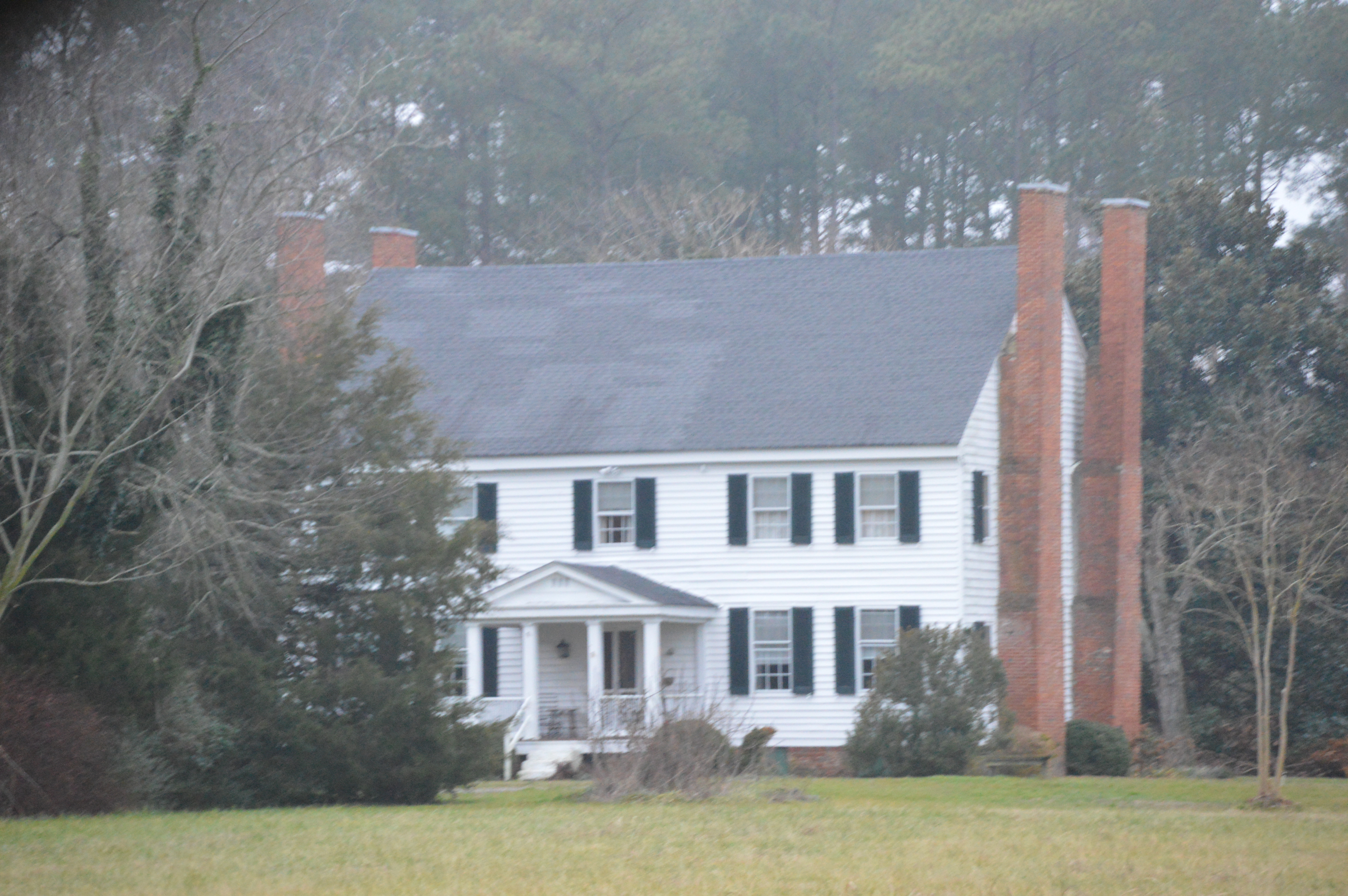
- Roadside view

- Location within Virginia Location within the United States
- Location: 2847 Grey's Point Rd., Topping, Virginia
- Coordinates: 37°36′1.5″N 76°26′39.5″W
- Area: 8 acres (3.2 ha)
- Built: c. 1849
- Architectural style: Federal
- NRHP reference No.: 04000480
- VLR No.: 059-0025

Significant dates
- Added to NRHP: May 19, 2004
- Designated VLR: March 17, 2004

Prospect is a historic plantation house located near Topping, Middlesex County, Virginia. The house was constructed between 1820 and 1850, and is a 2 1/2-story, five-bay, frame dwelling with a gable roof in the Federal style. Two 38-foot chimneys abut each end of the house and the front and rear facades have identical gable-roofed porticos. Also on the property are the contributing 19th-century carriage house, an early 1900s farm shed, and the original brick-lined well.

It was listed on the National Register of Historic Places in 2004.
