= Middlesex County Courthouse (Saluda, Virginia) =

Historic courthouse in Virginia, US

- U.S. National Register of Historic Places
- Virginia Landmarks Register
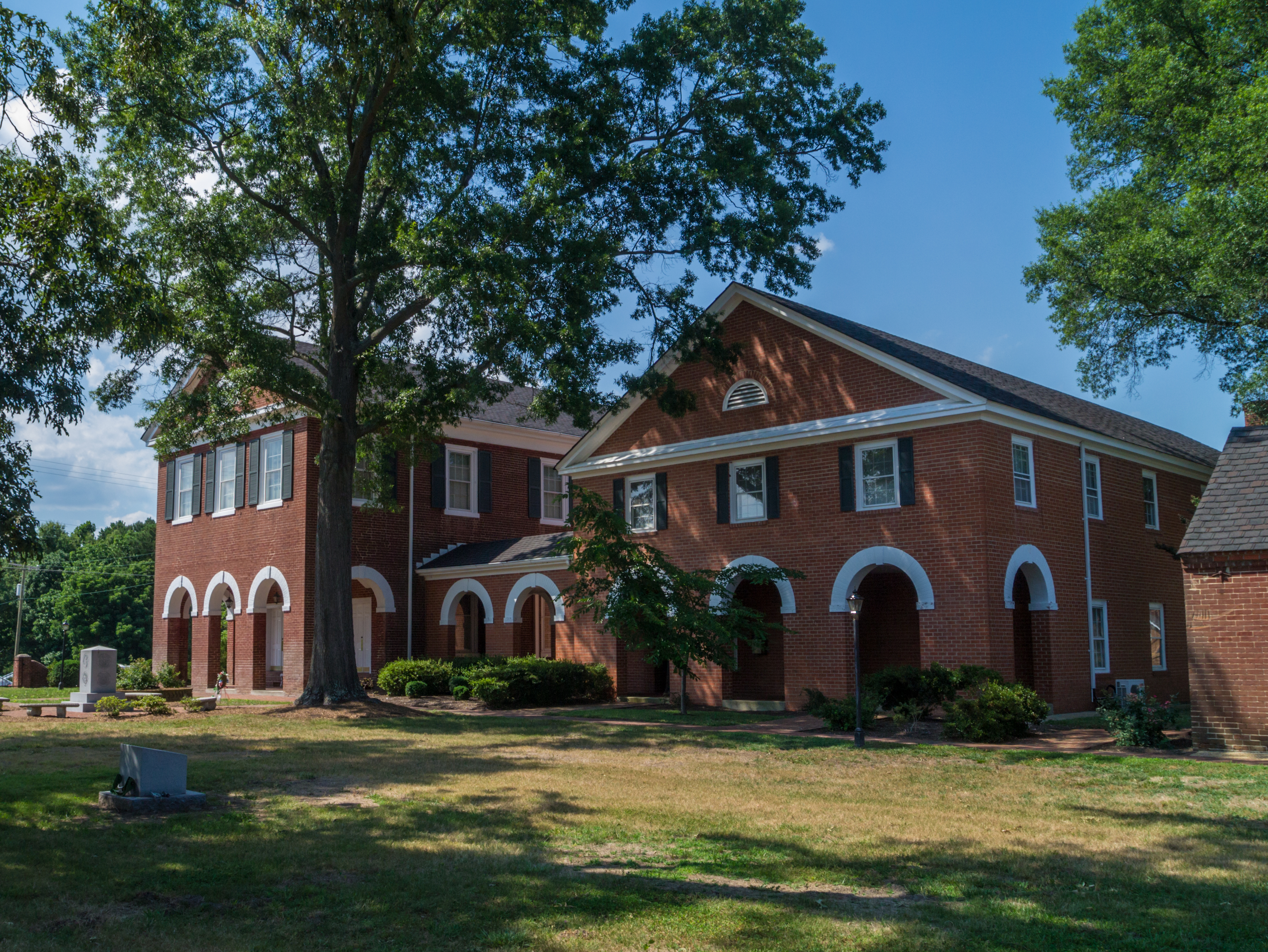

- Location within Virginia Location within the United States
- Interactive map showing the location of Middlesex County Courthouse, Saluda
- Location: Jct. of U.S. 17, Saluda, Virginia
- Coordinates: 37°36′23″N 76°35′42″W
- Area: 2 acres (0.81 ha)
- Built: 1852
- Built by: Hill, John P.; Jones, William R.
- NRHP reference No.: 78003029
- VLR No.: 059-0008

Significant dates
- Added to NRHP: November 21, 1978
- Designated VLR: April 18, 1978

The Middlesex County Courthouse in Saluda, Virginia was built in 1852. It was listed on the National Register of Historic Places (NRHP) in 1978. The courthouse building "is a late but significant example of the arcaded-plan courthouse which had its precedent in Virginia's colonial courthouses and earliest civic buildings."

The NRHP listing included three contributing buildings: the courthouse, a clerk's office, and a jail. And it included one other contributing structure, which is a Confederate Civil War monument.

John P. Hill was builder of the courthouse building and was paid $1.010.95 out of a sheriff's levy of taxpayers to provide for that purpose. William R. Jones was builder of the jail.

== See also ==
- Middlesex County Courthouse (Urbanna, Virginia), its colonial era precedent also known as Old Middlesex County Courthouse, which was built starting in 1745.
