= Christ Church (Saluda, Virginia) =

Historic church in Virginia, United States

- U.S. National Register of Historic Places
- Virginia Landmarks Register
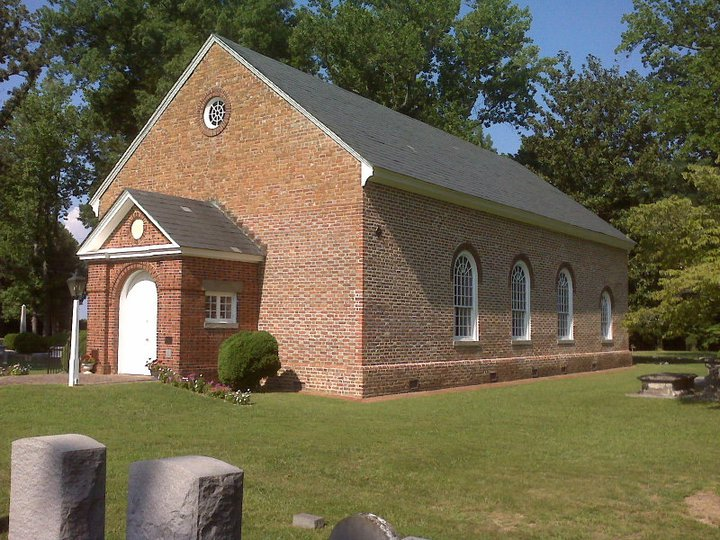
- Facade

- Location within Virginia Location within the United States
- Location: Off VA 638, north of the junction with VA 33, Saluda, Virginia
- Coordinates: 37°36′34″N 76°32′48″W
- Area: 9 acres (3.6 ha)
- Built: 1720s
- Restored: 1843
- NRHP reference No.: 72001408
- VLR No.: 059-0002

Significant dates
- Added to NRHP: November 3, 1972
- Designated VLR: March 21, 1972

Christ Church is a historic Episcopal church located at Saluda, Middlesex County, Virginia. The present building was constructed in the 1720s, and is a one-story, rectangular brick building with a gable roof. It measures 60 feet by 33 feet, 6 inches.

Although relatively plain, the church's interior was richly furnished in colonial times. After the Anglican church was disestablished in Virginia following the American Revolution, the church building was abandoned, and it fell into ruin. During this period, all interior furnishings, the roof, and the upper part of the walls were lost. The flemish bond walls of the church, however, remained standing.

The parish was revived in 1840, and the church was restored in 1843. A gable-roofed vestibule added, which today bears an inscription bearing the date 1714 (previously thought to be the date of construction and 1843).

Burials in the churchyard include Congressman Andrew Jackson Montague and Chesty Puller.

The church was listed on the National Register of Historic Places in 1972.

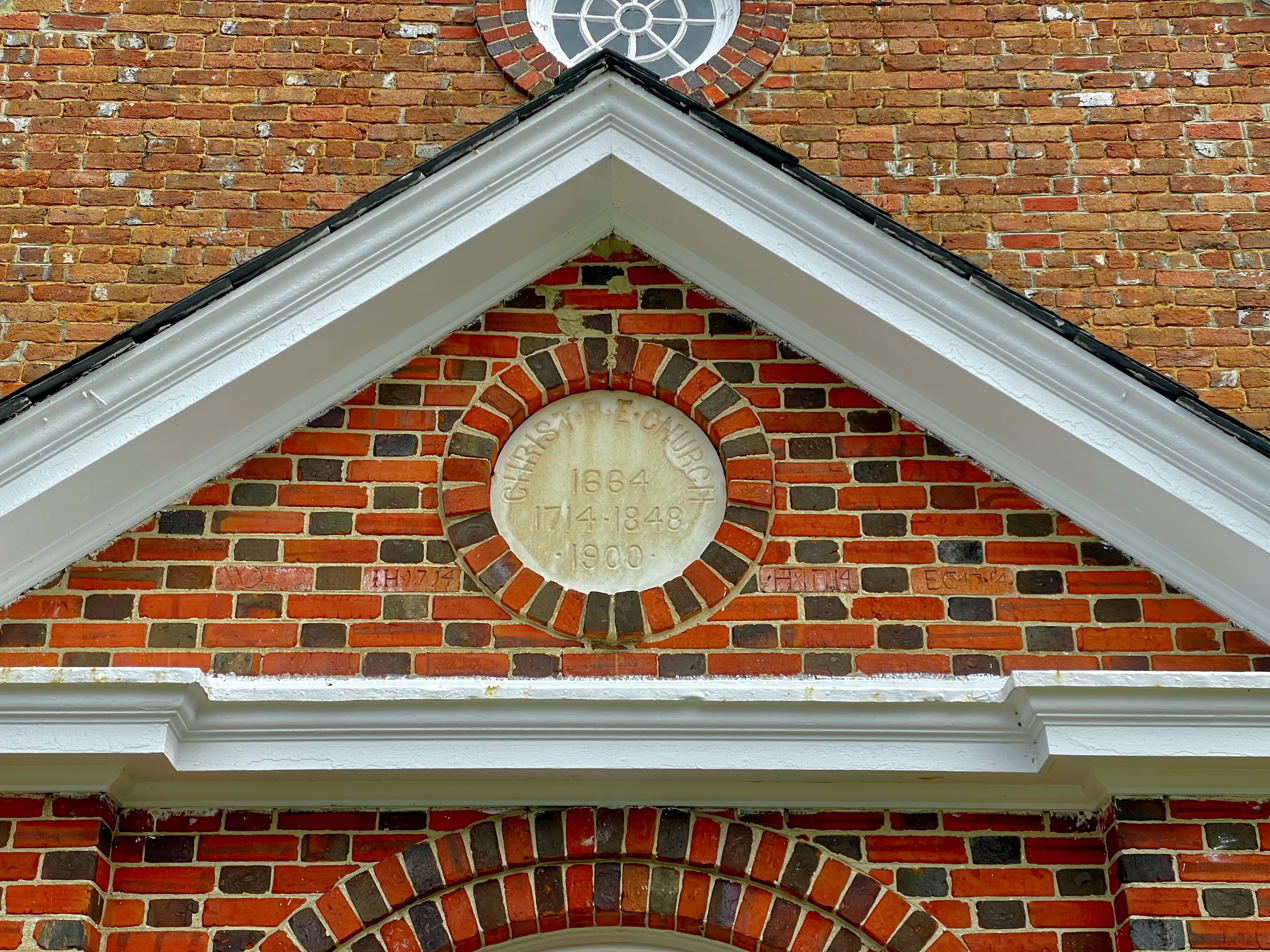
The inscription on the vestibule added in 1843.
