= Mary Anne Wales House =

Historic house in New Hampshire, United States

- U.S. National Register of Historic Places
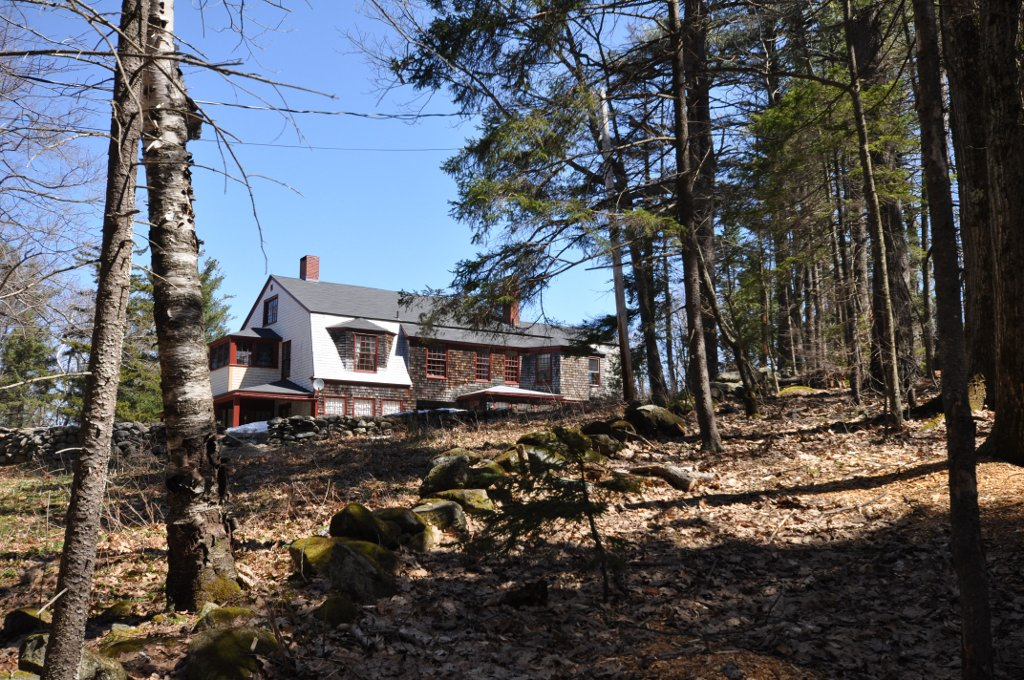

- Location within New Hampshire Location within the United States
- Location: Snow Hill Rd., Dublin, New Hampshire
- Coordinates: 42°54′14″N 72°4′1″W
- Built: 1886
- Built by: Brockway, James
- Architectural style: Shingle Style
- MPS: Dublin MRA
- NRHP reference No.: 83004085
- Added to NRHP: December 18, 1983

The Mary Anne Wales House, also known as The Briar-Patch, is a historic house on Snow Hill Road in Dublin, New Hampshire. Built in 1886, it is a well-preserved local example of the Shingle style, and an early residence of the town's late 19th-century summer resort colony. The house was listed on the National Register of Historic Places in 1983.

== Description and history ==
The Mary Anne Wales House is located between Dublin's village center and Dublin Pond, on the ridge of Snow Hill east of Snow Hill Road a short way south of New Hampshire Route 101. The house is sited to afford commanding views to both the east and west, with views of the pond and nearby mountains. It is a 2 1/2-story frame structure, with a gambrel roof and shingled exterior. Its basic rectangular form is augmented by a variety of projections, including a polygonal two-story bay on the west (front) facade, and a two-story porch on the south side.

The house was built in 1886 for Miss Mary Anne Wales of Boston, Massachusetts, who had been summering in Dublin for twenty years before having this house built. The property also includes a barn from the same period, a "stable house" built in 1934, and a studio built in 1959. Owners of the house have played host to a number of notable musicians, including conductor Serge Koussevitsky and violinist Jascha Heifetz.

== See also ==
- National Register of Historic Places listings in Cheshire County, New Hampshire
