= Weblin House =

Historic house in Virginia, United States

- U.S. National Register of Historic Places
- Virginia Landmarks Register
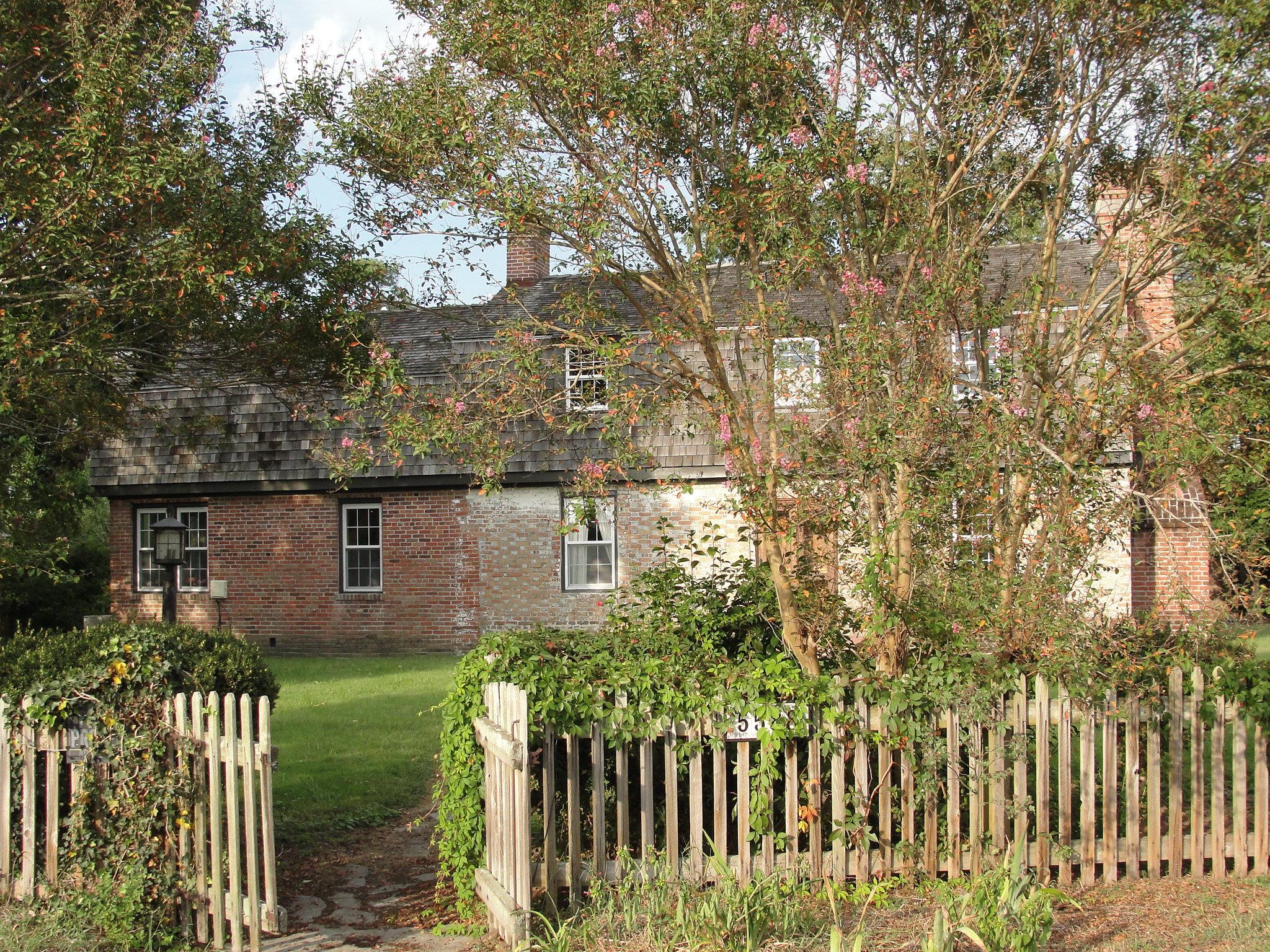
- Weblin House, September 2012

- Location within Virginia Location within the United States
- Location: 5588 Moore's Pond Rd., Virginia Beach, Virginia
- Coordinates: 36°52′23″N 76°10′10″W
- Area: 135 acres (55 ha)
- Built: c. 1653
- Architectural style: Colonial, Pre-Georgian vernacular
- NRHP reference No.: 74002248; 100012916 (decrease)
- VLR No.: 134-0035

Significant dates
- Added to NRHP: November 8, 1974
- Boundary decrease: April 16, 2026
- Designated VLR: February 19, 1974

Weblin House is a historic home located at Virginia Beach, Virginia. It was built in 1653, and is a 1 1/2-story, three-bay, Colonial-era vernacular brick farmhouse. It is topped by a gambrel roof (the original gable roof was replaced after a fire) and has two massive exterior-end chimneys with a T-shaped stack and cap. A modern two-story brick wing is attached to the south end.

It was added to the National Register of Historic Places in 1974.
