= Middlesex County Courthouse (Urbanna, Virginia) =

Historic courthouse in Virginia, US

- U.S. National Register of Historic Places
- U.S. Historic district – Contributing property
- Virginia Landmarks Register
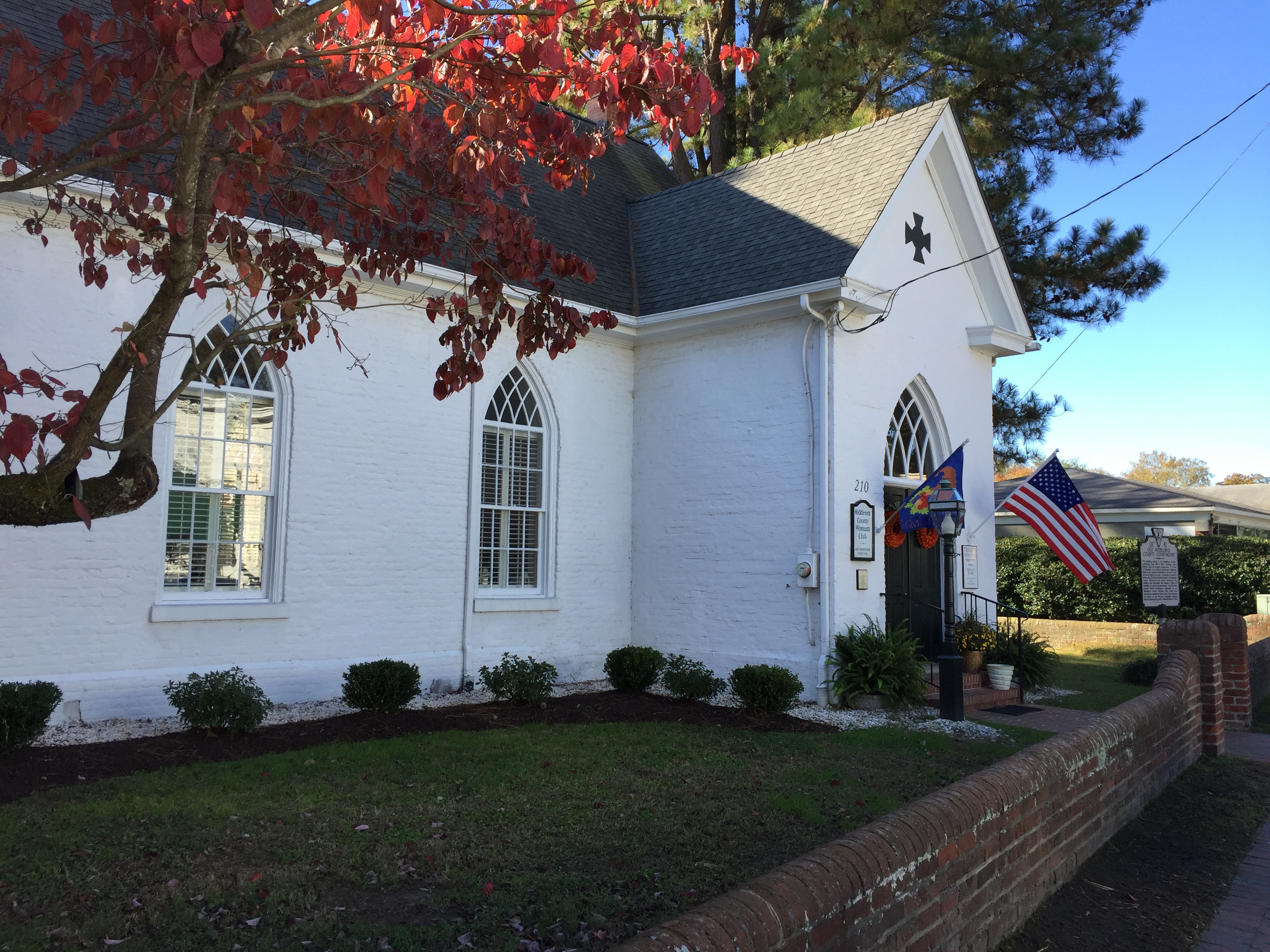

- Location within Virginia Location within the United States
- Interactive map showing the location of Middlesex County Courthouse
- Location: Off VA 602, Urbanna, Virginia
- Coordinates: 37°38′9″N 76°34′34″W
- Area: less than one acre
- Built: 1745
- Architectural style: Colonial
- NRHP reference No.: 76002114
- VLR No.: 316-0002

Significant dates
- Added to NRHP: November 21, 1976
- Designated VLR: June 15, 1976

The Middlesex County Courthouse in Urbanna, Virginia was built starting in 1745. It was listed on the National Register of Historic Places (NRHP) in 1976. It has also been known as Old Middlesex County Courthouse and as Middlesex County Woman's Club.

During the American Civil War, the building was used by Confederate troops and was shelled by Union gunboats, but was not much damaged. It has been used as a church. In 1948 it was deconsecrated and ownership was transferred to the Middlesex County Woman's Club. As of 1976 the building was used by that group as its headquarters and for community and private functions. It is located in the Urbanna Historic District.

== See also ==
- Middlesex County Courthouse (Saluda, Virginia), a successor courthouse built in 1858, also NRHP-listed
