= Margots =

Historic house in Virginia, United States

- U.S. National Register of Historic Places
- Virginia Landmarks Register
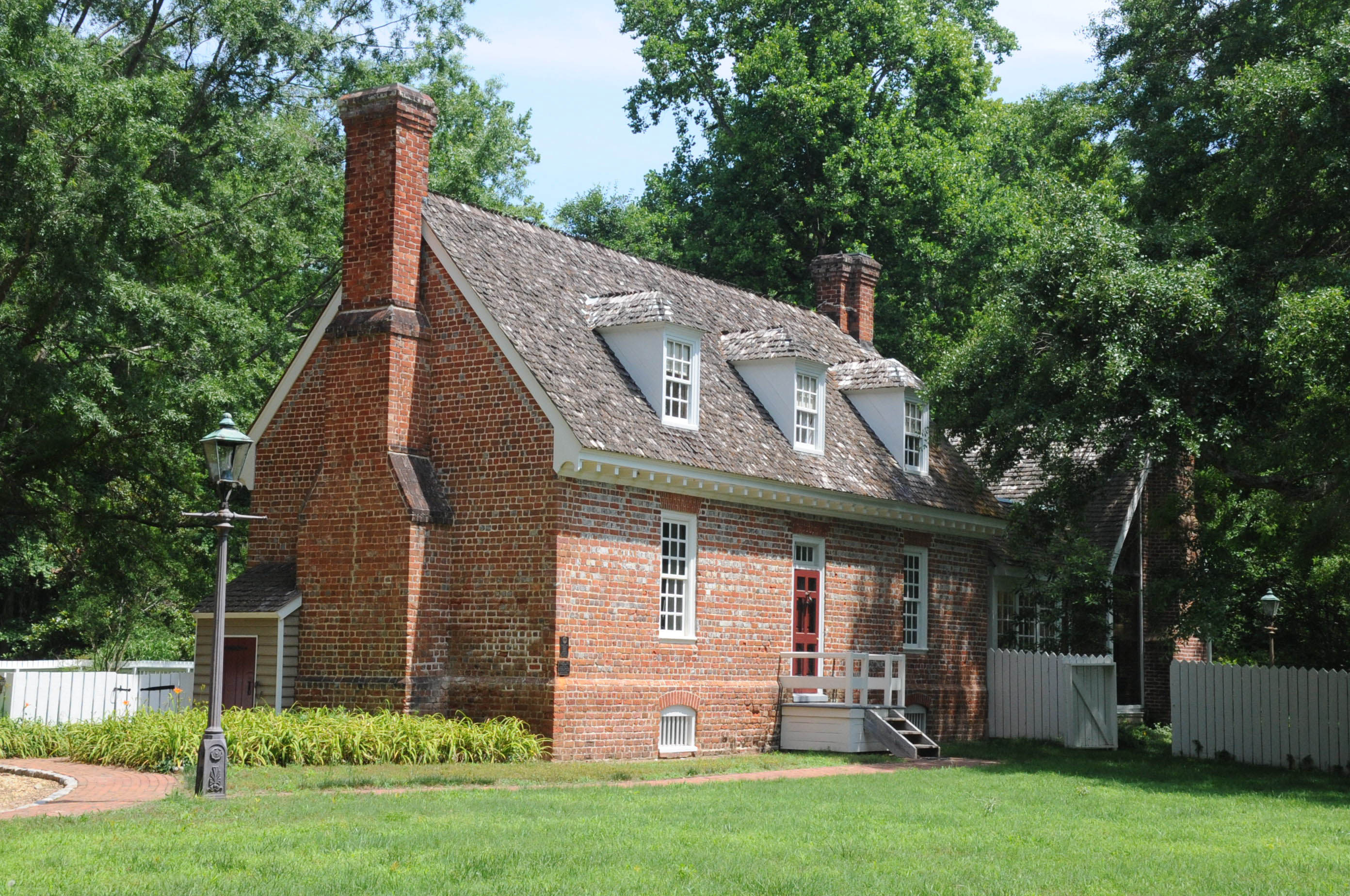

- Location within Virginia Location within the United States
- Location: NE of Tettington off VA 621, near Tettington, Virginia
- Coordinates: 37°18′35″N 76°53′19″W
- Area: 135 acres (55 ha)
- Built: c. 1700
- NRHP reference No.: 73002203
- VLR No.: 018-0037

Significant dates
- Added to NRHP: August 17, 1973
- Designated VLR: July 17, 1973

Margots, also known as Eagle's Nest, Eagles Lodge, and Claybancke, is a historic home located near Tettington, Charles City County, Virginia. It was originally built about 1700, as a 1 1/2-story, three-bay brick structure above a basement, until raised by addition of a frame second story in the 19th century. The house measures 44 feet, 4 inches, by 20 feet, 8 inches. It is one of a few surviving circa 1700 medium-sized houses of Tidewater Virginia. In 1973, the property was sold to the Virginia Commission of Game and Inland Fisheries by the Beale Estate.

It was added to the National Register of Historic Places in 1973.
