= Wales (Dinwiddie County, Virginia) =

Historic house in Virginia, United States

- U.S. National Register of Historic Places
- Virginia Landmarks Register
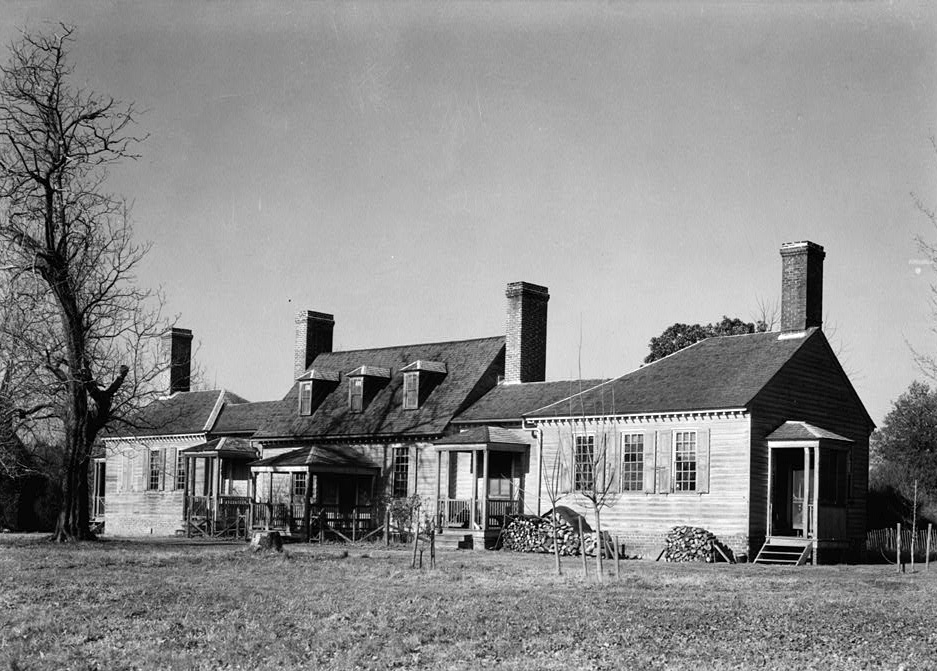
- Historic image of Wales

- Location within Virginia Location within the United States
- Location: W of Petersburg off VA 632, near Petersburg, Virginia
- Coordinates: 37°11′27″N 77°30′31″W
- Area: 94 acres (38 ha)
- Built: 1730
- NRHP reference No.: 74002115
- VLR No.: 026-0024

Significant dates
- Added to NRHP: December 23, 1974
- Designated VLR: November 19, 1974

Wales is a historic house and site in Dinwiddie County, Virginia. It was built in 1730 by Captain Howell Briggs of the Virginia Militia on a tract of land a few miles west of Petersburg, Virginia, in what was then Prince George County. Dinwiddie County was formed from Prince George in 1752. Briggs is said to have named his plantation "Wales" after the Prince of Wales.

Wales was listed on the National Register of Historic Places in 1974.

The area listed was 94 acres (38 ha) and includes four contributing buildings and two contributing structures.

The main house is a five-part Palladian architecture composition and is a Virginia Historic Landmark.
