= Lansdowne (Urbanna, Virginia) =

Historic house in Virginia, United States

- U.S. National Register of Historic Places
- U.S. Historic district – Contributing property
- Virginia Landmarks Register
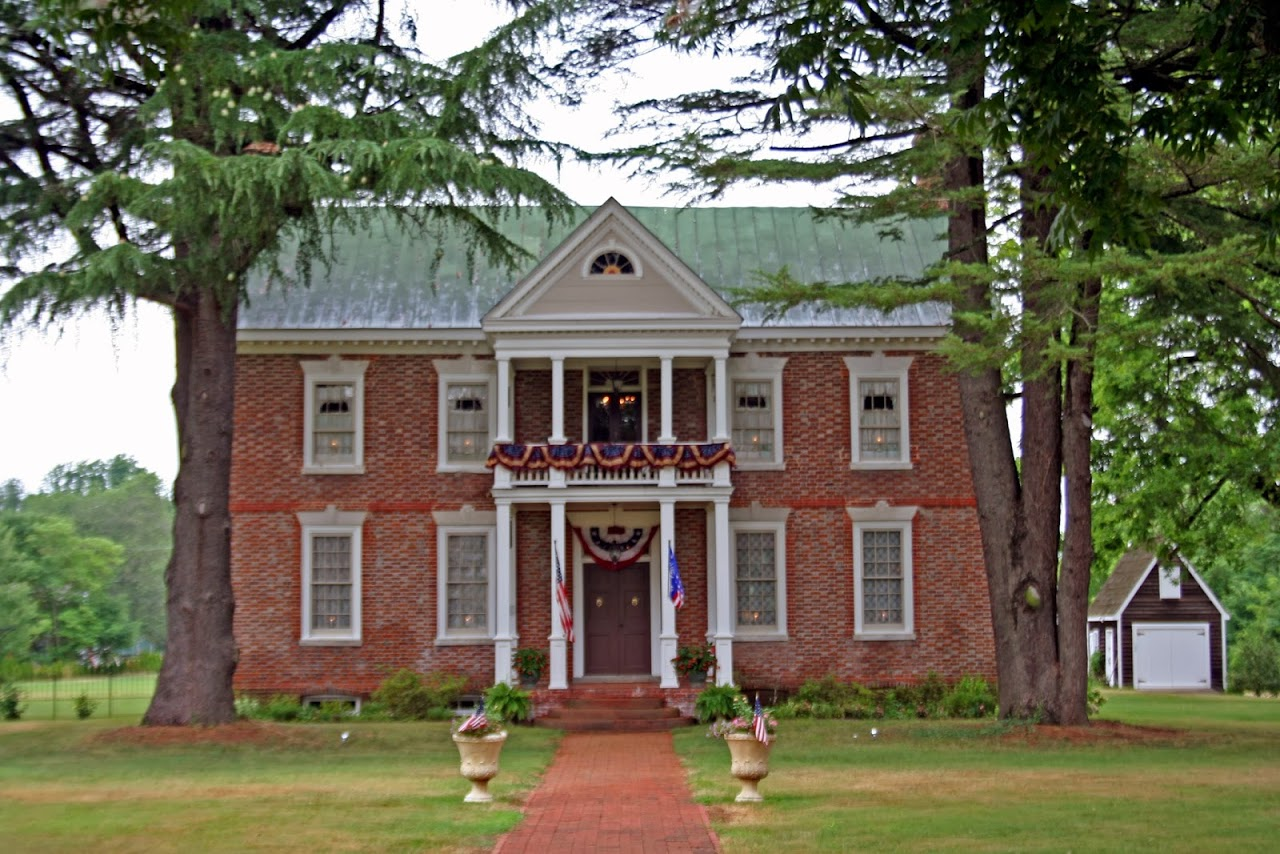

- Location within Virginia Location within the United States
- Location: Virginia St. at Upton Lane, Urbanna, Virginia
- Coordinates: 37°38′12″N 76°34′37″W
- Area: 0.5 acres (0.20 ha)
- Built: 1740
- Architectural style: Georgian, Early Georgian
- NRHP reference No.: 74002138
- VLR No.: 316-0003

Significant dates
- Added to NRHP: November 8, 1974
- Designated VLR: September 17, 1974

Lansdowne is a historic home located at Urbanna, Middlesex County, Virginia. It was constructed about 1740, and is a two-story, five-bay, T-shaped, brick dwelling in the Early Georgian style. It consists of a main section measuring 52 feet by 25 feet, with a rear wing of 36 feet by 18 feet. The front facade features a tall pedimented portico projecting from the center bay. It was the home of diplomat Arthur Lee (1791-1792), who is buried on the property in the family cemetery. Lee helped to negotiate and signed the 1778 Treaty of Alliance, which allied France and the United States together during the American Revolutionary War.

It was listed on the National Register of Historic Places in 1974. It is located in the Urbanna Historic District.
