= James Mills Storehouse =

Historic commercial building in Virginia, US

- U.S. National Register of Historic Places
- U.S. Historic district – Contributing property
- Virginia Landmarks Register
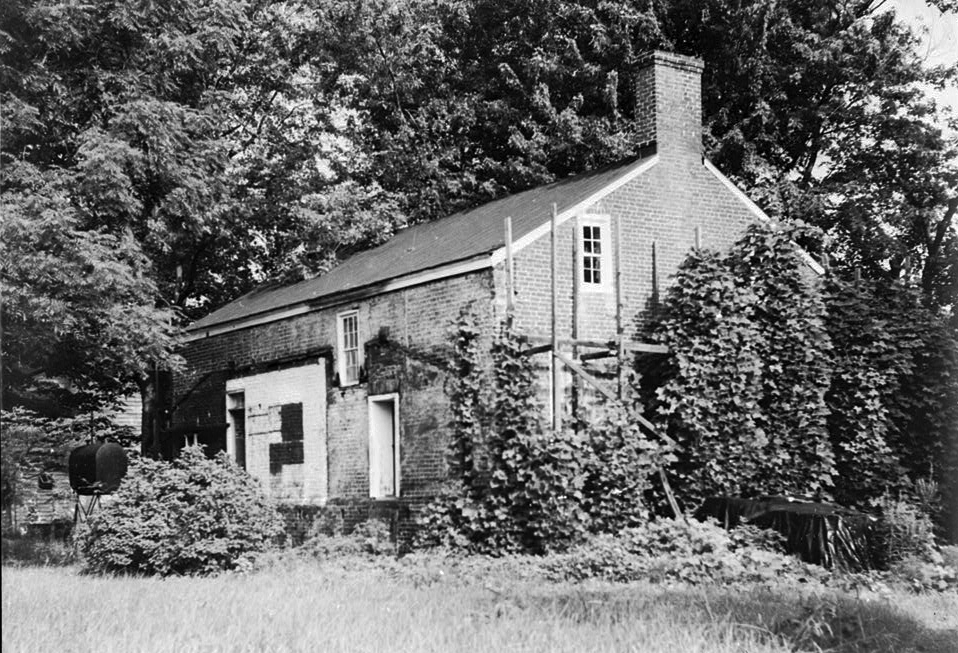
- HABS photo

- Location within Virginia Location within the United States
- Location: S side of Rte. T-1002, Urbanna, Virginia
- Coordinates: 37°38′11″N 76°34′23″W
- Area: 1 acre (0.40 ha)
- Built: 1763-1767
- NRHP reference No.: 72001409
- VLR No.: 316-0004

Significant dates
- Added to NRHP: November 7, 1972
- Designated VLR: April 18, 1972

James Mills Storehouse, also known as the Old Tobacco Warehouse, is a historic store located at Urbanna, Middlesex County, Virginia. It was built between 1763 and 1767, and is a 1 1/2-story, rectangular brick structure on a raised brick basement. It has a gable roof and full-width front porch. It is a rare if not unique survivor of the type of storehouse which, being run by a resident factor of a British company, was not only connected with the sale of tobacco but which housed imported goods to be bought on credit by the planters.

It was listed on the National Register of Historic Places in 1972.
