= Saluda, Virginia =

Census-designated place in Virginia, US

Coordinates: 37°36′22″N 76°35′42″W

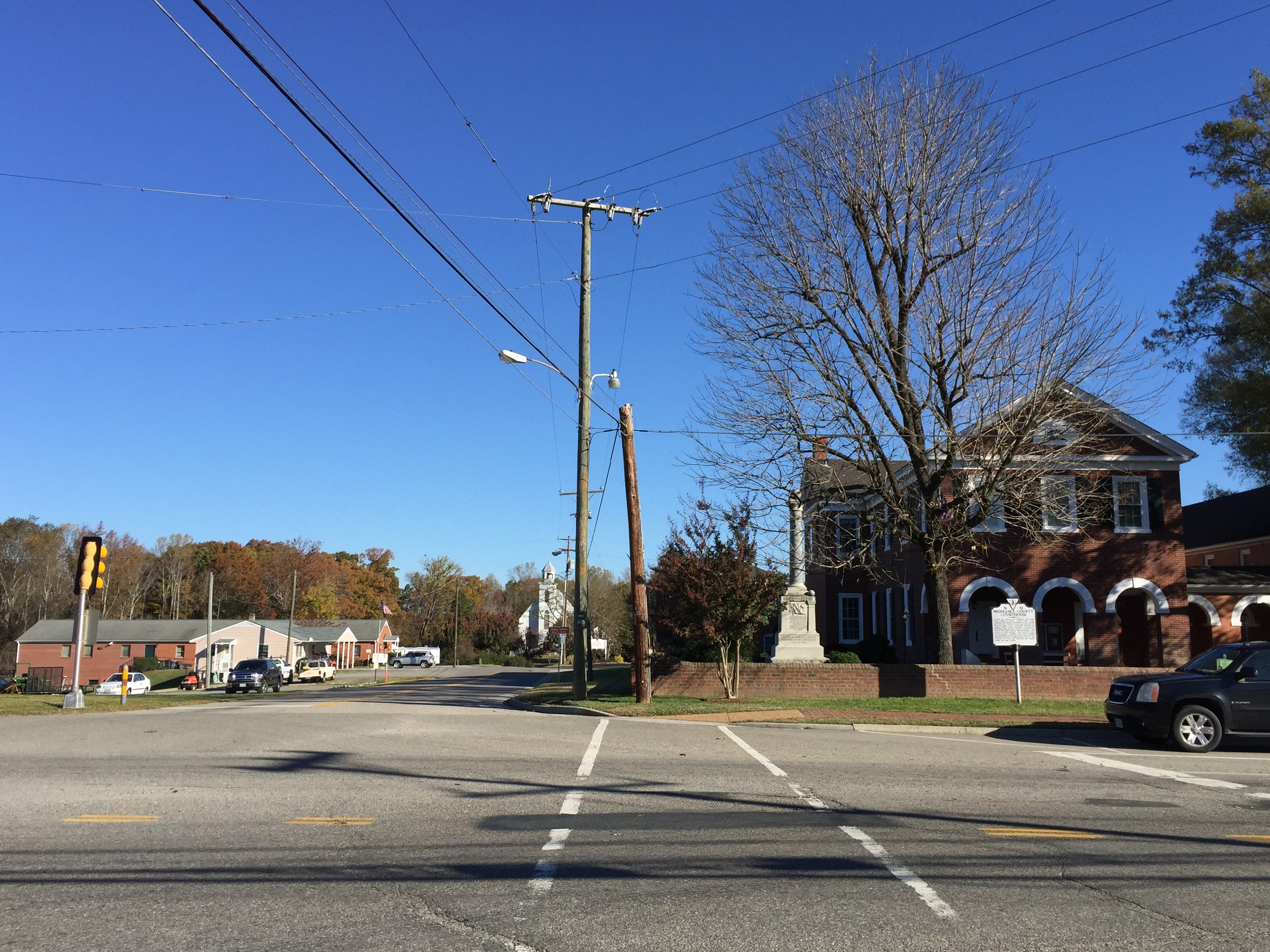
Downtown Saluda, with the courthouse on the right

Saluda is a census-designated place (CDP) in and the county seat of Middlesex County, Virginia, United States. As of the 2020 census, Saluda had a population of 627.

== History ==
The Middlesex County Courthouse was built between 1850 and 1874 by architects William R. Jones and John P. Hill, and is listed in the National Register of Historic Places. A new courthouse complex was built in the 2003–2004 time-frame, but the opening was stalled due to various construction problems, leading to a legal dispute between the County board and the contractor. It was eventually opened in 2007.

An older notable building is the Christ Church. The highly decorated Marine, veteran of the Banana Wars, World War II, and the Korean War, Lieutenant General Lewis Burwell "Chesty" Puller was raised in Saluda. He died in Hampton, Virginia in 1971, and was buried in historic Christ Church's Cemetery near Saluda.

== Demographics ==
Historical population
Census	Pop.	Note	%±
2010	769		—
2020	627		−18.5%
U.S. Decennial Census; 2010 2020

Saluda was first listed as a census designated place in the 2010 U.S. census.

The population stated in the 2010 Census was 769. As of the 2020 Census, the population was 627. According to the 2020 Census, Saluda has a 55.6% employment rate, 228 total houses with 125 belonging to families, and a medium income of $115,221 with a 10.7% poverty rate. Out of the population, 451 are white, 134 are black, 28 are mixed race, 1 is Asian, 1 is Native American, and 12 are other.
