= Urbanna, Virginia =

- Town
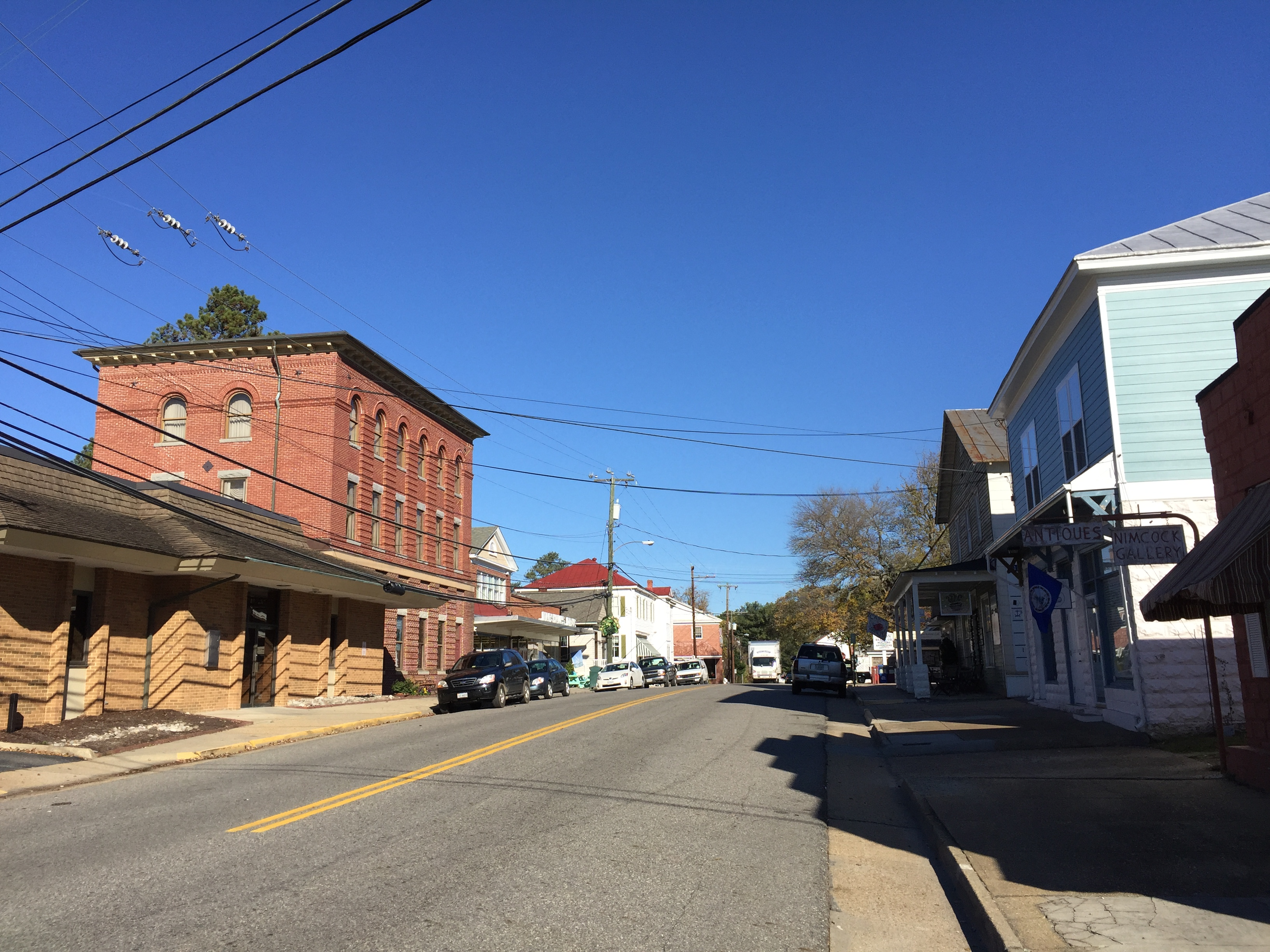
- Urbanna Historic District

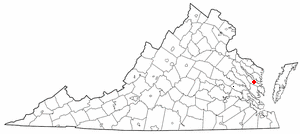
- Location of Urbanna, Virginia
- Coordinates: 37°38′16″N 76°34′23″W
- Country: United States
- State: Virginia
- County: Middlesex

Area
  - Total: 0.51 sq mi (1.32 km^{2})
  - Land: 0.42 sq mi (1.10 km^{2})
  - Water: 0.085 sq mi (0.22 km^{2})
- Elevation: 20 ft (6 m)

Population (2020)
  - Total: 492
  - Estimate (2019): 458
  - Density: 1,082.2/sq mi (417.85/km^{2})
- Time zone: UTC−5 (Eastern (EST))
  - Summer (DST): UTC−4 (EDT)
- ZIP code: 23175
- Area code: 804
- FIPS code: 51-80272
- GNIS feature ID: 1500249
- Website: www.urbannava.gov

Urbanna is a town in Middlesex County, Virginia, United States. Urbanna means “City of Anne” and was named in honor of England's Queen Anne. As of the 2020 census, Urbanna had a population of 492.

== History ==
Before 1680, planters such as Ralph Wormeley shipped tobacco directly from private landings on their own riverfront plantations rather than through an official port of entry. The 1680 Acts of Assembly passed at Jamestown ordered the creation of twenty 50-acre port towns through which the colony's trade was to pass; in Middlesex County the site chosen was part of Wormeley's Rosegill plantation, which in 1705 was named the "Burgh of Urbanna". Urbanna served as a tobacco port in the 18th century and later became a mercantile and commercial fishing center; the Urbanna Historic District was listed on the National Register of Historic Places in 1991.

Lansdowne, a Georgian mansion in the town, was the home of Arthur Lee, who with Benjamin Franklin and Silas Deane represented the Continental Congress at the French court at Versailles.

== Geography ==
Urbanna is located at 37°38′16″N 76°34′23″W (37.637796, −76.573149).

According to the United States Census Bureau, the town has a total area of 0.5 square mile (1.3 km^{2}), of which 0.4 square mile (1.1 km^{2}) is land and 0.1 square mile (0.2 km^{2}) (17.65%) is water.

== Demographics ==
Historical population
Census	Pop.	Note	%±
1880	163		—
1910	475		—
1920	387		−18.5%
1930	432		11.6%
1940	482		11.6%
1950	505		4.8%
1960	512		1.4%
1970	475		−7.2%
1980	518		9.1%
1990	529		2.1%
2000	543		2.6%
2010	476		−12.3%
2020	492		3.4%
U.S. Decennial Census

As of the census of 2000, there were 543 people, 266 households, and 160 families residing in the town. The population density was 1,286.5 people per square mile (499.2/km^{2}). There were 354 housing units at an average density of 838.7 per square mile (325.4/km^{2}). The racial makeup of the town was 95.58% White (U.S. Census), 3.50% Black, and 0.92% from two or more races. Hispanic or Latino people of any race were 0.55% of the population.

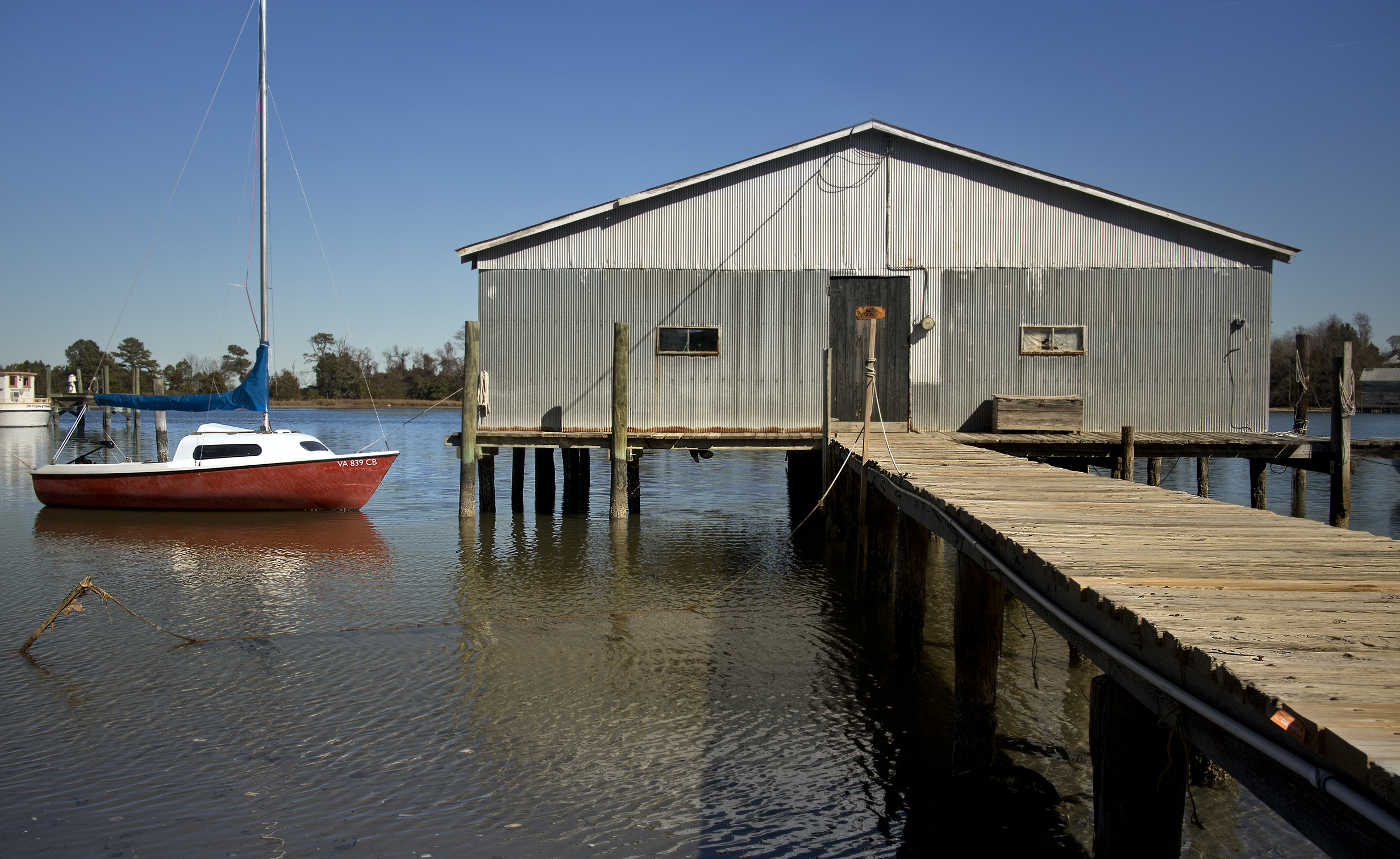
A view of Urbanna Creek

There were 266 households, out of which 20.7% had children under the age of 18 living with them, 46.6% were married couples living together, 11.7% had a female householder with no husband present, and 39.5% were non-families. 35.0% of all households were made up of individuals, and 19.5% had someone living alone who was 65 years of age or older. The average household size was 2.04 and the average family size was 2.61.

In the town, the population was spread out, with 18.6% under the age of 18, 3.7% from 18 to 24, 21.4% from 25 to 44, 30.9% from 45 to 64, and 25.4% who were 65 years of age or older. The median age was 49 years. For every 100 females, there were 70.2 males. For every 100 females aged 18 and over, there were 73.3 males.

The median income for a household in the town was $42,054, and the median income for a family was $49,583. Males had a median income of $33,214 versus $28,375 for females. The per capita income for the town was $32,944. About 4.6% of families and 4.7% of the population were below the poverty line, including 6.3% of those under age 18 and 2.3% of those age 65 or over.

== Events ==
For more than 60 years, the town has hosted the Urbanna Oyster Festival. Begun in 1958, the festival is held the first weekend of November each year, from Friday morning to ending Saturday night. Live music, arts and crafts, two parades (the Fireman Parade on Friday night, and the Festival Parade on Saturday afternoon), the renowned oyster-shucking contest, and children's activities are all major attractions. A variety of foods is available from numerous vendors. Annual attendance over the two days is in between 50,000 and 75,000. During the festival, the town is closed to traffic in the afternoon on Friday and for most of the day Saturday. Admission to the event is free of charge, although there is a fee for parking within the vicinity of the festival.

An outdoor art and craft show, Art on the Half Shell, was started in 2001. The juried, one-day event has become quite popular and, like the Oyster Festival, is open to the public at no charge. Local and out of town artists are featured, with a great variety of artistic mediums presented.

August in Urbanna includes Founders' Day, the 2018 event coincides with oyster buyboats on display at the marina.

The Museum in Urbanna, once a Scottish Factor Store, displays a copy of John Mitchell's Map.

== Notable people ==
- William Overton Callis, soldier and friend of James Madison
- Arthur Lee, diplomat
- Celia Rowlson-Hall, dancer
- William G. Allen, abolitionist

== Climate ==
The climate in this area is characterized by hot, humid summers and generally mild to cool winters. According to the Köppen Climate Classification system, Urbanna has a humid subtropical climate, abbreviated "Cfa" on climate maps.
