= National Register of Historic Places listings in James City County, Virginia =

Location of James City County in Virginia

This is a list of the National Register of Historic Places listings in James City County, Virginia.

This is intended to be a complete list of the properties and districts on the National Register of Historic Places in James City County, Virginia, United States. The locations of National Register properties and districts for which the latitude and longitude coordinates are included below, may be seen in an online map.

There are 19 properties and districts listed on the National Register in the county, including one National Historic Landmark.

This National Park Service list is complete through NPS recent listings posted May 1, 2026.

== Current listings ==
	Name on the Register	Image	Date listed	Location	City or town	Description
1	Amblers	Amblers	February 17, 2015 (#15000016)	2205 State Route 31; 37°13′36″N 76°47′14″W	Jamestown	
2	Archeological Site No. 44JC308		June 26, 1993 (#93000507)	18th hole at the Two Rivers Country Club; 37°14′55″N 76°52′18″W	Williamsburg	Paspahegh settlement site
3	Carter's Grove	Carter's Grove	November 12, 1969 (#69000249)	Southwest of U.S. Route 60; 37°12′25″N 76°37′29″W	Williamsburg	Georgian country house and plantation near Williamsburg, recently closed and sold to a private owner
4	Chickahominy Shipyard Archeological Site		June 28, 1979 (#79003048)	Address Restricted	Toano	
5	Colonial National Historical Park	Colonial National Historical Park	October 15, 1966 (#66000839)	Colonial Parkway; 37°13′15″N 76°46′16″W	Jamestown	
6	Croaker Landing Archaeological Site (44JC70)	Croaker Landing Archaeological Site (44JC70)	May 14, 1987 (#87000753)	Address Restricted	Croaker	
7	Governor's Land Archeological District	Governor's Land Archeological District	September 21, 1973 (#73002025)	Roughly bounded by Powhatan Creek, State Route 5, Greensprings Rd., the First Colony community, and the James River; 37°14′06″N 76°46′57″W	Jamestown	
8	Green Spring	Green Spring	December 29, 1978 (#78000261)	Centerville Rd. 37°15′30″N 76°48′12″W	Williamsburg	
9	Hickory Neck Church	Hickory Neck Church	July 2, 1973 (#73002023)	North of Toano on U.S. Route 60; 37°23′35″N 76°48′11″W	Toano	
10	Jamestown National Historic Site	Jamestown National Historic Site	October 15, 1966 (#66000840)	Jamestown Island; 37°12′31″N 76°46′42″W	Jamestown	
11	Kingsmill Plantation	Kingsmill Plantation	April 26, 1972 (#72001401)	Kingsmill Resort, 5 miles (8.0 km) south of Williamsburg; 37°13′43″N 76°40′35″W	Williamsburg	
12	Norge Train Depot	Norge Train Depot	May 5, 2009 (#08000256)	7770 Croaker Rd. 37°22′36″N 76°46′17″W	Williamsburg	
13	Pinewoods	Pinewoods	November 12, 1971 (#71000983)	1.4 miles (2.3 km) southwest of the junction of Centerville and Brick Bat Rds. 37°16′21″N 76°49′32″W	Lightfoot	
14	Powhatan	Powhatan	September 15, 1970 (#70000803)	Ironbound Rd., north of its junction with State Route 5; 37°15′47″N 76°46′09″W	Five Forks	
15	Riverview	Riverview	December 6, 1996 (#96001446)	124 Riverview Plantation Dr. 37°23′08″N 76°41′12″W	Williamsburg	
16	Stone House Site		August 14, 1973 (#73002024)	Address Restricted	Toano	
17	Toano Historic District	Toano Historic District	April 3, 2019 (#100003605)	7852-7960 Richmond Rd. 37°22′47″N 76°48′13″W	Toano	
18	White Hall	White Hall	March 30, 2007 (#07000234)	3200 Rochambeau Rd. 37°24′07″N 76°48′17″W	Toano	
19	Windsor Castle	Windsor Castle	December 14, 1987 (#87002149)	1812 Forge Rd. 37°22′33″N 76°51′15″W	Toano	

== See also ==
- List of National Historic Landmarks in Virginia
- National Register of Historic Places listings in Virginia
- National Register of Historic Places listings in Williamsburg, Virginia
