= Moysonec =

Archaeological site in Virginia, United States

- U.S. National Register of Historic Places
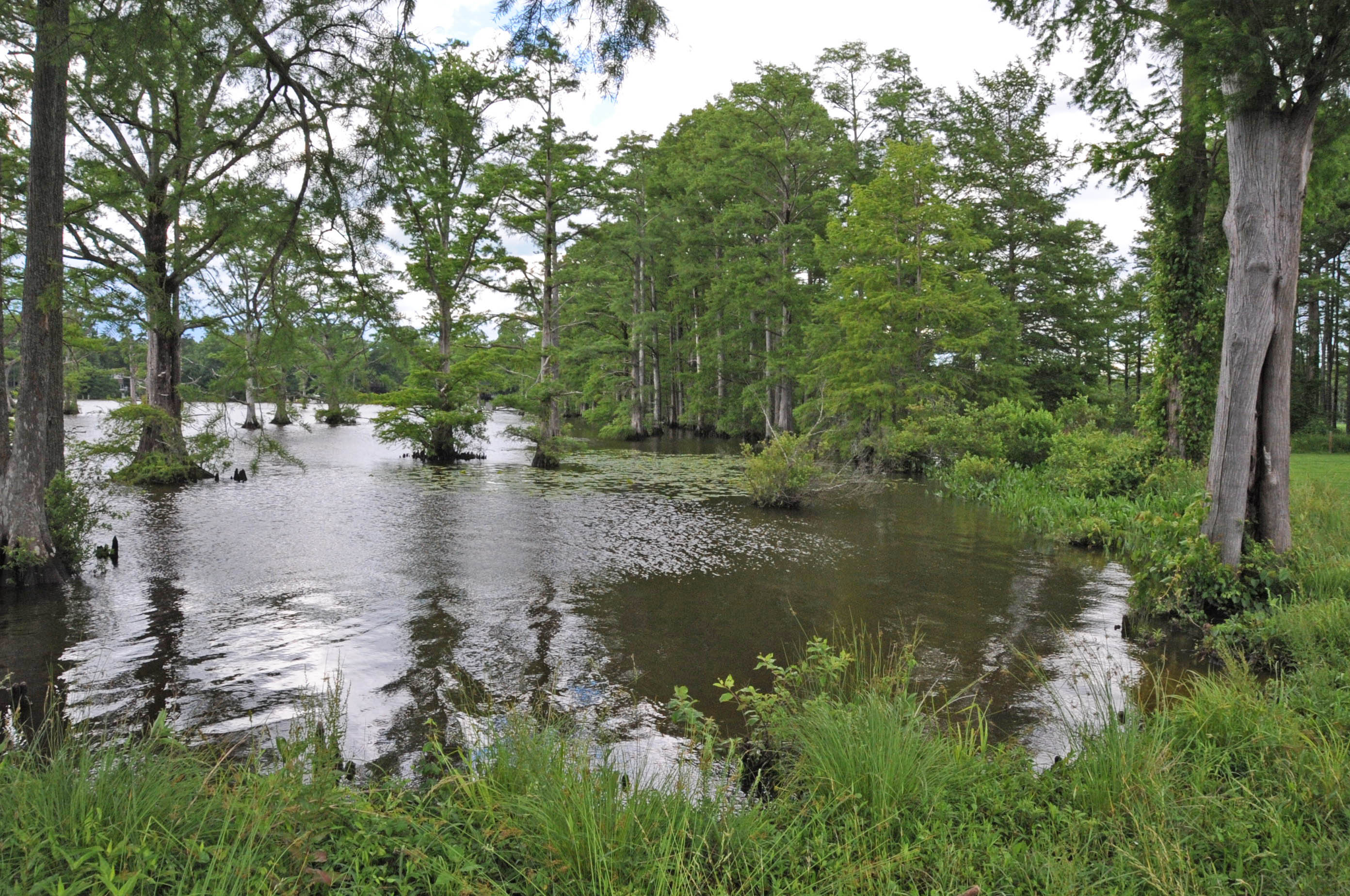
- Mouth of Diacund Creek
- Nearest city: Lanexa, Virginia
- Area: 190 acres (77 ha)
- NRHP reference No.: 75002026
- Added to NRHP: June 20, 1975

Moysonec was a Native American (Powhatan) village on the Chickahominy River in what is now New Kent County, Virginia. The site of the village was listed on the National Register of Historic Places in 1975. Its exact location is not disclosed but described as being in the vicinity of Hicks Island (about three miles up Diascund Creek). A few years later researchers identified the location of the village as being up the river (west) of where Diascund Creek, enters the river. It is notable as the presumed home of natives who captured explorer John Smith in 1607.

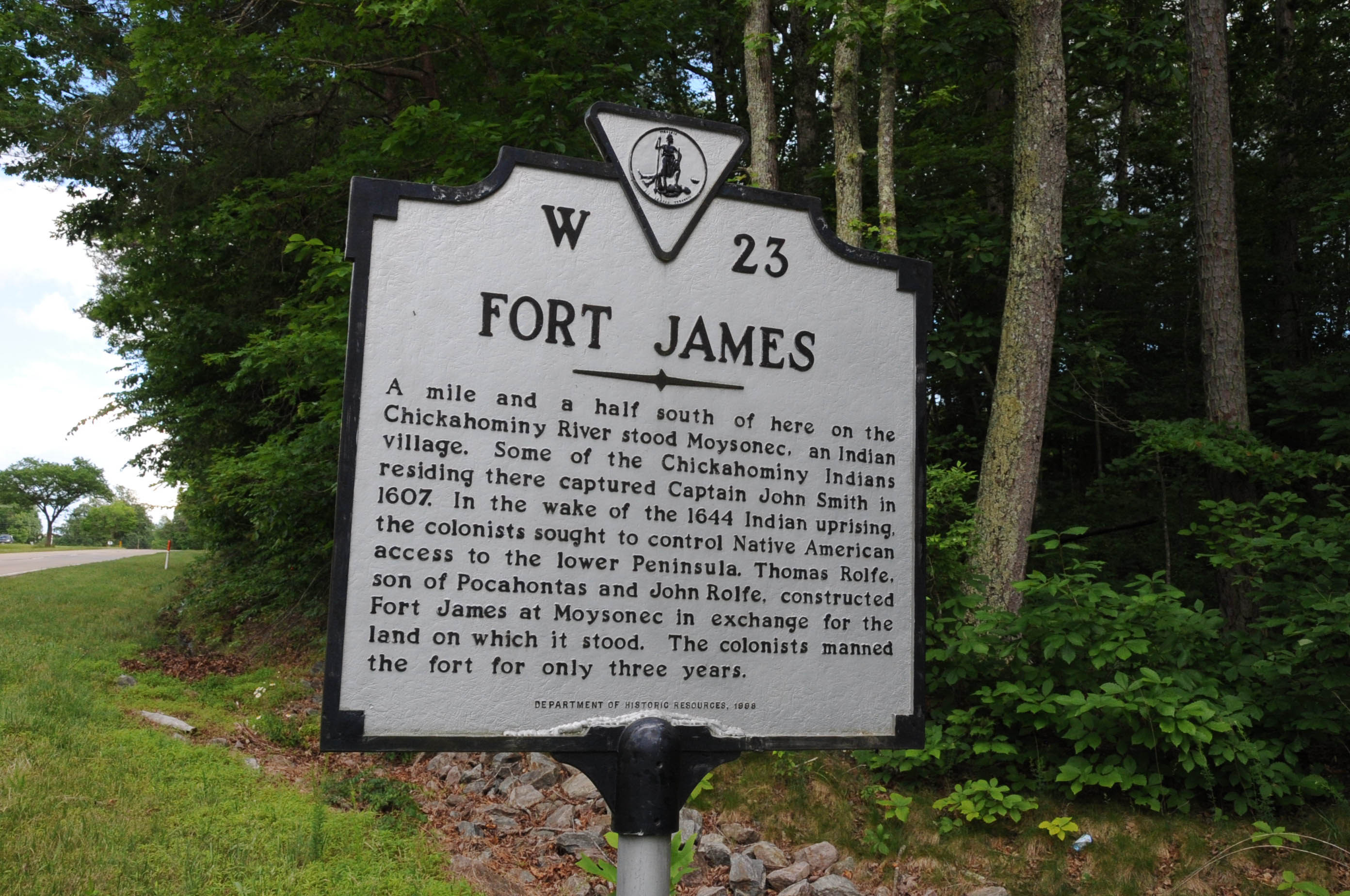
Historical marker of the history of Moysonec and Fort James

== See also ==
- National Register of Historic Places listings in New Kent County, Virginia
