= Ewell, Virginia =

Unincorporated community in Virginia, United States

Coordinates: 37°19′45″N 76°44′32″W

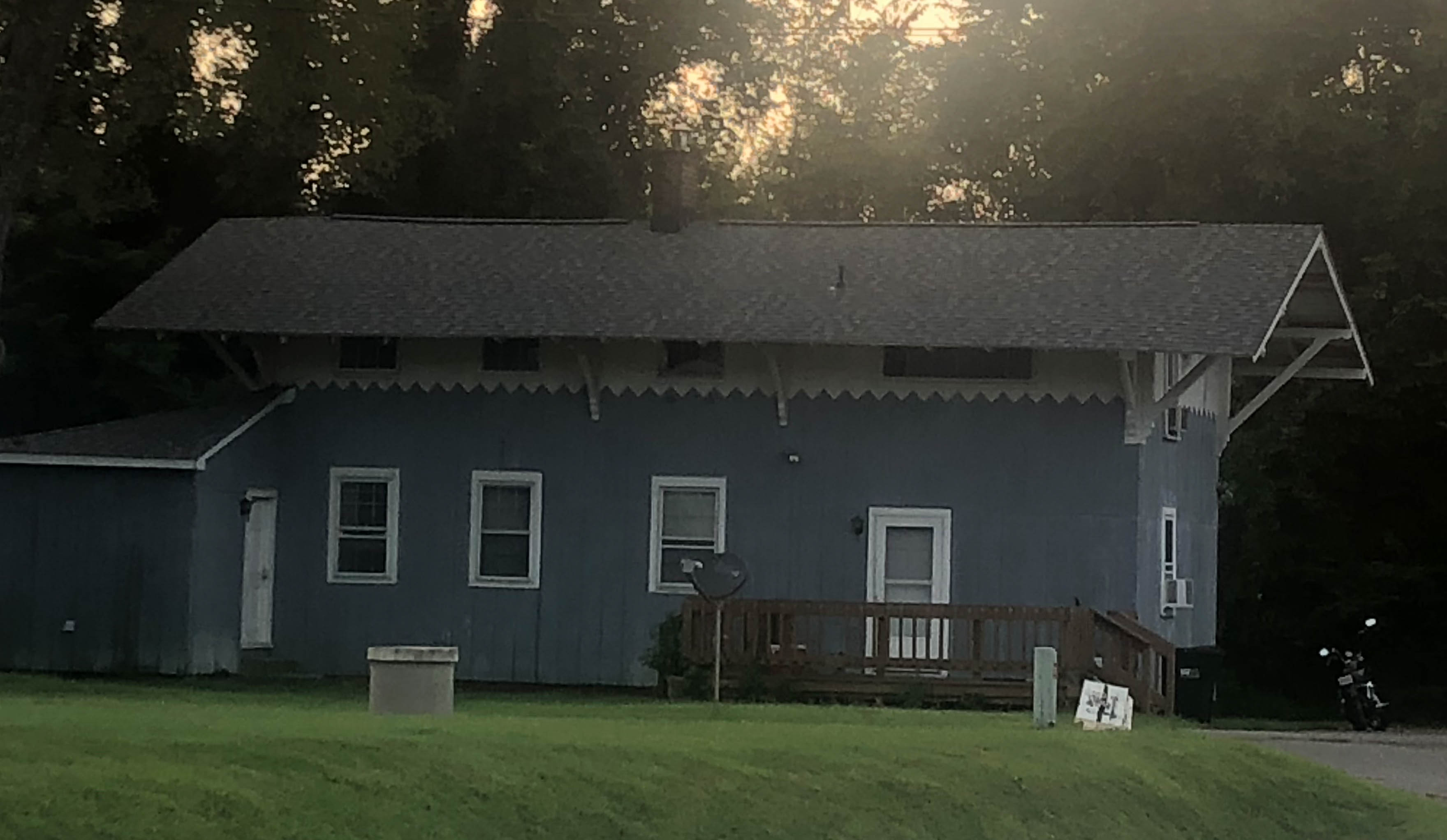
Former Ewell depot in 2021.

Ewell was an unincorporated town in James City County west of Williamsburg, in the U.S. state of Virginia.

Ewell was named for Benjamin Stoddert Ewell, who was a U.S. and Confederate army officer, and civil engineer. A local farmer, he is best remembered for his presidency of the College of William and Mary in nearby Williamsburg during turbulent times for the school before and after the American Civil War. Ewell's tireless efforts to restore the historic school and its programs during and after Reconstruction became legendary in Williamsburg and at the College and were ultimately successful, with funding from both the U.S. Congress and the Commonwealth of Virginia. Benjamin Ewell remained in Williamsburg as President Emeritus of the College until his death in 1894.

In 1881, the Chesapeake and Ohio Railway (C&O) was extended east from Richmond to a new coal pier at Newport News on the harbor of Hampton Roads. The railroad's new Peninsula Subdivision opened new shipping opportunities for the farmers of the region. In James City County, new railroad stations were established every few miles, at Diascund, Toano, Vaiden's Siding (Norge), Kelton (Lightfoot) and Ewell, Williamsburg, and Grove.

In the mid 20th century, the smaller stations along the line were discontinued as trucking assumed most of the shipping business, although Williamsburg remained open for passenger services. The wooden station from Ewell was relocated a short distance away and was in alternate use as of June 2013. The larger station building from Norge has also been preserved, and was relocated to a site adjacent to the Williamsburg Regional Library branch on Croaker Road.

Along U.S. Route 60, a portion of the old Richmond-Williamsburg Stage Road, Ewell Hall, the historic plantation house built by Benjamin Ewell eventually became the restored centerpiece of a cemetery, Williamsburg Memorial Park.

As the Williamsburg community expanded even beyond the city limits, Ewell lost its individual identity and became part of an area popular with tourists for outlet shopping, hotels, restaurants and attractions. Ewell is no longer a mailing address, and is now considered one of the former counties, cities, and towns of Virginia.
