= Lanexa, Virginia =

Unincorporated community in Virginia, United States

Coordinates: 37°25′26″N 76°54′04″W

Lanexa is an unincorporated community located partially in New Kent County and partially in James City County, Virginia, United States. The ZIP Code for Lanexa is 23089. Lanexa is located by the Chickahominy River and has many tourism sites for camping and outdoor activities, including Chickahominy Shores. Diascund Creek runs immediately to the east of the center of Lanexa. A dam creates the Diascund Creek Reservoir, operated by Newport News Waterworks, on the north side of the community.

The first use of "Lanexa" to designate a place in the area came 1882 when it was given to a station on the Peninsula Extension of the Chesapeake and Ohio Railway near where the tracks run along the Chickahominy River, west of Diascund Creek. The station was east of Walkers and west of Diascund. The Lanexa post office remained at this site for many years. Today, the post office is on the present main artery, Pocahontas Trail (US Route 60) and through postal usage, Lanexa designates a larger area, stretching north to the Pamunkey River.

== Earlier History ==
The Powhatan village of Moysonec was located in what is now known as Lanexa, on the peninsula between the Chickahominy River and Diascund Creek. The site is on the National Register of Historic Places. In 1644 Thomas Rolfe, the son of John Rolfe and Pocahontas, constructed Fort James on the bluffs overlooking the Chickahominy River on the northern end of the peninsula, east of the future Lanexa train station and post office .

The location where US 60 now crosses Diascund Creek, on the Stewart U. Taylor Memorial Bridge, has been the site of a bridge since colonial times. Diascund Bridge figured in both the Revolutionary and Civil wars and often appeared on maps. Coopers Mill was located a half mile north. Liberty Baptist Church has been located adjacent to the bridge location since 1852.
