= Diascund, Virginia =

Unincorporated community in Virginia, United States

Coordinates: 37°023′39.52″N 76°52′13.84″W

Diascund was a railway stop, unincorporated community, and post office in Virginia located at milepost 47 on the Peninsula Extension of the Chesapeake and Ohio Railway in James City County. When this rail line was built in 1881, stations were established every few miles. To the west was the Lanexa station, and four miles to the east, Toano. The depot was east of the railroad’s crossing of Diascund Creek near the current Diascund Road. Along with other depots along the route, such as the surviving Lee Hall Depot, the Diascund depot was constructed in 1881 or shortly thereafter. By 1916, its board-and-baton siding it was painted in the "Colonial Buff" color scheme. The one-story depot was still standing in 1969. By 2008, it had been destroyed.
