= Chickahominy Shores, Virginia =

Unincorporated community in Virginia, US

Coordinates: 37°23′38″N 76°56′28″W

Chickahominy Shores is an unincorporated community on the Chickahominy River in New Kent County, Virginia, United States. It is within the broader community of Lanexa.
