= Amblers =

Historic house in Virginia, United States

- U.S. National Register of Historic Places
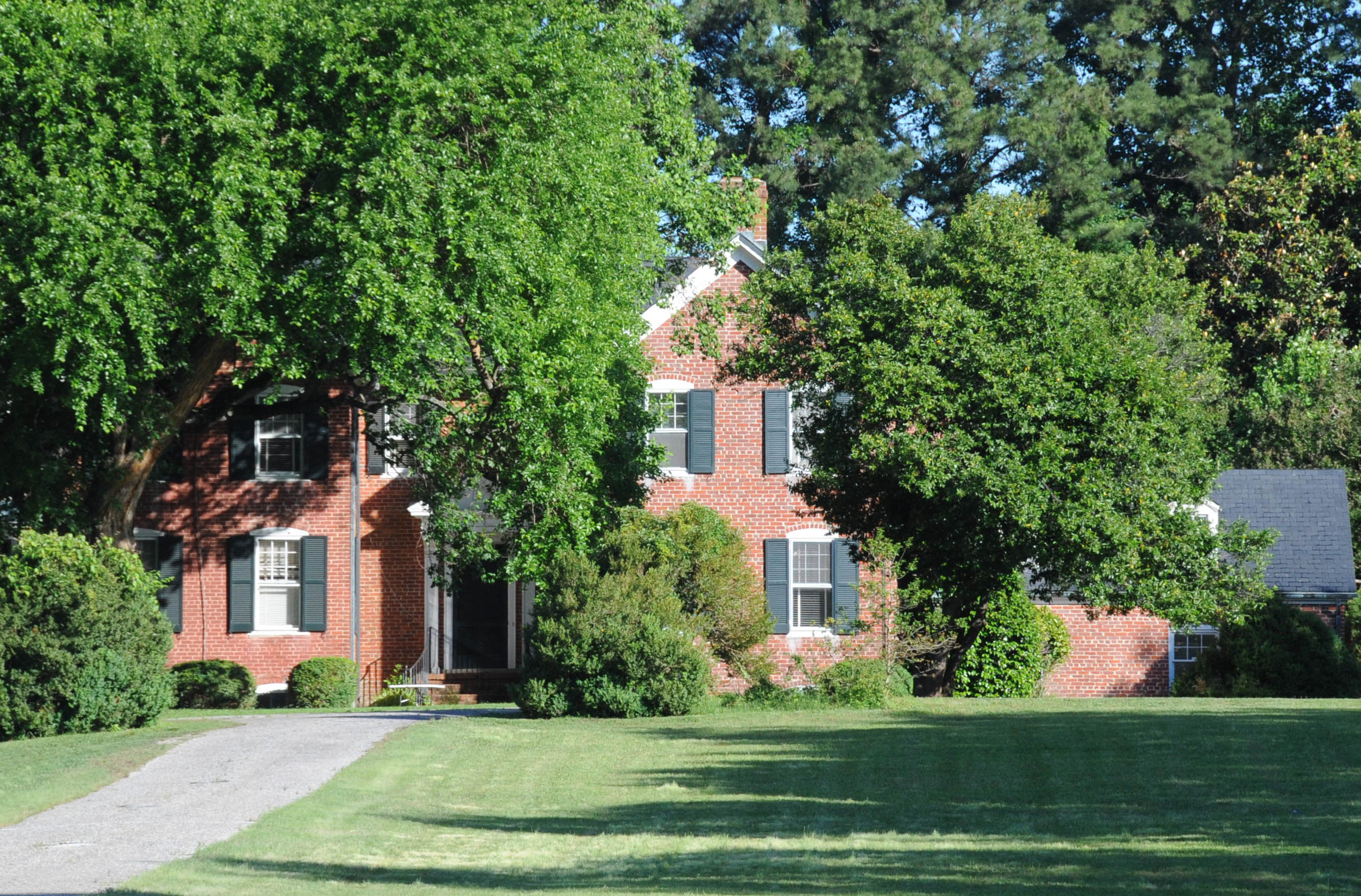
- in May, 2017

- Location within Virginia Location within the United States
- Location: 2205 Jamestown Rd., near Jamestown, Virginia
- Coordinates: 37°13′33″N 76°47′8″W
- Area: 8.8 acres (3.6 ha)
- Built: 1852
- NRHP reference No.: 15000016
- Added to NRHP: February 17, 2015

Amblers, also known as the Coke-Watts House, is a historic farmstead at 2205 Jamestown Road in James City County, Virginia, just north of the Jamestown peninsula. Its main house is a handsome 2 1/2-story brick structure, built in 1852 in the country style promoted by Andrew Jackson Downing, and expanded with a sympathetically styled Colonial Revival addition in the 1950s. The property includes two surviving 19th-century brick farm outbuildings, and landscaping from the 1950s that is also considered historically significant.

The property was listed on the National Register of Historic Places in 2015.

== See also ==
- National Register of Historic Places listings in James City County, Virginia
