= Peninsula Extension =

1881 railroad line from Richmond, VA to Newport News, VA

- The Peninsula Extension of the Chesapeake and Ohio Railway led to Hampton Roads at Newport News, Virginia where West Virginia coal was loaded aboard colliers and shipped worldwide.

Overview
- Other name: Peninsula Subdivision
- Owner: CSX Transportation
- Termini: Richmond, Virginia; Newport News, Virginia

History
- Completed: 16 October 1881

Technical
- Line length: 82.3 mi (132.4 km)
- Number of tracks: 2
- Track gauge: 4 ft 8 1/2 in (1,435 mm)

The Peninsula Extension which created the Peninsula Subdivision of the Chesapeake and Ohio Railway (C&O) was the new railroad line on the Virginia Peninsula from Richmond to southeastern Warwick County. Its principal purpose was to provide an important new pathway for coal mined in West Virginia to reach the harbor of Hampton Roads for coastal and export shipping on collier ships.

Completed on 16 October 1881, the new double-tracked railroad and the other development visions of industrialist Collis Potter Huntington resulted in a 15-year transition of the rural farm village of Newport News into a new independent city which also became home to the world's largest shipyard. The railroad, one of the later developed in Virginia, became important to many communities, opening transportation options, and stimulating commerce and military operations on the Peninsula throughout the 20th century.

Over 125 years after it opened, many of the stations are gone. Spur lines have both come and gone. Also gone are the steam locomotives, save one on display at Huntington Park in Newport News, another at the Science Museum of Virginia in Richmond, and a third which was left buried in Richmond's Church Hill Tunnel.

Despite the changes, in the early 21st century, the rails of the Peninsula Subdivision continue to form an important link for Amtrak service from Williamsburg and Newport News. High quality bituminous coal was the motivation for originally building the line, and current owner CSX Transportation continues day and night to deliver massive amounts of it to be loaded onto ships destined for points worldwide.

== Chesapeake and Ohio Railway ==
Opening at the outset of the final quarter of the 19th century, the Chesapeake and Ohio Railway (C&O) was the fulfillment of a long-held goal of Virginians.

Many years before the American Revolution, George Washington, a Virginian licensed as a surveyor by the College of William and Mary during the colonial era, identified the importance of a transportation link between the navigable waters flowing to the Atlantic Ocean and those across the Eastern Continental Divide in the Allegheny Mountains which lead to the Mississippi River and the Gulf of Mexico. He had mapped out several potential routes, and in 1785, he been an early investor in a canal venture.

The James River was navigable east from the Fall Line at Richmond and Manchester to Hampton Roads, the Chesapeake Bay, and the Atlantic Ocean. However, from these sister cities at the head of navigation, seven miles (11 km) of rapids marked the transition to the Piedmont Region, and only very shallow craft such as bateau boats could navigate portions of the river from that point west. Over 250 miles (400 km) from Richmond, across the Blue Ridge Mountains, the Shenandoah Valley, and what was called the "Transmountaine" region in old Virginia, better known in modern times as the Alleghany Mountains, were the falls of the Kanawha River. They similarly marked the head of navigation, but from the west. From the falls of the Kanawha, ships could follow the river to its confluence with the Ohio River, which in turn, flowed west to the Mississippi River. In the earlier periods during which a transportation link was contemplated, the Colony of Virginia (according to the British and its own calculations) extended all the way to the west to what is now Cairo, Illinois, where the Ohio and Mississippi Rivers join. Of course, transportation was not the only obstacle to developing these western regions, as both the French and the Indians did not see it the same way.

In any event, that 250-mile (400 km) gap in the navigable waters became a major focus for Virginians. By the end of the 18th century, efforts to link these heads of navigation were underway with the building of turnpikes and canals. Work on the James River and Kanawha Turnpike and the James River and Kanawha Canal, both prominent infrastructure improvements, was partially funded by the Virginia General Assembly through the Virginia Board of Public Works, although the canal was never completed. By the 1830s, railroads were emerging as a favorable technology for such purposes, and Virginia's network of turnpikes, canals, and railroads grew, substantially guided by the civil engineering skills of Claudius Crozet. Both railroads and canals had conquered the Blue Ridge Mountains and entered the Shenandoah Valley region when the American Civil War broke out in 1861, bringing new work to a virtual halt. By the end of the War in 1865, many of Virginia's railroads, turnpikes, and canals lay in ruins, although the related debt which had helped fund building them was still outstanding.

After the War, part of Virginia had been subdivided to form the new state of West Virginia. Both states were heavily in debt, but wanted to encourage completion of a rail link to the Ohio River, which they saw as vital to rebuilding and expanding commerce. To do without government funding, the state legislatures of both Virginia and West Virginia tried to attract investors several times in 1866 and 1867. Finally, under a plan offered by the Virginia General Assembly, in 1868, the new project was merged with the extant Virginia Central Railroad, connected Richmond with the westernmost point at the time. The new enterprise was to be known as the Chesapeake and Ohio Railway (C&O).

The head of the Virginia Central Railroad was former Confederate General Williams Carter Wickham of Hanover County, Virginia. He was a descendant of several former Virginia governors and the grandson of constitutional lawyer John Wickham, who had set up shop in Richmond after the American Revolutionary War and served as a respected agent of financial interests in England and Scotland. However, in the volatile period of the late 1860s, General Wickham failed in his efforts to secure either southern or British financing as had been hoped. Finally, he journeyed to New York City, where he successfully attracted the interest of industrialist Collis P. Huntington and gained access to the new financing needed. Huntington had been one of the "Big Four", the men involved in building the Central Pacific portion of the Transcontinental Railroad, which was at that time just reaching completion.

Under the new leadership and financing, during 1869–1873 the hard work of building through West Virginia was done with large crews working from both ends, much in the manner the Union Pacific Railroad and the Central Pacific Railroad had been built to complete their transcontinental rails.

The final spike ceremony for the 428-mile (689 km) long line from Richmond to the Ohio River was held on 29 January 1873 at Hawks Nest railroad bridge in New River Gorge, near the town of Ansted, West Virginia.

== Huntington's vision for the Peninsula ==
Virginia's long dream for the C&O had been trade with the west, and Huntington's work accomplished that by 1873. However, he and others also realized that the new railroads for the first time offered a practical way to ship coal. The region's high quality bituminous coal had been known to be among West Virginia's vast natural resources, but until now, there had been no way to transport it to markets. The new C&O railroad provided a method of transporting this valuable product out of the mountains and east to Richmond, where ocean-going shipping called. However, one problem they faced was that depth of the channels of the tidal portion of the river to reach Richmond was insufficient to accommodate the draft required by the large colliers.

As a young man in 1837, Collis P. Huntington had visited the rural village known as Newport News Point in Warwick County at the mouth of the James River on the harbor of Hampton Roads. It later became clear that Huntington had never forgotten his 1837 visit to Newport News Point. By the early 1870s, he and his associates began buying up land on the Peninsula, nowhere more intensely than in Warwick County, where their Old Dominion Land Company soon owned enough for a railroad line, a coal pier and even more. In 1873, Major Robert H. Temple surveyed a railway line from Richmond to the mouth of the James River.

== Building the Peninsula Extension ==
To extend the line east to Hampton Roads from the end of the former Virginia Central Railroad at Richmond in the Shockhoe Valley, there was only a single major obstacle: Richmond's Church Hill, occupied by some of the city's older and nicer buildings. From there east, the only significant obstacles across the gentle coastal plains a distance of about 75 miles (121 km) were several rivers and some wetlands down the Peninsula to reach Newport News.

The initial solution to overcoming that major obstacle in Richmond was the Church Hill Tunnel. The tracks to the new tunnel left the old Virginia Central line west of 17th street and curved southeasterly to enter the tunnel east of N. 18th Street and north of E. Marshall Street under Cedar Street. The east end of the 4,000-foot (1,200 m) long tunnel appeared just north of today's Williamsburg Road near 31st Street below Libby Terrace Park.

The construction of the Church Hill Tunnel was problematic. Unlike the bedrock through which the C&O carved its western tunnels, in Richmond, the blue marl clay shrink-swell soil tended to change with rainfall and groundwater. There were cave-ins during the construction. Ten workers were reportedly killed. The tunnel was completed and opened in 1875. East of the tunnel, the C&O established its Fulton Yard, with a capacity of thousands of rail cars, a roundhouse to service the steam locomotives, and other support facilities. Planning and right-of-way acquisition for the Peninsula Extension took another 5 years.

From Fulton Yard, after climbing out of the James River Valley, the surveyors generally followed the high ground of the Peninsula between the rivers which border it. As a result, the route selected faced only gentle grades through coastal plains of the Tidewater region of Virginia, dropping only about 30 feet (9.1 m) in elevation, from Richmond (54 feet above sea-level) to Newport News (at 15 feet (4.6 m) above sea-level). The new C&O line ran through several American Civil War battlefield areas in eastern Henrico County and then through Charles City County, New Kent County, James City County, York County and Warwick County. It crossed the Chickahominy River south of Bottoms Bridge, Diascund Creek south of Lanexa, and the Warwick River east of Lee Hall.

Construction on the tracks between Richmond and Newport News began in Newport News in December 1880. In a method used before by Huntington, work also began from Richmond the following February, and crews at each end worked toward each other. The crews met and completed the line 1.25 miles (2.01 km) west of Williamsburg on 16 October 1881 although temporary tracks had been installed in some areas to speed completion. This was just in the nick of time because Huntington and his associates had promised they would provide rail service to Yorktown, where the United States was celebrating the centennial of the surrender of the British troops under Lord Cornwallis at Yorktown in 1781. (That event was considered most symbolic of the end of the conflict, which was later formalized by the Treaty of Paris in 1783). Only 3 days after the last spike ceremony, on 19 October, the first passenger train from Newport News took local residents and national officials to the Cornwallis Surrender Centennial Celebration at Yorktown on temporary tracks which were laid from the main line at the new Lee Hall Depot to Yorktown, and then removed afterward.

== New railroad line's impact on the Peninsula ==
The Peninsula Extension ran directly through Williamsburg, a city whose site had been selected in 1632 for the very reason that it was on the center ridge, or spine, of the land between the adjacent rivers. After the capital of Virginia had moved to Richmond in 1780, Williamsburg had been reduced in prominence. It was not sited on a major water route and in the 18th and early 19th century, transportation in Virginia was largely by navigable rivers and in some cases, canals. A canal project linking the colonial capital city to the James and York rivers had been planned and begun for Williamsburg. However, it was never completed due to the American Revolutionary War. Although new railroads seem to be springing up in many places after 1830, until now, none had come to Williamsburg or the lower Peninsula. Until the coming of the railroad, the areas furthest from the rivers were generally the least-populated, excepting the old colonial capital of Williamsburg.

The Peninsula Extension was good news for the farmers and merchants of the Virginia Peninsula, and they generally welcomed the railroad. Williamsburg allowed tracks to be placed down the main street of town, Duke of Gloucester Street, and even directly through the ruins of the historic capitol building. These tracks did not last long, as some landowners around the Capitol end of the city were upset. So, the C&O main line only went down Duke of Gloucester Street from 16 October to 13 December 1881. After that date, the railroad was realigned to its current state north of Williamsburg. The leaders of Elizabeth City County and Warwick County even adjusted their mutual boundary slightly to allow the railroad to be completely within Warwick County at one location.

Although the main business purpose was unquestionably shipping eastbound coal to Newport News, the C&O dutifully established freight and passenger stations at frequent intervals along the way. In addition to many small depots, larger facilities were located at Providence Forge, Williamsburg, and at Lee Hall. At Newport News, an ornate Victorian style passenger station was built right on the waterfront.

== Hampton Branch: east to Phoebus, Fort Monroe ==
No sooner had the tracks to the coal pier at Newport News been completed in late 1881 than the same construction crews were put to work on what would later be called the Peninsula Subdivision's Hampton Branch. From a junction with the main line a few miles west of the coal pier which was named Old Point Junction, work began easterly a distance of about 10 miles (16 km) into Elizabeth City County toward Hampton and Old Point Comfort, where the United States Army base at Fort Monroe was a fortress situated to guard the entrance to the harbor of Hampton Roads from the Chesapeake Bay (and the Atlantic Ocean).

The tracks were completed about 9 miles (14 km) to the town which became Phoebus in December 1882. A passenger and freight station was opened. When the town was incorporated as a political subdivision of Virginia in 1900, it was named Phoebus in honor of its leading citizen, Harrison Phoebus, who is largely credited with prevailing upon the railroad to build the branch line to Old Point Comfort.

From Phoebus, an extension across Mill Creek to reach Fort Monroe required a 2,800-foot (850 m) long trestle and was not completed until 1890. At that time, a passenger and freight facilities were also added. On the base, the U.S. Army built connecting tracks and operated its own locomotive for a number of years.

At Old Point Comfort, in addition to the Army base at Fort Monroe, the Hampton Branch served both the older Hygeia Hotel and the new Hotel Chamberlin, popular destinations for civilians. During the first half of the 20th century, excursion trains were operated to reach nearby Buckroe Beach, where an amusement park was among the attractions that brought church groups and vacationers.

== Newport News ==
No place on the Peninsula benefited more from the completion of the C&O's Peninsula Subdivision than southeastern Warwick County, soon to become better known as Newport News. The Chesapeake and Ohio Railway became one of the country's wealthiest as West Virginia coal moved eastward to the coal piers. The coal volume of the C&O, combined with that of the Norfolk and Western Railway (N&W) shipping from Lambert's Point and that of the later-completed Virginian Railway (VGN) at Sewell's Point turned the harbor of Hampton Roads, the East Coast of the United States' largest ice-free port, into the largest coal export point in the world by 1915.

Collis P. Huntington and his associates set developing the tiny unincorporated community at Newport New Point. His Old Dominion Land Company built the landmark Hotel Warwick, opened in 1883, which played a significant role in the development of the city. The hotel dominated the landscape, and was the civic and commercial center of the area during its early years. The first bank at Newport News, the first newspaper, the U.S. post office, the federal customs office, and even the municipal government of Warwick County were each located within the Hotel Warwick, at least for a time. It was also the site in 1886 of the organizational meeting for the Chesapeake Dry Dock and Construction Company. The latter evolved into the Newport News Shipbuilding and Dry Dock Company.

For a brief time, Warwick County shifted the location of its county seat to Newport News from the historic location at Denbigh, where it had been situated since colonial times. However, the growth at Newport News was such that, in 1896, it became one of only two Virginia localities to ever become an independent city from Warwick County without the additional stepping-stone of first becoming an incorporated town. (In the aftermath of that event, the county seat was returned to Denbigh. However, in 1958, voters of both communities chose to reunite, consolidating Newport News with the rest of the former county into an even bigger single independent city, one of the largest in Virginia in land area.)

== Communities, locations over the years ==
During its more than 125-year existence, the Peninsula Subdivision has continued to serve coal and passenger traffic, now operated by CSX Transportation and Amtrak. In earlier times, it was an important factor in commerce and growth of some of the communities it has served, as well as for the United States military, particularly during World War I and World War II when the C&O was invaluable to the Hampton Roads Port of Embarkation.

=== Richmond ===
In the 1890s, the C&O acquired the Richmond and Allegheny Railroad (R&A) which had been built east from the Blue Ridge Mountains along the towpath of the James River and Kanawha Canal, proving an alternate "water level" route to Richmond following the north bank of the James River.

To create a good connection to the existing line at Fulton yard, and as an added benefit, avoid the troublesome Church Hill tunnel, the C&O constructed a 3-mile-long double track elevated viaduct along the riverfront extending between the area of Hollywood Cemetery east past downtown Richmond, the Shockoe Valley, and Church Hill to join the Peninsula Subdivision at Fulton Yard (east of the tunnel). At the same time, a new Main Street Station was built for passenger services adjacent to the viaduct. Both the landmark Main Street Station and the viaduct, believed to be the longest in the United States, were still in use as of 2008.

After completion of the riverfront viaduct in 1901, the Church Hill Tunnel fell into disuse for over 20 years. Then in 1925, to add capacity, the railroad began efforts to restore it to usable condition. On 2 October, while repairs were under way, a work train was trapped by a collapse near the western end. Two workmen crawled under flat cars and escaped out the eastern end of the tunnel, and two bodies including the engineer's were recovered, but two other workers were unaccounted for. During the next week, the community anxiously watched rescue efforts, but each time progress was made, further cave-ins occurred. Eventually, the Virginia State Corporation Commission (SCC), which regulated railroads in Virginia, ordered the tunnel sealed for safety reasons. Left inside was the work train complete with a 4-4-0 steam locomotive. Over the years, portions of the tunnel have collapsed, once claiming several houses.

The circa-1901 Main Street Station was reopened to Amtrak passenger service in 2004. Expanded use as an intermodal facility for additional passenger trains and local transit bus service is planned.

=== Penniman ===
In 1916, the E.I. DuPont Nemours company announced that it would develop a large black powder and shell-loading plant facility six miles northeast of Williamsburg in York County. The plant as built was large enough to have ten thousand employees.

The new plant and the new town for the workers and families were named Penniman. At its peak, Penniman had housing for 15,000, and included dormitories, a store, a post office, bank, police station, church, YWCA, YMCA, Mess Halls canteen, and a hospital.

The C&O built a spur track on the Peninsula Subdivision from a point about 2 miles (3.2 km) east of Williamsburg (mp 33) to Penniman. The C&O depot at Penniman opened on 1 June 1916. By the fall of 1918, Penniman was a town of about fifteen thousand inhabitants, and there were three passenger trains a day each way between Williamsburg and Penniman. After World War I, the area was largely abandoned, and then placed into use again in World War II under the name Cheatham Annex as a supply depot for the U.S. Navy. Rail service became inactive, and grade crossings along the spur line at the State Route 143 (Merrimack Trail) and several other points were removed in 2008.

=== Camp Peary ===
During World War II, beginning in 1942, the U.S. Navy took over a large area on the north side of the Virginia Peninsula in York County which became known as Camp Peary, initially for use as a Seabee training base. The C&O extended a spur track from its main line tracks to the site and established Magruder Station near the former unincorporated town of Magruder.

The spur tracks were later removed. A portion of the old right-of-way which is not located on federal property now forms a rail trail in Waller Mill Park.

=== Fort Eustis ===
The Fort Eustis Military Railroad is a United States Army rail transportation system existing entirely within the post boundaries of the United States Army Transportation Center and Fort Eustis (USATCFE), Fort Eustis, Virginia. It has served to provide railroad operation and maintenance training to the US Army and to carry out selected materiel movement missions both within the post and in interchange with the Peninsula Subsdivision via a junction at Lee Hall. It consists of 31 miles (50 km) of track broken into three subdivisions with numerous sidings, spurs, stations and facilities.

=== Oyster Point ===
The station at Oyster Point in Warwick County became a shipping point for the area's watermen during the years of extensive oyster harvesting. Although oystering has dwindled greatly in the years since, Oyster Point, now within the City of Newport News, became the site for a new city center development. The Oyster Point City Center, developed as a New Urbanism project, has been touted as the new "downtown" because of its new geographic centrality in the area.

=== Norge ===
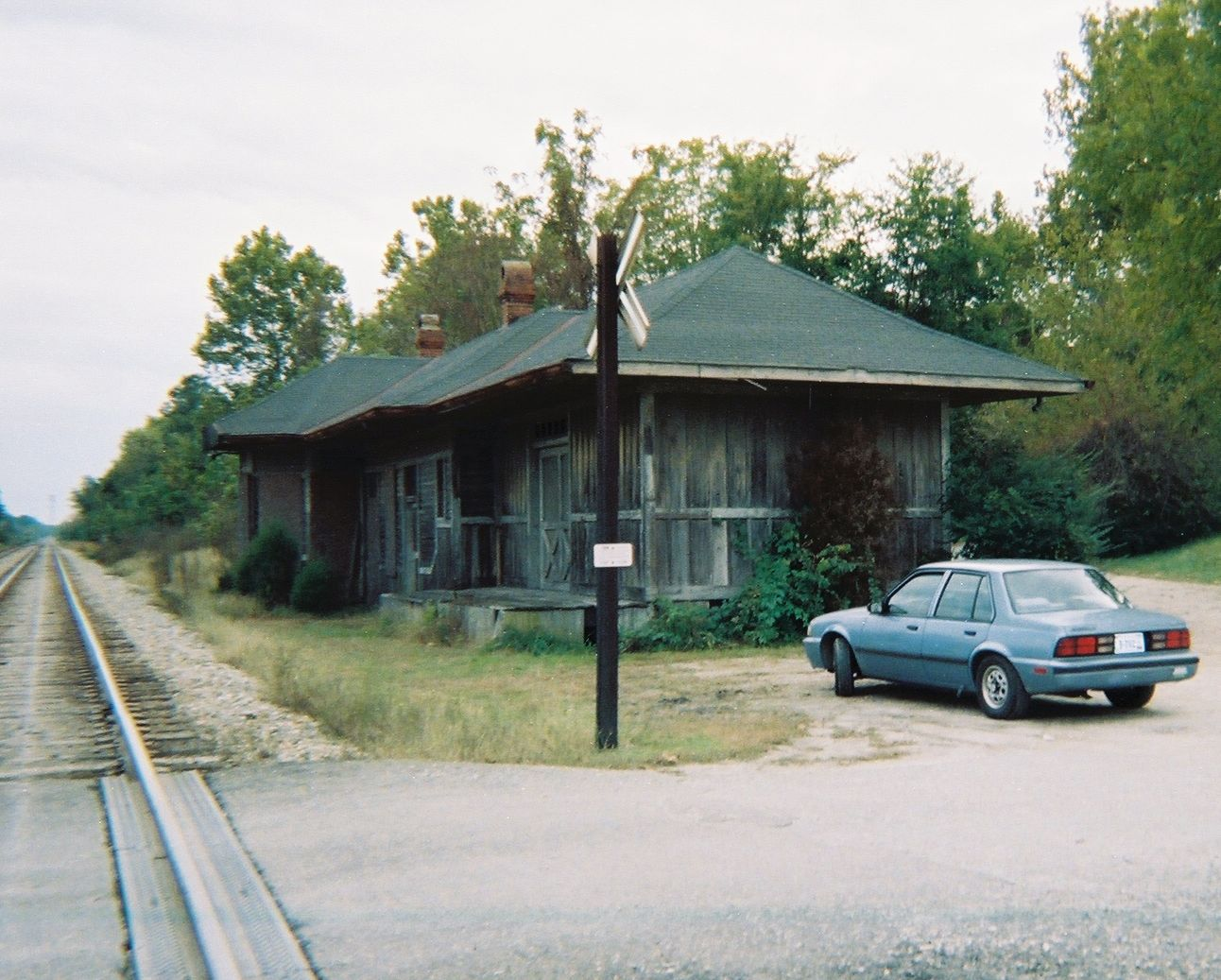
The C&O railway station on the Peninsula Extension of the railroad at Norge in James City County, Virginia was a community focal point. Seen here in 2005 preserved but in disuse, the following year it was relocated to public property nearby where work began for it to be reopened as museum.

Beginning in the 1890s, C&O land agent Carl M. Bergh, a Norwegian-American who had earlier farmed in the mid-western states, realized that the gentler climate of eastern Virginia and depressed post-Civil War land prices would be attractive to his fellow Scandinavians who were farming in other northern parts of the country. He began sending out notices, and selling land. Soon there was a substantial concentration of relocated Americans of Norwegian, Swedish, and Danish descent in the area. The location earlier known as Vaiden's Siding on the railroad just west of Williamsburg in James City County was renamed Norge. These citizens and their descendants found the area conditions favorable as described by Bergh, and many became leading merchants, tradespersons, and farmers in the community. These transplanted Americans brought some new blood and enthusiasm to the old colonial capitol area.

The railroad has such community significance to Norge many generations later that, in February 2006, the historic Norge railroad station building (circa 1908) of the Chesapeake and Ohio Railway was relocated about 1-mile (1.6 km) to a site adjacent to the James City County Branch of the Williamsburg Regional Library on Croaker Road. Community volunteers set to work providing a new foundation and restoring the exterior, with additional improvements set for the future. A community project, the local Virginia Gazette newspaper reported that in January 2009, following historical research, the Norge Station had been repainted in its original livery, featuring a bright orange as the primary color.

The former C&O station from Ewell also survives, and is in an adaptive reuse. However, the other James City County stations which were located at Diascund, Toano, Kelton (Lightfoot) and Grove are all gone without a trace.

=== Williamsburg ===
In Williamsburg, a number of years before the Restoration, the C&O tracks initially ran down Duke of Gloucester Street and through the grounds of the former Capitol at the eastern end. In 1907, the C&O replaced its passenger station with a fine brick colonial style structure to accommodate the patrons of the tercentennial (300th anniversary) of the founding of Jamestown in 1607. Around this time, the ladies of Williamsburg who were among the early organizers of the group which became Preservation Virginia (formerly known as the Association for the Preservation of Virginia Antiquities) successfully prevailed upon the Old Dominion Land Company to turn over ownership of the capital historic site.

Beginning in 1926, Reverend Dr. W.A.R. Goodwin led a campaign to preserve and restore Williamsburg's colonial-era properties. He was successful in gaining the interest and financial support of philanthropists Abby Aldrich Rockefeller and her husband, Standard Oil heir John D. Rockefeller Jr. The Rockefellers made historic Bassett hall at Williamsburg their second home for several months each year, and took substantial interest in details of "The Restoration" which created Colonial Williamsburg. Partially on the key property donated to the APVA by Dominion Land Company, a major centerpiece, the brick Capitol was recreated, as well as dozens of other buildings.

As part of the project to recreate the Governor's Palace, in 1935, the 1907 C&O station was replaced with an even finer one located about a half mile west of the original site. Later owned by the Colonial Williamsburg Foundation, the 1935 structure itself has been carefully maintained and modernized and serves as the intermodal Williamsburg Transportation Center, offering complete range of services of its type in the country.

=== Lee Hall ===
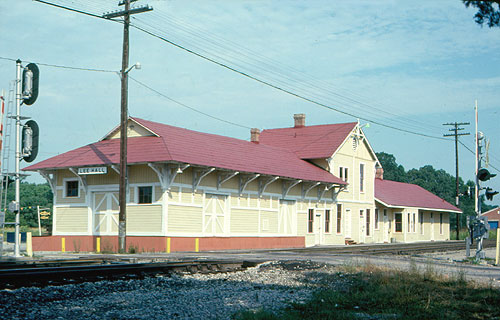
Lee Hall in 1983, during service as a stop on Amtrak's Colonial.

Lee Hall, the westernmost station in Warwick County, was named for the nearby mansion of Richard Decatur Lee. During the 1862 Peninsula Campaign of the American Civil War, it served as the headquarters of Confederate General John B. Magruder. A tiny village which came to be known as Lee Hall, Virginia developed after the railroad opened and built the Lee Hall Depot.

Lee Hall Depot became a bustling railroad station after the 1918 establishment nearby of Camp Abraham Eustis, later renamed Fort Eustis at Mulberry Island. The depot was strategically located along the mainline midway between Skiffe's Creek and the Warwick River and was close to the access point to the base. Lee Hall Depot handled heavy troop movements during both World Wars.

In 2009, the station was moved 165 feet, across CSX-owned tracks, to prevent it from being demolished by CSX. The building was reopened as a local history museum in July 2021.

As of 2022, the Lee Hall Depot is the only surviving C&O structure of its type on the Peninsula and the only surviving C&O station which was located in Warwick County, the others were formerly located at Oriana, Oyster Point, Morrison, and Newport News.

== CSX Ownership ==
The Peninsula Subdivision is a railroad line owned by CSX Transportation in the U.S. State of Virginia. It was formerly part of the CSX Huntington East Division. It became part of the CSX Florence Division on 20 June 2016. The line runs from Newport News, Virginia to Richmond, Virginia for a total of 82.3 miles (132.4 km). At its east end the line dead-ends, and at its west end in Richmond, the line continues west as the Rivanna Subdivision with connections to the Bellwood Subdivision and the Buckingham Branch Railroad.
