= Governor's Land Archeological District =

Historic district in Virginia, United States

- U.S. National Register of Historic Places
- U.S. Historic district
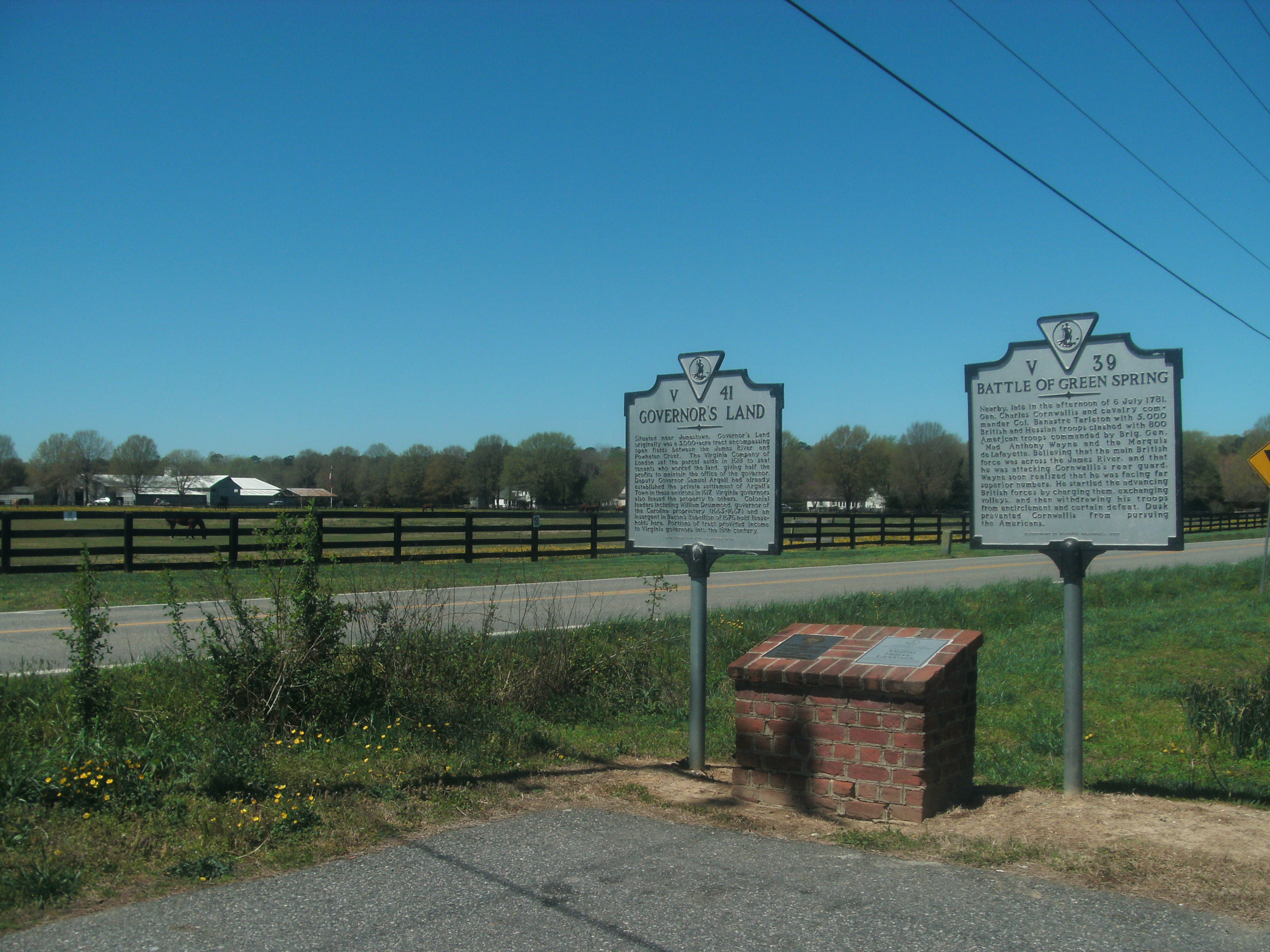
- The historic marker for Governor's Land, with some of the farmland adjacent; the marker is the location at which the plaques for the Virginia Landmarks Register and National Register of Historic Places have been installed
- Nearest city: Jamestown, Virginia
- Area: 2,068 acres (837 ha)
- NRHP reference No.: 73002025
- Added to NRHP: September 21, 1973

The Governor's Land Archeological District encompasses an area upstream from Jamestown, Virginia (now in James County) that was historically reserved for the use of the Virginia Colony's royal governor. The territory includes a settlement established in 1617 called Argall's Settlement. The district covers 2,000 acres (810 ha) of the 3,000-acre (1,200 ha) area originally set aside.

The district was listed on the National Register of Historic Places in 1973.

== See also ==
- National Register of Historic Places listings in James City County, Virginia
