= Walkers, Virginia =

Unincorporated community in Virginia, US

Coordinates: 37°24′56″N 76°56′24″W

Walkers is an unincorporated community in New Kent County, Virginia, United States.

The community is most notable for the presence of Walkers Dam, maintained by Newport News Waterworks on the Chickahominy River.
