= Stone House Site =

Archaeological site in Virginia, United States

- U.S. National Register of Historic Places
- Nearest city: Toano, Virginia
- Area: 30 acres (12 ha)
- NRHP reference No.: 73002024
- Added to NRHP: August 14, 1973

The Stone House Site is a historic house site in James City County, Virginia, near Toano. It is the location of house ruins of uncertain age. The ruins are of a stone house, built in a location where materials transport is not easy. The house was known to be of great antiquity in the 19th century. The foundations of the house are cut sandstone blocks that are 2 feet (0.61 m) thick.

The site was listed on the National Register of Historic Places in 1973.

== See also ==
- National Register of Historic Places listings in James City County, Virginia
