= Chickahominy Shipyard Archeological Site =

Archaeological site in Virginia, United States

- U.S. National Register of Historic Places
- Virginia Landmarks Register
- Nearest city: Toano, Virginia
- Area: 136 acres (55 ha)
- Built: 1777
- NRHP reference No.: 79003048
- VLR No.: 047-0078

Significant dates
- Added to NRHP: June 28, 1979
- Designated VLR: February 26, 1979

The Chickahominy Shipyard Archeological Site is a historic archaeological site located near Toano, Virginia. The shipyard was established in 1776 on the Chickahominy River by the Virginia Committee on Safety for the construction of a small navy to protect the Virginia colony during the American Revolution. It remained in production until 1781, when the British seized and burned the shipyard. The site consists of both submerged and dryland components.

It was listed on the National Register of Historic Places in 1979.
