= Croaker, Virginia =

Unincorporated community in Virginia, United States

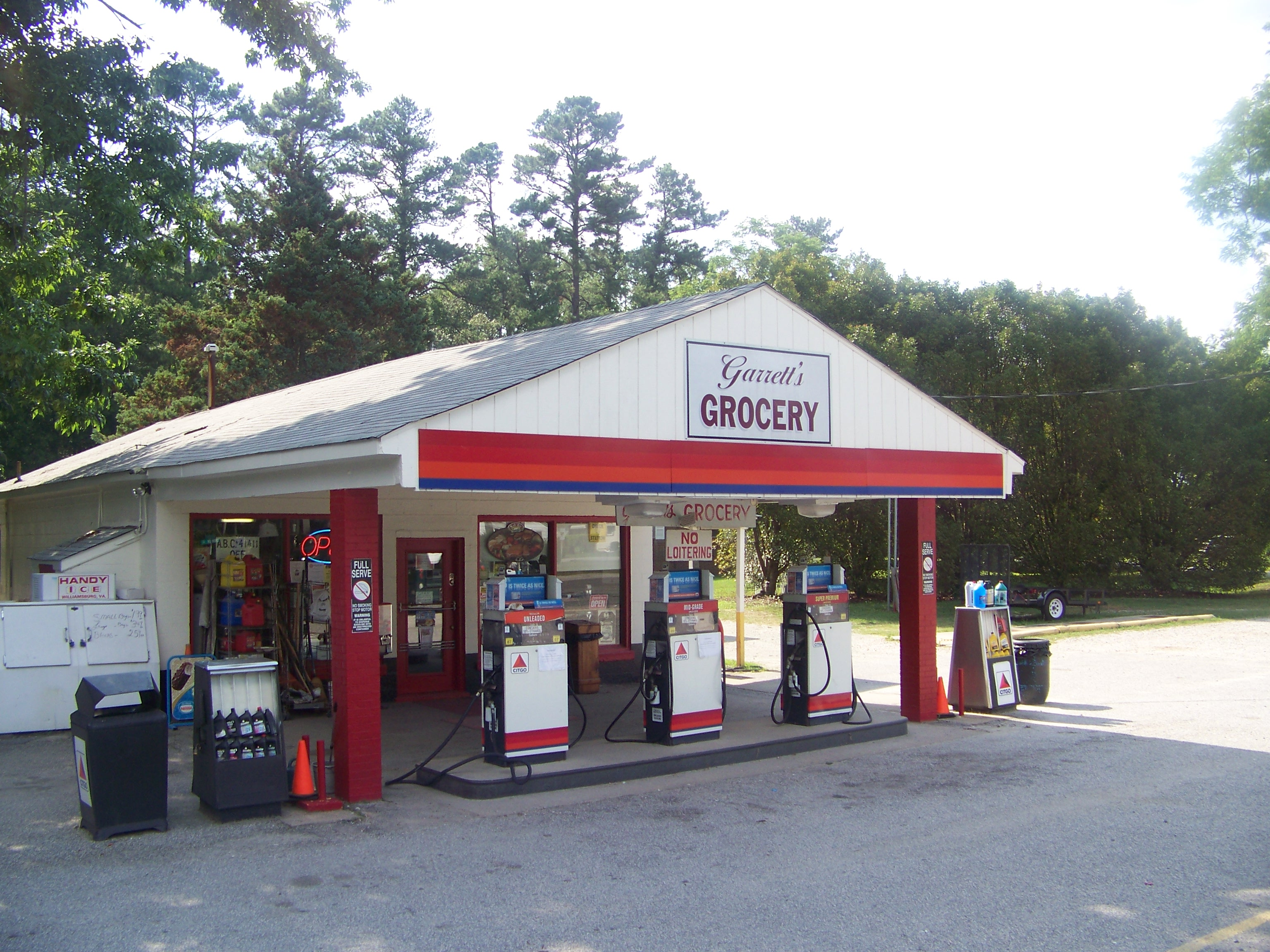
Garrett's Grocery (photo taken in 2007) was the oldest store in Croaker. It closed its doors the last day of 2013.

Garrett's Grocery opened in 1909.

Croaker is an unincorporated community in James City County, Virginia, United States on the south bank of the York River 10 miles downstream from West Point. The York River is formed from the confluence of the Mattaponi River and the Pamunkey River at West Point. The York River empties into the Chesapeake Bay about 30 miles downstream from Croaker.

== History ==
The name "Croaker" is believed to have derived from the abundant quantity of Atlantic croaker (Micropogonias undulatus), an inshore, bottom-dwelling fish found in the Chesapeake Bay at the mouth of the York River.

The town of Croaker was known in its early history as Taskinas Plantation, then Hollywood (due to the many holly trees). "Taskinask" was designated by the Tobacco Inspection Act of 1730 as the site public tobacco warehouse where local planters stored their crops to be shipped to England.

Croaker had several stores, two schools, a church, and several houses by the early 20th century. Some of the shopkeepers who established a presence before 1950 were members of the Garrett family. Garrett's Grocery opened in 1909 and was run by five generations of the family until its closing on December 31, 2013. Croaker General Store took over the building and opened up on May 25, 2015.

In February 2006, the historic Norge railroad station (circa 1908) of the Peninsula Extension of the Chesapeake and Ohio Railway (C&O) was relocated about 1 mile to a site adjacent to the James City County Branch of the Williamsburg Regional Library (opened in 1996) on Croaker Road. The following month, work was underway to set a new foundation for the building.

York River State Park, opened in 1980, is located at Croaker. In the state park, the historical Croaker Landing is an archaeological site listed in the National Register of Historic Places since 1987.

While much of Croaker is now within York River State Park, the remaining area is divided among residential, farming, and woodland area. Interstate 64 skirts the edge of the community, and it is accessed from Exit 231, which is signed "Croaker-Norge." The old Richmond-Williamsburg Stage Road, now U.S. Route 60, also is nearby.

== President heads ==
There is also a farm where 20-foot busts of the former presidents all the way up to George W. Bush are located. However, they are in a moderate state of disrepair. Said busts were once located at an old tourist attraction called Presidents Park, which went bankrupt in 2010, but have since been relocated to 8212 Croaker Road, at the site of local recycling company Hampton Roads Materials.

The movement of the busts from Presidents Park to their current location caused damage to the busts but saved them from being destroyed altogether. Using cranes, each bust was carefully lifted from its base, resulting in damage to each sculpture during the removal process. The crane was affixed to a steel frame within the busts via a hole created atop each sculpture's head; Smithsonian Magazine comments that the resulting hole in the back of Abraham Lincoln's head is reminiscent of Lincoln's assassination. Following this process, every president's bust was transported on a flatbed truck to the field where they now reside.

The busts are now available to visitors for viewing at specific times throughout the year through organized tours. In prior years, the busts had been off-limits to visitors, owing to the site's then-lack of permits for tourist use.
