= Presidents Park =

Sculpture park in Virginia, 2004 to 2010

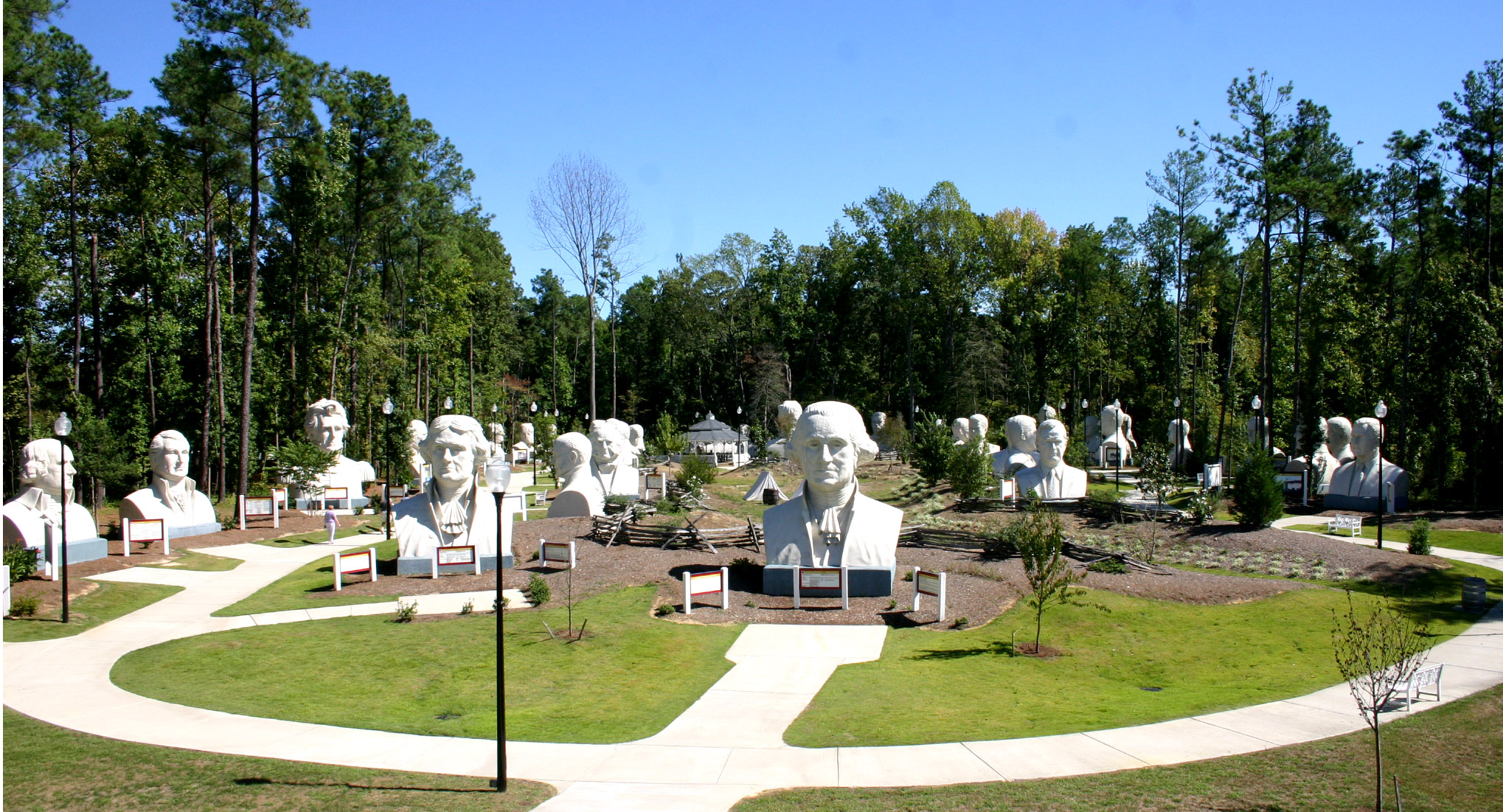
- The original park in 2005

- Presidents Park was located in Southeastern Virginia Presidents Park (the United States)
- Established: March 2004
- Dissolved: September 30, 2010
- Location: Williamsburg VA, U.S.
- Coordinates: 37°15′39″N 76°38′42″W
- Type: Sculpture park
- Collections: Busts of the first 43 presidents, spread over 10 acres (4.0 ha)

Presidents Park was a ten-acre (4.0 ha) sculpture park and associated indoor museum formerly located in Williamsburg, Virginia in the United States. The park contained 18-to-20-foot (5.5 to 6.1 m) high busts of the presidents of the United States from George Washington to George W. Bush.

After the park closed, the presidential heads were transferred to a nearby private field, where they have been decaying due to exposure to the elements. The unusual nature of the decayed presidential heads has gained attention, and the location now offers periodic tours.

== History ==
=== Original park ===
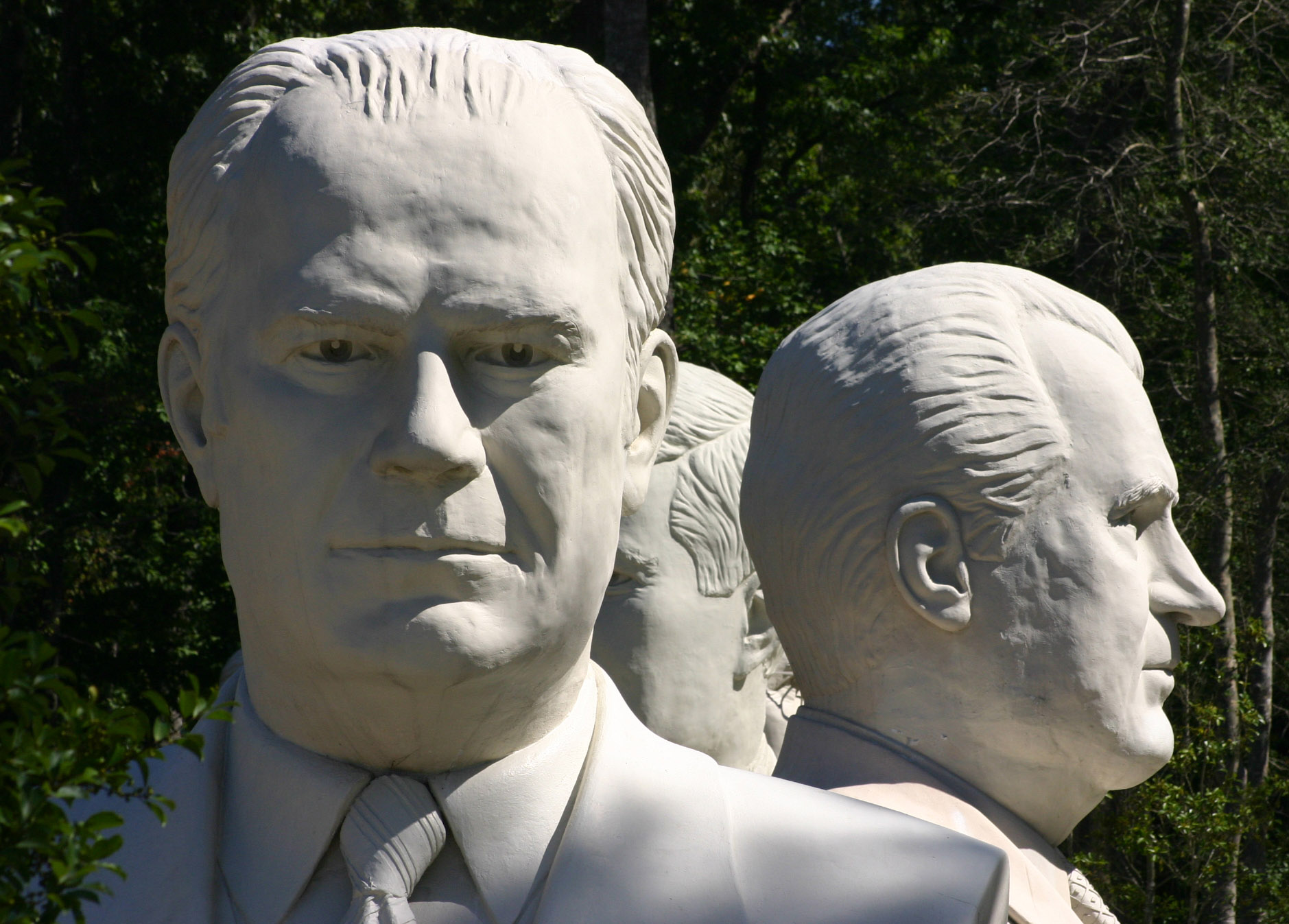
Busts of Gerald Ford and Richard Nixon (2005)

In the year 2000, when returning from a trip to Canada, Houston artist David Adickes was inspired as he drove past Mount Rushmore to sculpt a series of statues.

From 2000 through 2004, Adickes produced the statues in his studio in Houston, Texas.

In March 2004, local visitor attraction entrepreneur Everette H. "Haley" Newman III opened Presidents Park to display the statues. He had been slowly taking delivery of the busts since 2000.

On September 30, 2010 (15 years ago), the park, which had been having financial troubles, closed permanently.

On September 28, 2012, creditors put the land of the park up for auction, but not the busts themselves, after a foreclosure auction that had been originally scheduled for April 26, 2012 was cancelled without explanation. The location was eventually purchased by a rental car company.

=== Current location of statues ===
By January 2013, Howard Hankins, a builder who had helped construct the park and had been hired to demolish it, had moved the busts to private storage at a nearby farm in Croaker, Virginia.

In 2017, National Geographic showcased a video in which Mr. Hankins expressed a hope to rehabilitate the statues for a new park in the future.

Many of the presidential heads had sustained damage in the move and further decayed due to being out in the open elements without any regular restorative maintenance. The unusual nature of the decayed presidential heads gained attention, and the location now offers periodic tours and photography workshops under the name "The Presidents Heads".

== Similar park in South Dakota ==
Artist David Adickes sculpted a second set of Presidential busts. They were placed on display at a similar outdoor park museum setting in Lead, South Dakota that was operated by the artist himself, until it also closed after financial difficulties.

As of 2015, some of the South Dakota busts could still be seen at various RV parks and hotels around the Dakotas:

- The busts of Presidents John F. Kennedy, Ronald Reagan, and George W. Bush were located near Mount Rushmore at the Southern Hills RV Park and Campground in Hermosa, South Dakota.
- President Abraham Lincoln's bust graced the Lincoln RV Park on U.S. 85 south of Williston, North Dakota.
- President Theodore Roosevelt's bust was stationed at the Roosevelt Inn in Watford City, North Dakota.
