= Paspahegh =

Historic Native American tribe

Pasapahegh
Total population
- Extinct as tribe

Regions with significant populations
- Virginia, Charles City and James City counties

Languages
- Algonquian

Religion
- Native

Related ethnic groups
- Powhatan Confederacy

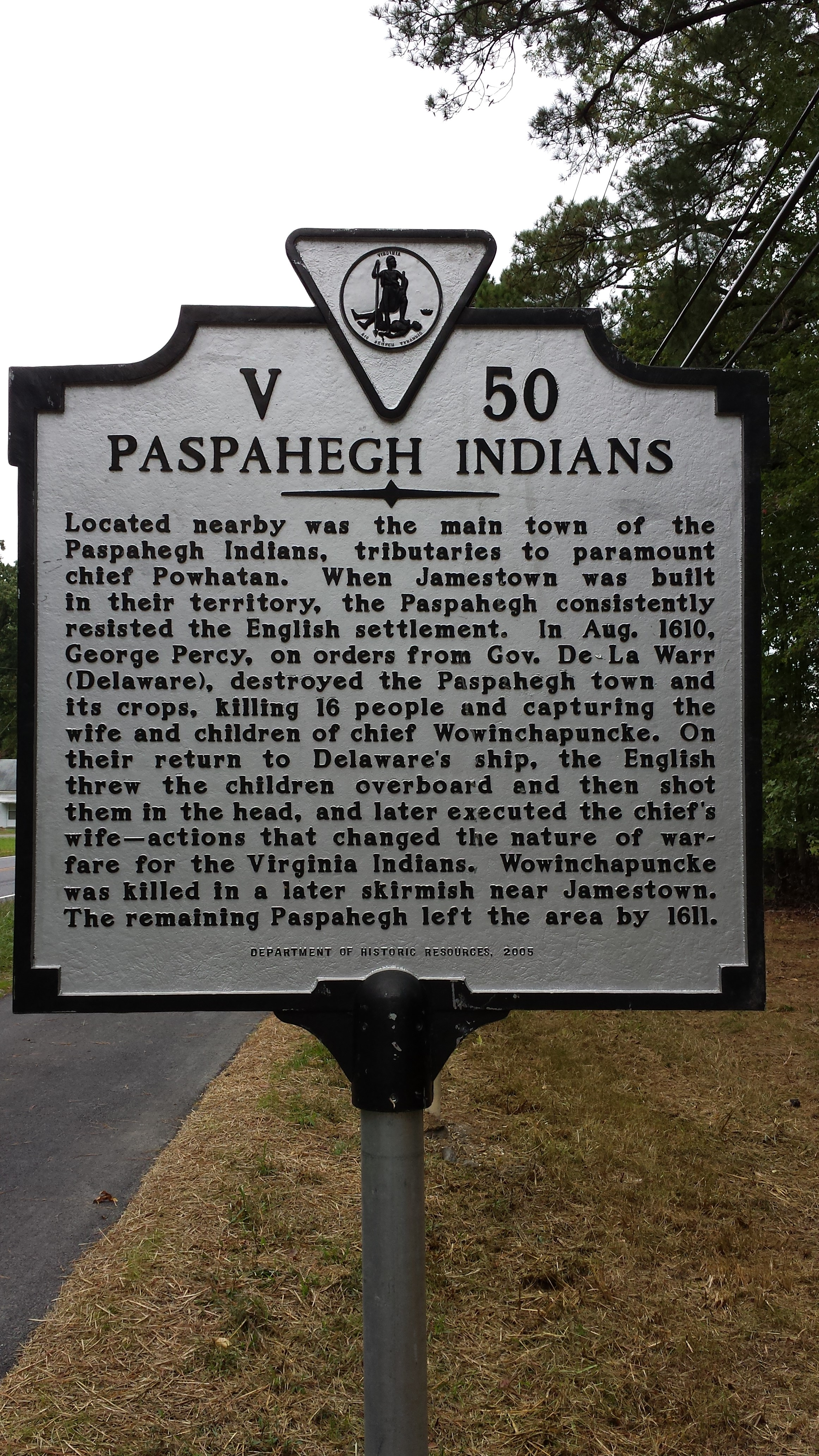
Paspahegh historical marker erected in Charles City County along Virginia State Route 5 by the Department of Historic Resources, 2005

The Paspahegh were a Native American member of the Powhatan Confederacy, joining the Confederacy around 1596 or 1597. The Paspahegh lived in present-day Charles City and James City counties, Virginia. The Powhatan Confederacy included many Indigenous peoples of the Northeastern Woodlands who spoke related Eastern Algonquian languages.

The Paspehegh were among the earliest tribes to interact with British colonists, who established their first permanent settlement in the Virginia Colony at Jamestown in their territory, beginning on May 14, 1607. Because of conflict with the colonists and likely exposure to infectious diseases, the Paspehegh appear to have been destroyed as a tribe by early 1611 and disappeared from the historical record.

== Timeline of interaction with colonists ==
=== 1607 ===
- May 4 – While exploring the James River, an English party first make contact with the Paspahegh, enjoy a feast with them, and listen to, but are unable to understand, an oration by the Paspahegh weroance, Wowinchapuncke (Wowinchoppunck).
- May 14 – A group of English colonists begin their occupation of Jamestown Island, an island in Paspehegh territory where Indians sometimes camped, though they did not have permanent habitations. The colonists begin building a defensive fort on the island. A few Paspehegh braves paddled in on canoes around midnight to investigate what they were doing, but fled when two watchmen sounded the alarm. A few days later, two well-dressed and highly decorated Paspehegh messengers arrive at the fort to announce that their weroance would soon be paying them a visit, and bringing a "fat Deare" with him.
- May 18 – Wowinchapuncke and one hundred armed men visit Jamestown fort. According to George Percy's 1608 account, Wowinchapuncke indicated that he would grant the settlers "as much land as we would desire to take," although later historians contend that it is highly dubious that he would have said any such thing. The Paspahegh leave in anger after a violent dispute over an English hatchet.
- May 19 – Percy and three or four other colonists explore the woods on foot and discover a nearby Paspahegh village; they receive gifts of tobacco, but return to the fort quickly after they see an armed brave suddenly plunge into the woods, probably to notify Wowinchapuncke.
- May 20 – Forty Paspahegh braves arrive at the fort with a deer for feasting; they engage in target practice for the colonists, demonstrating that their bows were capable of piercing wood, but not steel.
- May 26 – While half of the English party is away with Christopher Newport exploring upriver in Weyanoke, Appomattoc, Arrohattoc and Powhatan territory, a combined force of 400 Paspahegh, Quiockahannock, Weyanoke, Appomattoc and Chiskiack assault the fort. They withdraw upon receiving gunfire from the colonists; at least three Indians and one colonist are killed, with several wounded on both sides. Indian raiding and harassment continues for a week or two as the colonists hasten to complete their fort.
- June 15 – The leader or Mamanatowick of the Powhatan confederacy, Powhatan (Wahunsunacock) announces a ceasefire, causing Paspahegh raids to cease abruptly.
- November – The Paspehegh return an English boy who had run away, confirming their intentions are no longer hostile. Faced with starvation, the settlers turn to the neighboring nations, including the Paspehegh, for help, buying small amounts of corn from them on three occasions. However, John Smith wrote of one of these occasions in ungrateful terms, calling the Paspahegh a "churlish and treacherous nation".
- December – While exploring the Chickahominy country, Smith stumbles upon a huge hunting party of several nations, including the Paspehegh, being led by Opechancanough, brother of Powhatan. Smith is captured and taken around Powhatan territory as an involuntary guest, eventually meeting the Mamanatowick, who orders the colonists to leave Paspahegh territory. He suggests they take up residence at Capahosic, a satellite village near his own capital Werowocomoco, where he would provide them food and security in exchange for metal tools. Smith promises to comply and is released on January 1, 1608.

=== 1608 ===
- Spring, 1608 – An uneasy alliance concluded with Powhatan in the winter — during which time he saved the colonists from starvation by sending them regular supplies of corn — begins to fall apart, when the colonial militia are seen to conducting military drills outside their fort in the Spring. Paspahegh harassment and filching tools at the fort then resumes, though eight of them are taken prisoner; the Paspahegh responded by taking two colonists who wandered outside the fort as their own prisoners. The same night, the colonists escalated hostilities, raiding and burning the nearby Paspahegh villages. At this, Wowinchopunk released the two captives, but the colonists only released one Paspahegh, keeping the rest until Powhatan sent a gift of corn along with his own young daughter, Pocahontas, to plead for their return.
- Fall, 1608 – Again faced with starvation, the colonists attempt to purchase corn from their Indian neighbours, but find them less willing to sell. They were antagonized by Captain Newport's mock coronation of Mamanatowick Wahunsunacock as a supposed "vassal" of King James I, and his leading a military expedition to the Monacan country, against Powhatan's wishes. The Paspehegh and most other tribes along the James abandoned their villages and hid when a group of colonists came to buy corn that fall. Only a few Indians were found, whom the colonists forced at gunpoint to sell their corn.

=== 1609 ===
- Spring, 1609 – Harassment by the Paspaheghs and other groups continues at the fort; in one skirmish, John Smith, then President of the colony, captured the weroance, Wowinchapuncke. However, he later escaped at which Smith raided his town, stealing two canoes, and killing six at another town. Wowinchapuncke (through his orator, Ocanindge) later makes peace, but states that if the colonists use further force against him, he will let them starve them next winter. He tells Smith, "We perceive and well knowe you intend to destroy us, that are here to intreat and desire your friendship..."
- Several colonists are boarded in Indian towns in the following truce, but relations remain strained. The truce again falls apart when Smith tries unsuccessfully in the summer to establish more fortifications in the territory of the Nansemond tribe (who lived downriver) and at the location of the original Powhatan tribe, (who lived upriver near what is now Richmond, Virginia). Smith left Virginia in October 1609, but that same month the colonists built an fortification (Fort Algernon) in the territory of the Kecoughtan tribe (near modern Hampton, Virginia).

=== 1610 ===
- May – After a particularly harsh winter in which many colonists died of starvation, those remaining were reduced to skin and bones. They were so desperate for food that they resorted to cannibalism of those who died. Sir Thomas Gates then arrives with more colonists, provisions, and orders from James I to "Christianize" the Indians. Gate's fleet, also widely known in later times as the Third Supply Mission, had left England a year earlier, but become lost in a hurricane. Gates saw the condition of the men and saw that they were in no condition physically or mentally to endure anymore. He instead decided to evacuate the colony, and their fort at Jamestown was abandoned.
- The next day after Gates and the survivors set sail, as they were moving downstream on the James River, they encountered the remainder of yet another English supply fleet. This one was under a newly appointed governor, Lord De la Warr. He disagreed with the effort to abandon the colony, and his fleet joined theirs and returned to the fort at Jamestown under Lord De la Warr's command. Although abandoned only a single day, since the colonists leaving Jamestown had not yet picked up those at the outpost at Fort Algernon nearer to the Atlantic Ocean, the latter, now located in the City of Hampton, can lay claim to the longest "continuously occupied" English-speaking settlement in what later became the state of Virginia.
- July – Lord De la Warr proved harsher and more warlike toward the Indians than any of his predecessors. He first sent Gates to drive off the Kecoughtan from their village on July 9, then gave Powhatan the ultimatum of either returning all captive colonists and their property, or facing war. Powhatan insisted that the colonists either stay in their fort or leave Virginia. Enraged, De la Warr had the hand of a Paspahegh captive cut off and sent him to the Mamanatowick with another ultimatum: Return all captive colonists and their property, or the neighboring villages would be burned. Powhatan did not respond.
- August 9, 1610 – Tired of waiting for a response from Powhatan, De la Warr sent Percy with 70 colonists to attack the Paspahegh capital; they burned the houses and destroyed nearby cornfields. They killed between 65 and 75 Paspahegh during the attack, and captured one of Wowinchapuncke's wives and her children. Returning downstream, Percy's men threw the children overboard, and, in his own words, shot out "their Braynes in the water". They stabbed the queen to death after bringing her to Jamestown.
- The Paspahegh never recovered from this attack, and abandoned their town. The attack, and other colonial attacks on Indian settlements, ignited the First Anglo-Powhatan War.

=== 1611 ===
- February 9 – In a skirmish near the Jamestown fort, Wowinchapuncke is mortally wounded. Soon thereafter, his followers avenge his death by luring several colonists out of the fort and killing them. However, the bulk of the tribes members appear to have merged with the other nations, and they disappear from the historical record at this point. Subsequent use of the word Paspahegh in documents is mainly in reference to their former territory.
- May 21 – Sir Thomas Dale, Lord de la Warr's new replacement, visits the site of the former Paspehegh capital and finds it overgrown with weeds.

== Aftermath ==
The original capital of the Paspahegh nation, present-day Sandy Point in Charles City County, was settled by English colonists in 1617, who called it Smith's Hundred. After 1619, they renamed it Southampton Hundred. St. Mary's Anglican Church was established there prior to the Indian massacre of 1622, a series of surprise attacks on English settlements in Virginia that devastated the colonial population.

== Archaeological site ==
Archaeologists are studying the archaeological site known as Paspahegh or Site 44JC308, near Jamestown, Virginia. It is located 6 miles (9.7 km) above the English fort at Jamestown. First identified in 1983 by surveyors from the College of William and Mary, the site is one of only a few Early Contact period archeological sites in Virginia.

The James River Institute for Archeology (JRIA) conducted collections from a 31-acre (130,000 m^{2}) site when it was threatened with development. More concentrated work was done in an area of 2.1 acres (8,500 m^{2}). The site has remants of houses, mortuary structures, elite's houses, and other village structures and artifacts such as ceramics and copper items.

Analysis of the site showed the rise in copper exchange and followed by a decline. English colonists quickly realized how highly the Powhatan peoples valued copper. As the English brought more copper into the colony over a nearly 20-year period, its value declined, and it never recovered the prestige it held at the time of English arrival. Copper was the most important metal in among Powhatan tribes, where it was a mark in life and death of the social hierarchy. The elite were buried with copper items to secure them passage in the spiritual world.

The English copper trade freed Mamanatowick Powhatan from relations with hostile Monacan and their allies in the west. Similarly, the English hoped to use their colony to free themselves of dependence on other European nations for other goods.

Other Paspahegh villages were located on the south bank of the Chickahominy River and on the north bank of the James River in Charles City County.
