= White Hall (Toano, Virginia) =

Historic house in Virginia, United States

- White Hall (also known as Whitehall Tavern; White Hall Plantation)
- U.S. National Register of Historic Places
- Virginia Landmarks Register
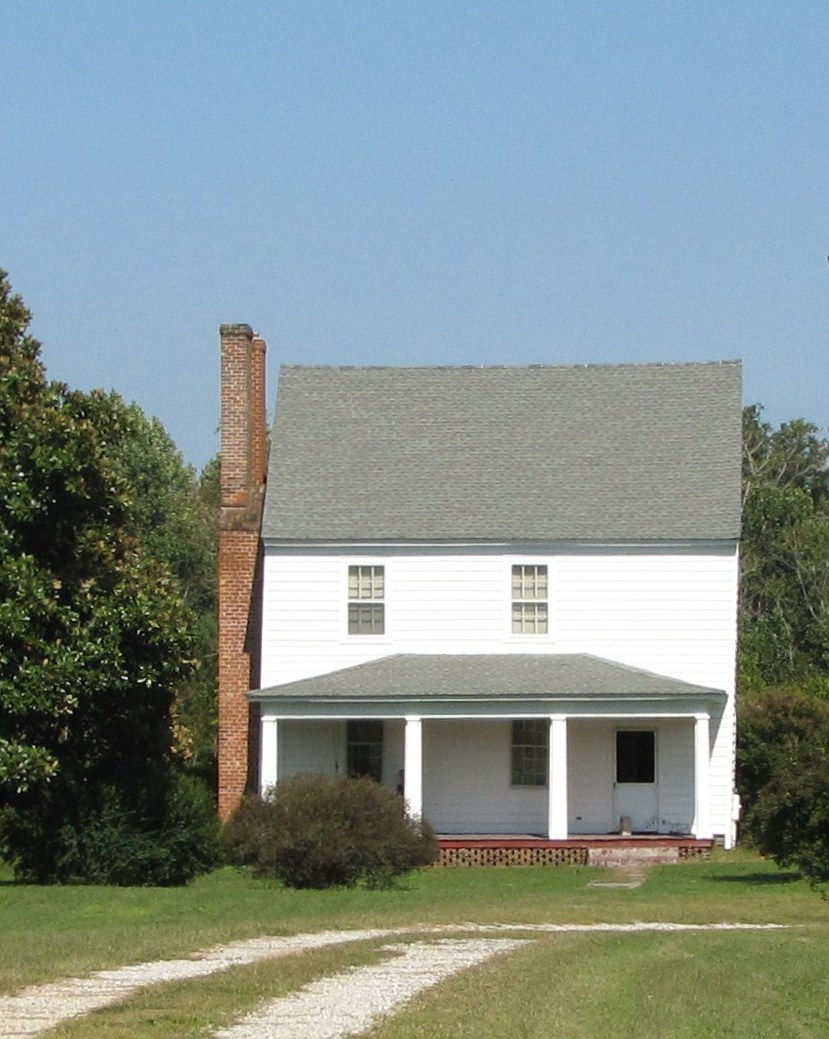
- White Hall in September 2012

- Location within Virginia
- Location: 3200 Rochambeau Rd., Toano, Virginia
- Coordinates: 37°24′6.78″N 76°48′17.35″W
- Area: 42 acres (17 ha)
- Built: 1805; c.1915; c.1935; 1966; 1979
- Architectural style: Federal, Colonial Revival
- NRHP reference No.: 07000234
- VLR No.: 047-0041

Significant dates
- Added to NRHP: March 30, 2007
- Designated VLR: September 6, 2006

White Hall (also known as Whitehall Tavern and White Hall Farm) is a house and former tavern located in Toano, Virginia. It was built in 1805 by William Geddy and is still owned and maintained by the original family. It is listed on the United States National Register of Historic Places.

== History ==
In 1805 William Geddy Sr. along with his son, William, built the structure that is now known as White Hall Tavern on an approximately 326-acre (132 ha) farm. The tavern is located at the intersection of Richmond Road and Old Stage Road in Toano, Virginia, about 15 miles outside of Williamsburg. (Southeastern Virginia Marker W-27). This location was perfect for the tavern, as it served as a rest station on the long journey to Richmond. The property ran between Ware Creek and the main road between Richmond and Williamsburg, and extended to the back of the property of Hickory Neck Episcopal Church.

While the father and son maintained a thriving gunsmith and brass foundry in Williamsburg, they were apparently avid farmers and enjoyed life outside of the hustle and bustle of the city.

There were several structures built in addition to the traditional home: a cooking facility and storage area (located just behind the home) and several farming structures were built. They also installed the trademark brick lined well to provide water to the property.

As of 2012, the original house is still standing along with the cooking and food storage building. Through the centuries, a variety of farming structures have come and gone, but there is still a main barn, a chicken coop, and a garage type structure. The house still contains approximately 95% of its original window glass, and other than installing proper bathrooms, the interior is also in original form. The original structure was built to closely resemble the pre-existing Geddy home located in Colonial Williamsburg. An addition was built years later to accommodate a kitchen (attached to the house) and living quarters for maids. Whereas the original kitchen was located in a separate building behind the original home, as kitchens began to be built as part of homes, the Geddys added their kitchen as a two-story addition to the existing three story main house.

This property was built as a home and business for his son and has continued in the family line for multiple generations. The current owner, Bertrand Edward Geddy, maintains the property and has kept the equine portion of the business going over the past few decades.

The main house contained a dining room, sitting room, and four bedrooms. It is thought that the family used the second floor of the house for their rooms, and the guest rooms were located on the third floor. There was a set of stairs that ran up the entire structure on the right hand side. There was a great hallway with a sitting room and dining room on the left. All of the rooms were large for that time.

Artifacts of all types have been retained and/or discovered on the property. Most of the metal work and the glass work are colonial. Some of the metal work may have been from the family foundry. Various pieces of furniture are still in the family. Bullets, dishes, dolls, and farming equipment have also been preserved. A cattle type barn was built (and is still maintained) and has provided great insight as to the methods used through the years on the property for farming and animal boarding.

It is worth noting that this structure survived all the major battles held in the local area during the American Civil War. While a nearby church sanctuary was completely destroyed, and several other structures, this house was left alone. Various hurricanes have passed through the area and yet the house still stands.

As the property has been passed down through the generations, the farm has been portioned off and sold. The Highway Department came through in the late 1950s and laid down a road, just about through the middle of the farm, which is now Rochambeau Drive. The property on the western side of Rochambeau Drive was sold to another local family, and has become a new home development that the farm lends its name to.

The house with a 42-acre (17 ha) parcel was listed on the National Register in 2007.

== Sources ==
- Colonial Williamsburg Foundation. "The Geddy Family"
- Lewis, Sara E. (2009). James City County. Arcadia Publishing. ISBN 0738568503
