= Archeological Site No. 44JC308 =

Archaeological site in Virginia, United States

- U.S. National Register of Historic Places
- Virginia Landmarks Register
- Nearest city: Williamsburg, Virginia
- Area: 20.5 acres (8.3 ha)
- NRHP reference No.: 93000507
- VLR No.: 047-0098

Significant dates
- Added to NRHP: June 26, 1993
- Designated VLR: April 21, 1993

The Archeological Site No. 44JC308 is a historic archaeological site located near Williamsburg, Virginia. The site encompasses a Paspahegh Native American Village (44JC308) that is currently occupied by the Two Rivers Country Club 18th fairway and green. Archeological findings suggest that the Paspahegh village was established sometime after 1500 AD and occupied during the period of sustained contact between Europeans and native peoples following the establishment of the English settlement at Jamestown in 1607.

First identified in 1983 by surveyors from the College of William and Mary, it is one of only a few archeological sites in the state that date to the Early Contact Period. It is located 6 miles (9.7 km) above the English fort at Jamestown. The James River Institute for Archeology (JRIA) conducted collections from a 31-acre (130,000 m^{2}) site when it was threatened with development. More concentrated work was done in an area of 2.1 acres (8,500 m^{2}). The site has remains of houses, mortuary structures, kings houses, and other elements of the village, including ceramics and copper items.

It was listed on the National Register of Historic Places in 1993.
