= York River State Park =

State park in Virginia, United States

- Croaker Landing Archaeological Site (44JC70)
- U.S. National Register of Historic Places
- Virginia Landmarks Register
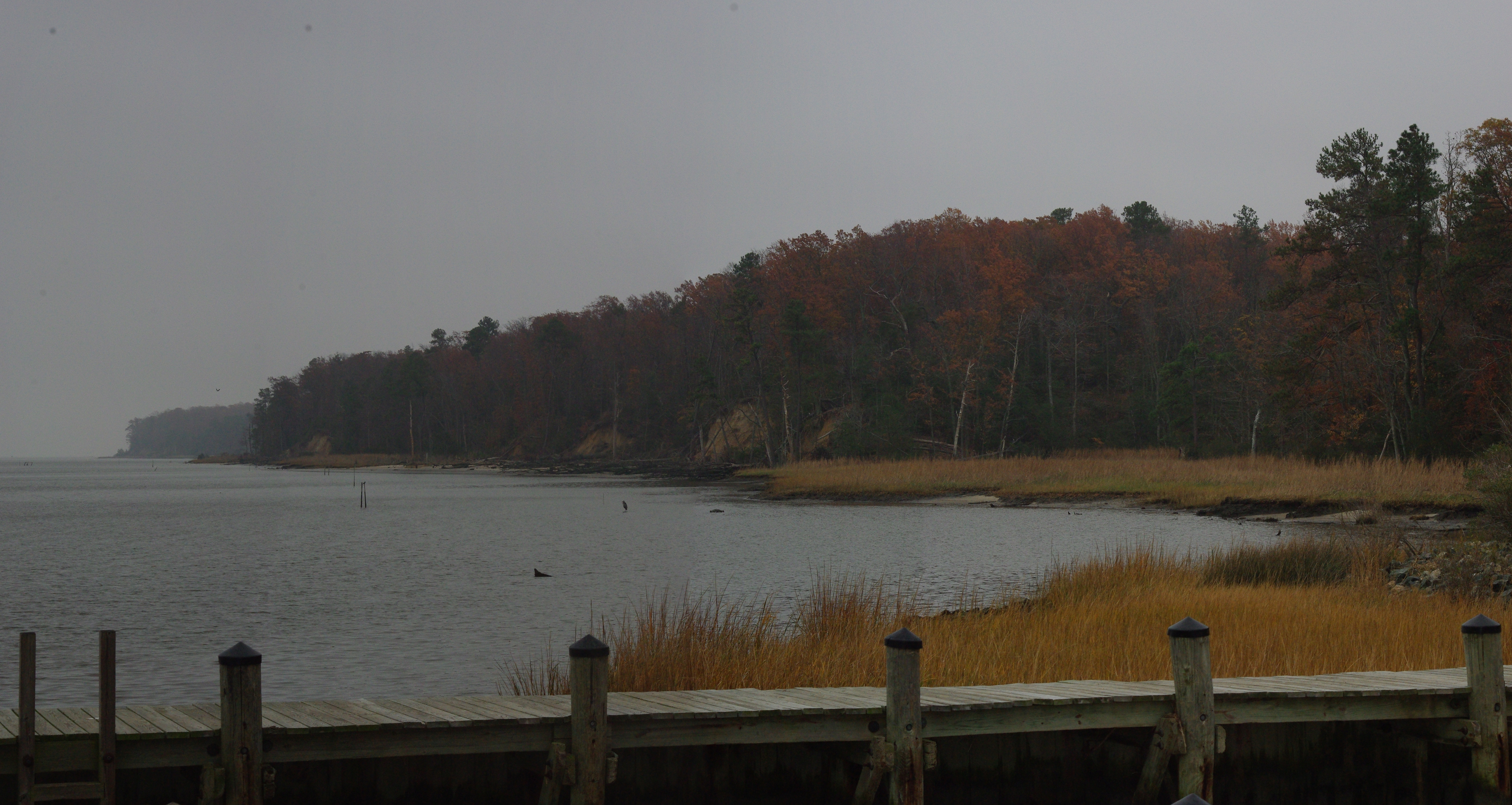
- Panorama of Croaker Landing, taken in 2011

- Location within Virginia Location within the United States
- Nearest city: Croaker, Virginia
- Coordinates: 37°24′19″N 76°42′50″W
- Area: 2,954 acres (1,195 ha)
- NRHP reference No.: 87000753
- VLR No.: 047-0093

Significant dates
- Added to NRHP: 14 May 1987
- Designated VLR: March 17, 1987

York River State Park is located near the unincorporated town of Croaker in James City County, Virginia on the south bank of the York River about 10 miles downstream from West Point.

The York River is formed from the confluence of the Mattaponi River and the Pamunkey River at West Point. The York River empties into the Chesapeake Bay about 30 miles downstream from Croaker Landing.

In the state park, the historical Croaker Landing is an archaeological site listed in the National Register of Historic Places since 1987. The name "Croaker" is believed to have derived from the abundant quantity of Atlantic croaker (Micropogonias undulatus), an inshore, bottom-dwelling fish found in the Chesapeake Bay at the mouth of the York River. The site contains evidence of Native American habitation throughout the Woodland period (c. 1000 B.C. - A.D. 1600). It was listed on the National Register of Historic Places in 1987.

The town of Croaker was known in its early history as Taskinas Plantation. It was the site of a 17th and 18th century public tobacco warehouse where local planters stored their crops to be shipped to England.

York River State Park opened in 1980. It is accessed via Exit 231-B of Interstate 64, which is signed "Croaker-Norge." The old Richmond-Williamsburg Stage Road, now U.S. Route 60, also is nearby.

== See also ==
- List of Virginia state parks
- List of Virginia state forests
