= Hickory Neck Church =

Historic church in Virginia, US

- U.S. National Register of Historic Places
- Virginia Landmarks Register
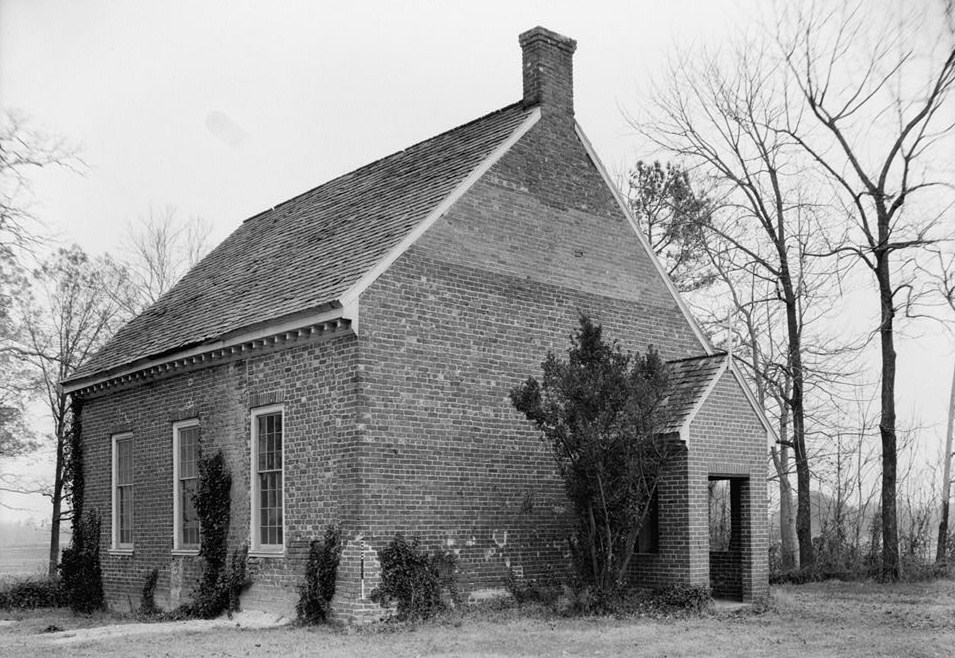
- Hickory Neck Church, HABS Photo

- Location within Virginia Location within the United States
- Location: N of Toano on U.S. 60, near Toano, Virginia
- Coordinates: 37°23′35″N 76°48′16″W
- Area: 9.9 acres (4.0 ha)
- Built: c. 1733–1738, 1773–1774, c. 1825
- Architectural style: Colonial
- NRHP reference No.: 73002023
- VLR No.: 047-0008

Significant dates
- Added to NRHP: July 2, 1973
- Designated VLR: November 9, 1972

Hickory Neck Church is a historic Episcopal church located just outside Toano, James City County, Virginia. The original section was built between 1733 and 1738, with an extension made to the main body of the church in 1773–1774. It was altered about 1825. It is a one-story, three bay deep, rectangular brick structure, measuring 36 feet, 6 inches, long by 28 feet, 6 inches, wide.

It was listed on the National Register of Historic Places in 1973.

The congregation dedicated a new, larger church building on the same campus in 2006. It features a pipe organ built by Jesse Woodberry for a Catholic church in New England which was purchased in 1983 by Old Donation Church in Virginia Beach. Extensive rebuilding took place at that time. It was donated to Hickory Neck in 2005 and additional ranks of pipes added.
