= Diascund Creek =

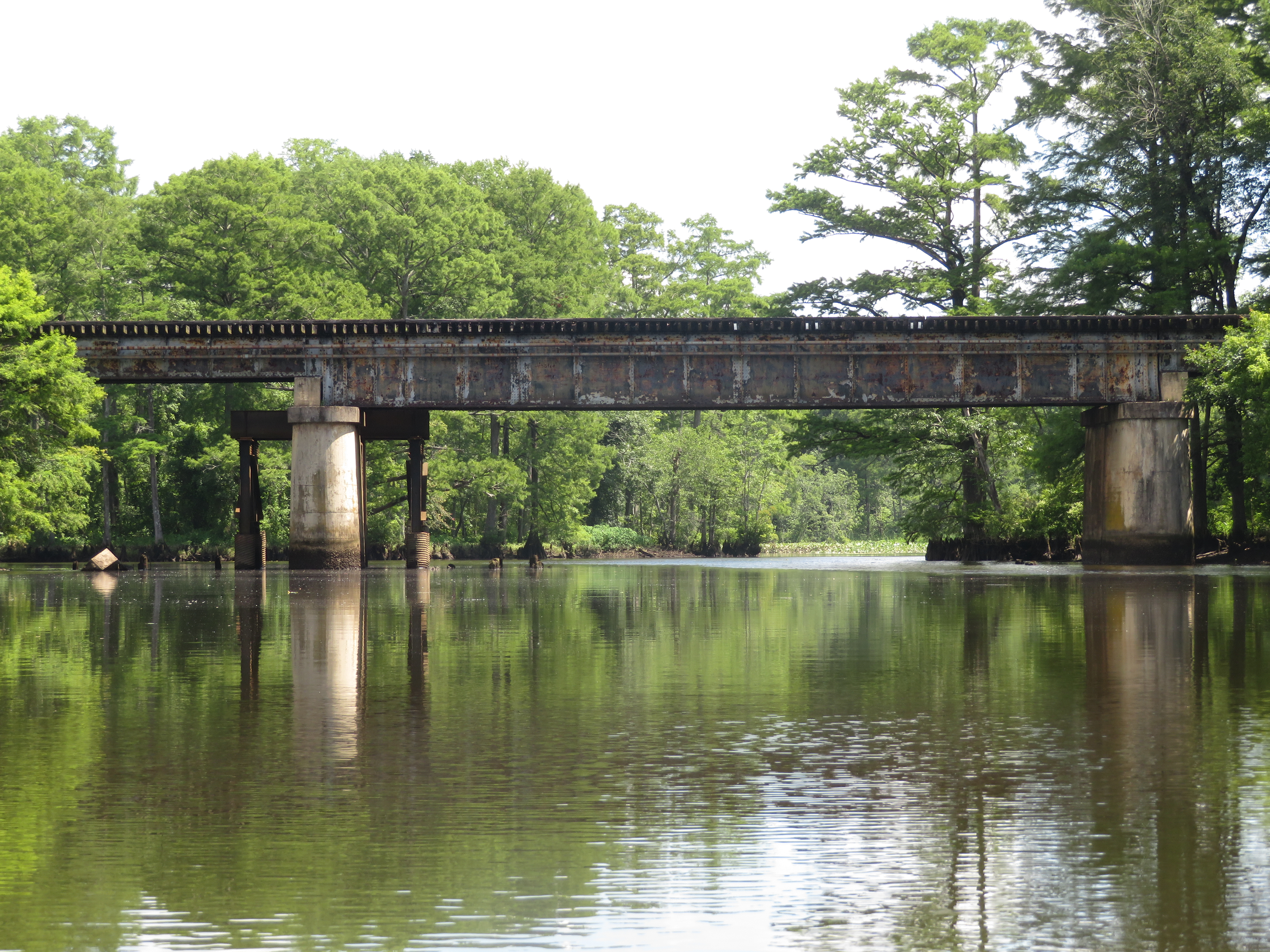
- Diascund Creek south of Lanexa

Location
- Country: United States
- State: Virginia

Physical characteristics
- Mouth: Chickahominy River
  - coordinates: 37°22′49″N 76°54′12″W

Basin features
- River system: James River
- Tributaries
  - left: Mill Creek

Diascund Creek is the major tributary of the Chickahominy River in Virginia, part of the Chesapeake Bay watershed. The creek flows south and forms the border between New Kent County on the west and James City County on the east.

In 1963, an earthen dam was constructed across the creek above Lanexa to create a 1,100 acre reservoir for Newport News Waterworks. The only public access directly to the creek is from Diascund Reservoir Park part of James City County's park system. There are also access points for members of local civic associations on both sides of the tidal creek.

Since at least colonial times, the creek has been bridged at Lanexa where U.S. Route 60 crosses it. During the Revolutionary War British troops destroyed American naval supplies which were stored there on the night of April 22, 1781.

In 1881, the Chesapeake and Ohio Railway bridged the creek further downstream as part of its Peninsula Extension. A bridge crossed the major channel to Hicks Island and a causeway connected the island to the eastern bank. The Diascund station was built just to the east. The Lanexa station was to the west.

In the 1960s and 1970s, the subdivisions of The Colonies and Cypress Point were developed on the lower, tidal, section of the creek adjoining the Chickahominy River. Motor boating and waterskiing are popular on this section of the creek. Waterfront homes and erosion caused by the wake of the motor boats have altered the creek's shoreline and adjoining marsh lands. This effect was aggravated by the growth of hydrilla and other invasive submerged aquatic vegetation. Carp were introduced into the reservoir in 2013 to combat the invasive weed. This has led to a dramatic decline in the hydrilla, both in the reservoir and in the tidal creek, but native marsh plants have not taken its place.

== See also ==
- List of Virginia rivers
