= Windsor Castle (Toano, Virginia) =

Historic house in Virginia, United States

- U.S. National Register of Historic Places
- Virginia Landmarks Register
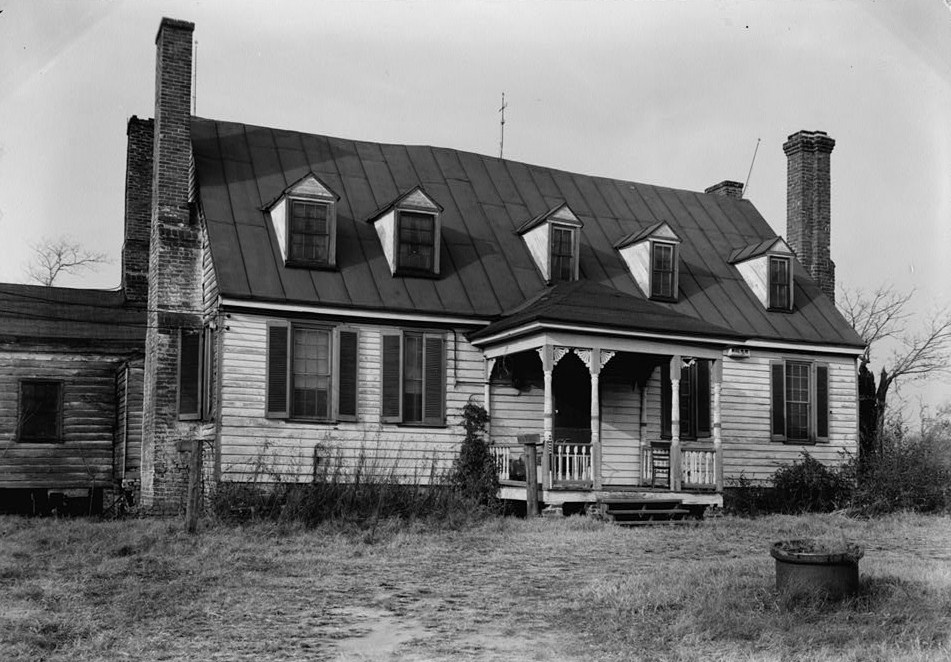
- Windsor Castle, HABS Photo

- Location within Virginia Location within the United States
- Location: 1812 Forge Rd., near Toano, Virginia
- Coordinates: 37°22′38″N 76°51′14″W
- Area: 50 acres (20 ha)
- Built: c. 1760
- NRHP reference No.: 87002149
- VLR No.: 047-0021

Significant dates
- Added to NRHP: December 14, 1987
- Designated VLR: July 21, 1987

Windsor Castle, also known as Windsor, is one of the few 18th century vernacular homes and associated farms that remain in agricultural use. Located about 3 miles from near Toano, James City County, Virginia, the original part of the house dates to about 1760, and is a 1 1/2-story, side passage plan frame dwelling. In the late-18th or early-19th century, it was expanded and transformed into a central passage plan.

== History ==
In 1810 the house and 50 acre farm were part of the estate of William Browne, and by 1832 was owned by John R. Pierce. From 1840 until the American Civil War, its owner was CSA Captain William Bush (1810-1862), who lived with his wife Malinda Elizabeth Finch Bush (1811-1862) and ten children. A descendant of daughter Trittie Bush, David Warren Ware, renovated the property in the late 1960s and obtained its historic certification.

== Architecture ==
It features two exterior chimneys and a gable roof with dormers, and sits on a brick foundation. The interior has an original closed-string stair and built-in corner cupboard. It was listed on the National Register of Historic Places in 1987.
