= Toano, Virginia =

Unincorporated community in Virginia, United States

- Unincorporated community
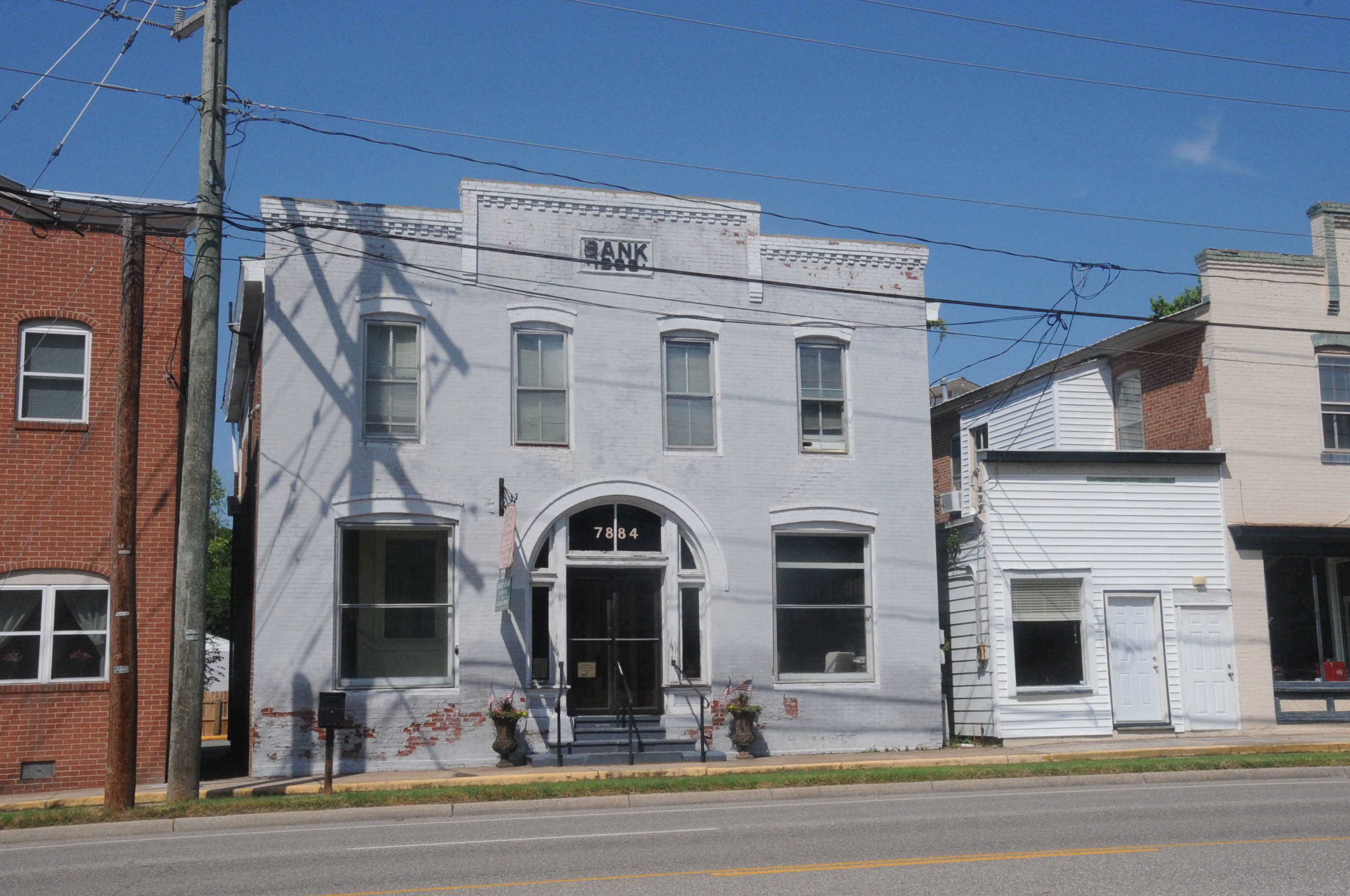
- Former bank in the Toano Historic District

- Location within Virginia Location within the United States
- Coordinates: 37°22′48″N 76°48′15″W
- Country: United States
- State: Virginia
- County: James City
- Time zone: UTC−05:00 (Eastern (EST))
  - Summer (DST): UTC−04:00 (EDT)
- ZIP Codes: 23168

Toano, formerly Burnt Ordinary, is an unincorporated community in James City County, Virginia, United States. It is in Virginia’s 1st Congressional District.

== History ==
Toano was established in the late 19th century in western James City County at the former site of "Burnt Ordinary", which was named in the 18th century for a roadside tavern that had burned down. In 1881, the Peninsula Extension of the Chesapeake and Ohio Railway (C&O) was built through the area from Richmond to reach the coal piers on Hampton Roads at the new city of Newport News. The C&O built a railroad station at Burnt Ordinary and renamed it Toano from the Paiute word meaning "high ground".

Toano was located on the old Richmond-Williamsburg Stage Road, which is U.S. Route 60 in modern times. Interstate 64 was built through the area in the 1970s, and passes nearby. Exit 227, located at the intersection of State Route 30, is signed "Toano-West Point".

Toano is close to major Historic Triangle attractions such as Colonial Williamsburg, and the Busch Gardens Williamsburg and Water Country USA theme parks. Smaller attractions at Lakewood Trails and Go-Karts Plus are also located nearby.

Toano's history is recalled on a Virginia Historical Marker nearby, which reads:

First called John Lewis's Ordinary and then Fox's, Burnt Ordinary received its name in Jan. 1780 when, according to Virginia Gazette, Fox's Ordinary burned to the ground. Later, in Oct. 1781, when the French army's wagon train passed by, Alexander Berthier wrote that "two old chimneys" stood here in the fork of the road. Also in 1781, Samuel DeWitt, George Washington's cartographer, noted the site of the "Burnt Brick Ordinary" on one of his maps. Elements of Lafayette's army camped two miles south of here at Chickahominy Church after the Battle of Green Spring on 6 July 1781.

Places in or near Toano that are listed on the National Register of Historic Places include: Chickahominy Shipyard Archeological Site, Hickory Neck Church, Stone House Site, White Hall and Windsor Castle.

A local landmark is a 7-foot (2.1 m) waving tiger statue in front of a service station that used to be owned by Exxon at Anderson's Corner. In 1990, the oil company attempted to replace it as it no longer conformed to the company's specifications. The town rallied to save it, and the company allowed it to stay. A few businesses have adopted the tiger moniker, and the landmark inspired the tiger mascot for the Toano Middle School.

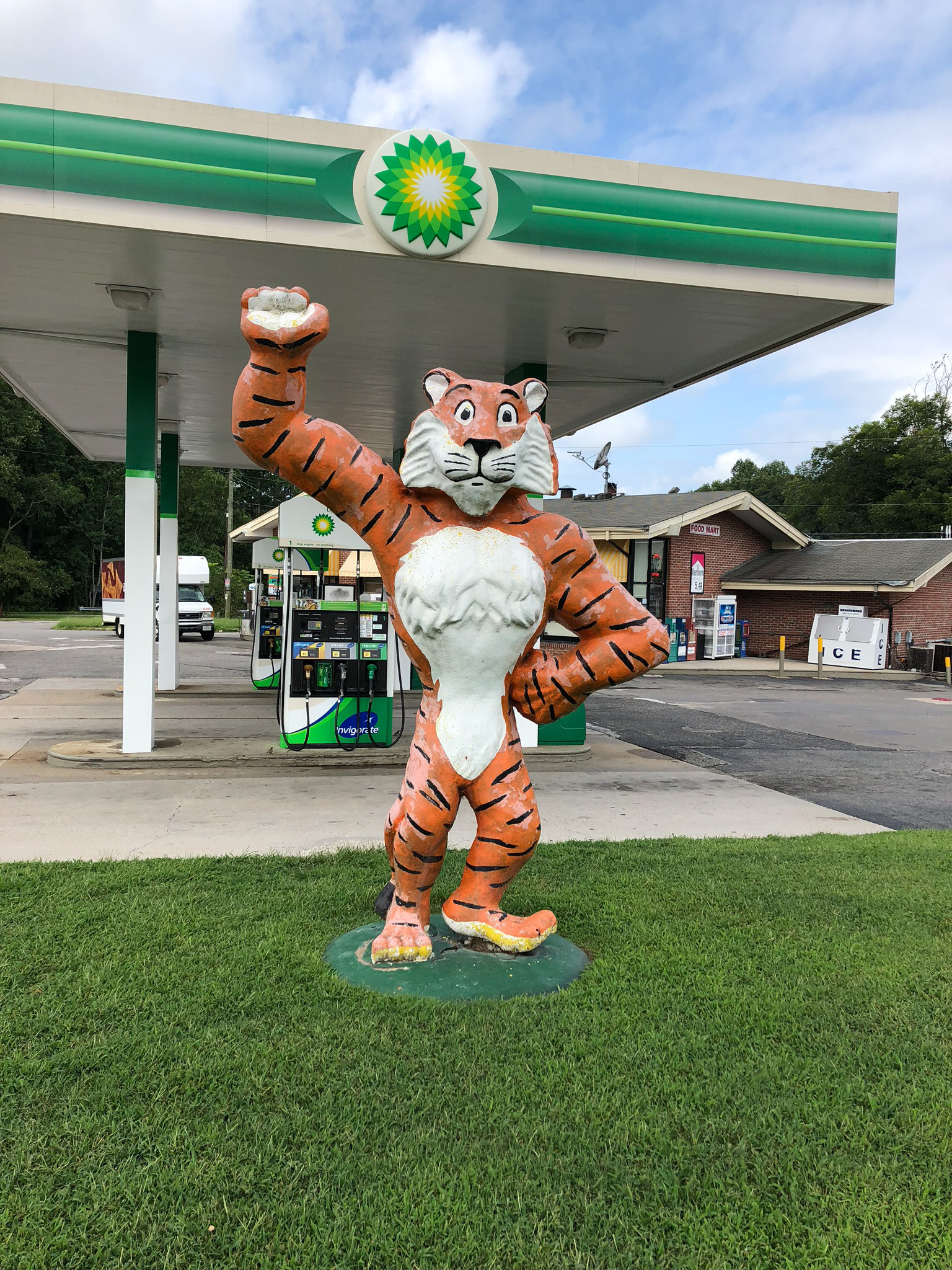
Tiger at Anderson's Corner in Toano.

Houses of worship in or near Toano include Hickory Neck Episcopal Church, which traces its roots to 1734, and Mt. Vernon United Methodist Church, which dates to 1887.
