= Chickahominy River =

Coordinates: 37°14′1″N 76°53′23″W

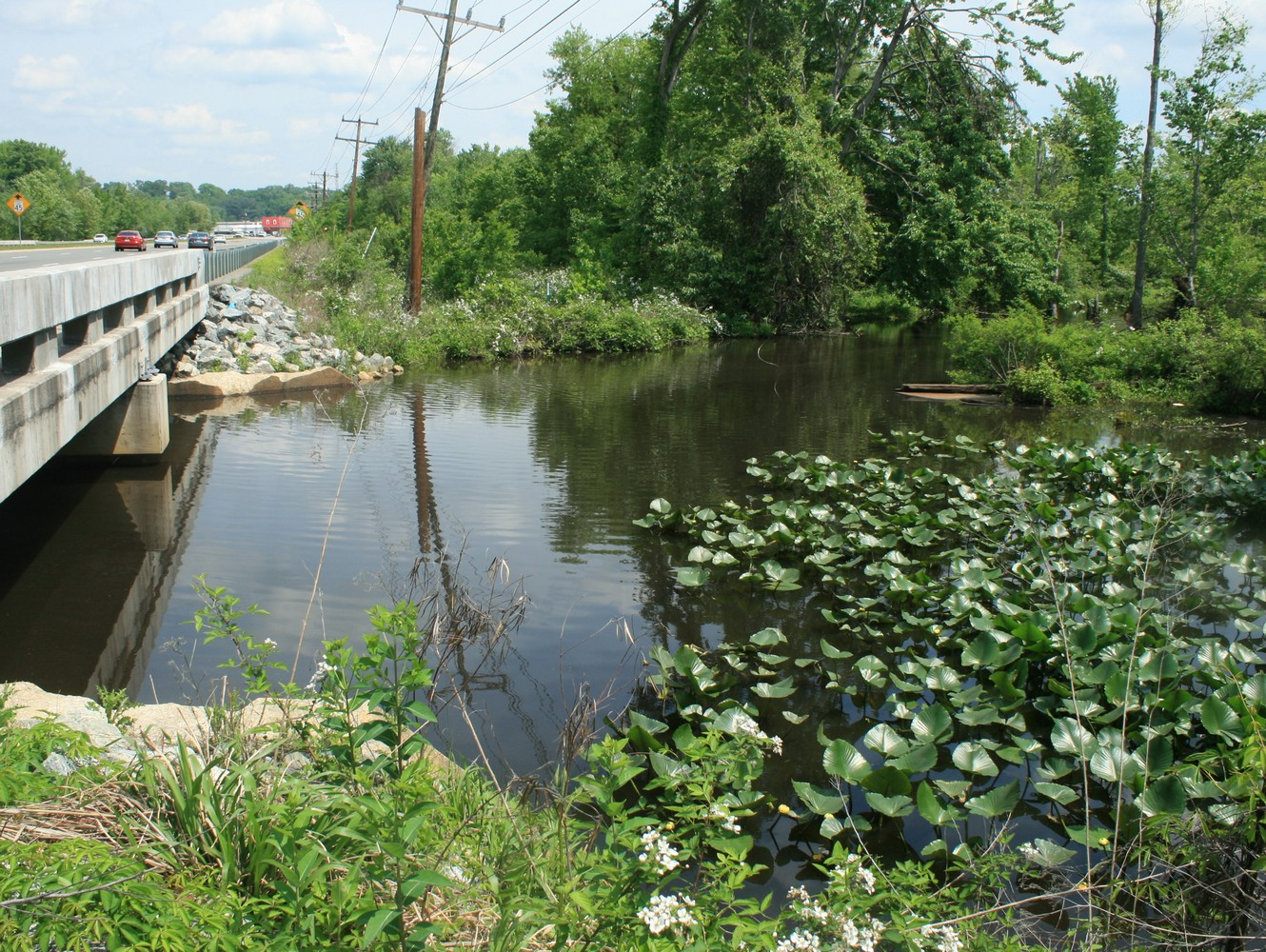
- Chickahominy near Mechanicsville, Virginia

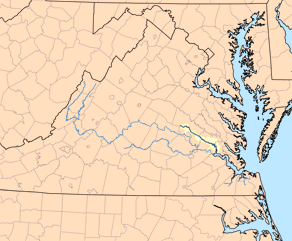
- Map of the James River watershed with the Chickahominy highlighted
- Etymology: Chickahominy people

Location
- Country: United States
- State: Virginia

Physical characteristics
- Mouth
  - location: James River

Basin features
- Tributaries
  - left: Diascund Creek

The Chickahominy is an 87-mile-long (140 km) river in eastern Virginia. The river, which serves as the eastern border of Charles City County, rises about 15 miles (24 km) northwest of Richmond and flows southeast and south to the James River. The river was named after the Chickahominy Indian tribe who lived near the river when the English colonists arrived in 1607. Chickahominy descendants live in Charles City County today.

During the American Civil War (1861–65), the upper reaches of the river became a major obstacle to Union General George B. McClellan's Peninsula campaign, a failed attempt in 1862 to capture the Confederate capital of Richmond. Docile, narrow, and relatively easily crossed during dry weather, after periods of rain, the river expands across a flood plain with swamps as much as a mile across. The Chickahominy was in flood stage and divided the Union Army during crucial periods, despite continuous efforts by the United States Army Corps of Engineers to build and maintain bridges. Other battles were fought nearby in 1864.

Part of a popular recreational area for boating, waterskiing, and sport fishing, featuring Walkers Dam and Chickahominy Lake, the lower Chickahominy River has become a major source of drinking water for the lower portion of the Virginia Peninsula in modern times. It also serves as a border for the Chickahominy Wildlife Management Area.

== Geologic definition ==
The Chickahominy River is a Coastal Plain tributary to the James River with headwaters northwest of Richmond. For its first 15 miles (24 km), the Chickahominy flows over igneous and metamorphic bedrock of the Piedmont, but soon becomes a Coastal Plain stream near Mechanicsville. The low-gradient Chickahominy sluggishly flows through broad swampy lowlands for 40 miles (64 km) from Henrico County to eastern New Kent County. 4 miles (6.4 km) southeast of Providence Forge, the Chickahominy River becomes an estuary and makes a turn towards to the south.

When the sea level was higher during warmer (non-glacial) periods in the Pleistocene, the Chickahominy was a much broader river. The ancient riverbanks and meander loops are still recognizable. As sea level rose after the last glacial interval (during the last 20,000 years), the Chickahominy has also risen, causing old flood plains and valleys to be backfilled as marshes.

== History ==
In 1607, Captain John Smith, one of the Jamestown settlers, traveled with others up the Chickahominy in the hope that it would prove to be a passage to the Pacific Ocean. Smith was captured by warriors of the Chickahominy tribe and taken to meet Chief Powhatan. According to legend, he was rescued by Powhatan's daughter, Matoaka (Pocahontas).

In the 19th century, the Chickahominy River was bordered in many places by swampy forests, which during heavy rains and spring thaw were so covered with water as to be almost impassable. At such times, the river's normally narrow path could expand to be as much as a mile wide. This small river became a major obstacle and natural force to be dealt with during the American Civil War (1861–1865).

=== 1862: Peninsula Campaign ===
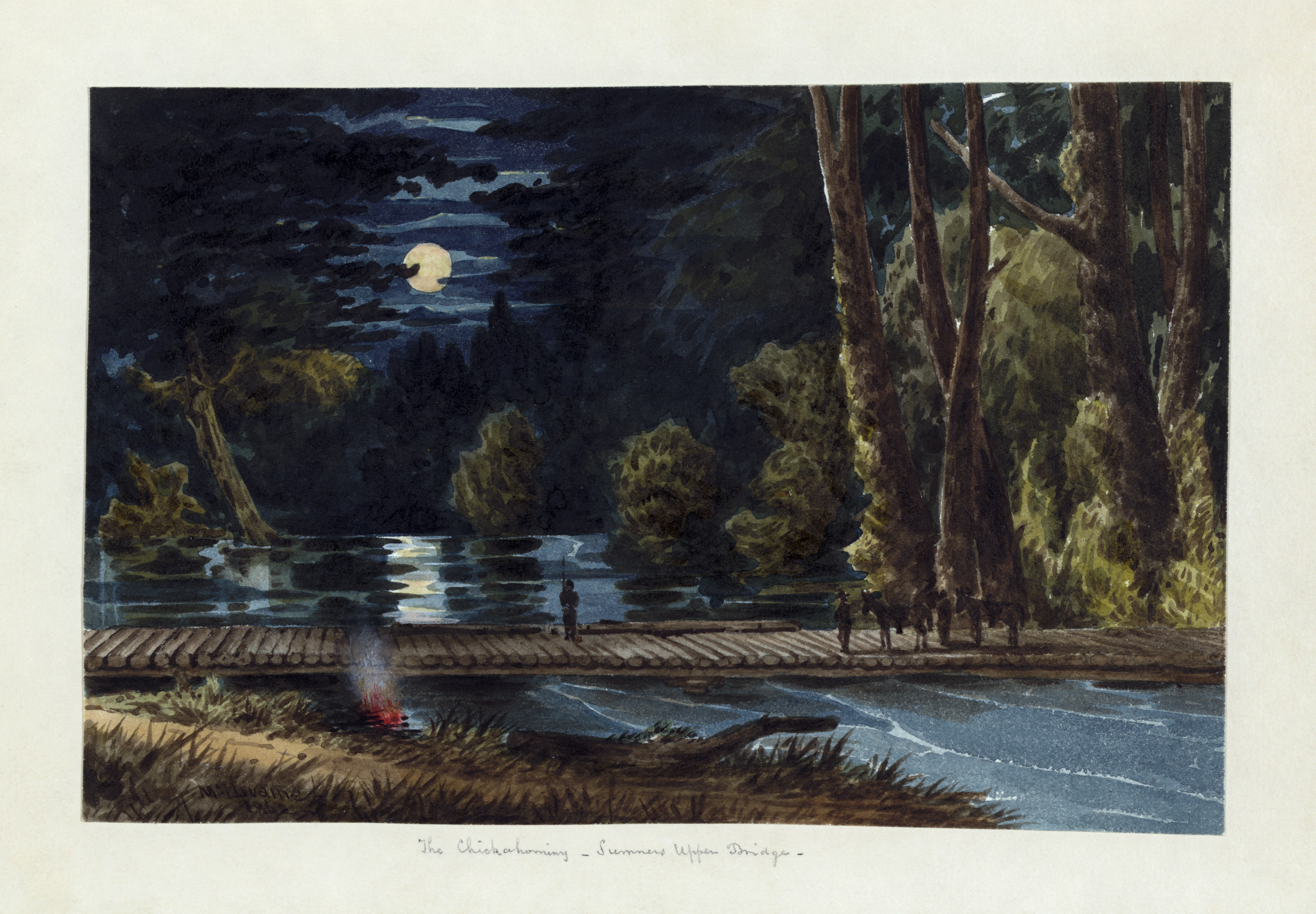
The Chickahominy - Sumner's Upper Bridge: 1862 watercolour by William McIlvaine.

In the spring and summer of 1862, during the Peninsula Campaign, General George B. McClellan pushed a Union force up the Virginia Peninsula from Fort Monroe at the mouth of Hampton Roads in an attempt to capture the Confederate capital of Richmond. After McClellan's troops had taken Yorktown on the York River, his army followed the retreating Confederates, and gained another victory over them on May 5, 1862, at Williamsburg, the old colonial capital, which was located on high ground between the York and James Rivers about ten miles (16 km) below the mouth of the Chickahominy. The Confederates retreated northwest and crossed the Chickahominy near the point where New Kent, Henrico, and Hanover counties border each other, in modern times known as Bottoms Bridge. A portion of the Union army followed them, while other portions remained east of the river.

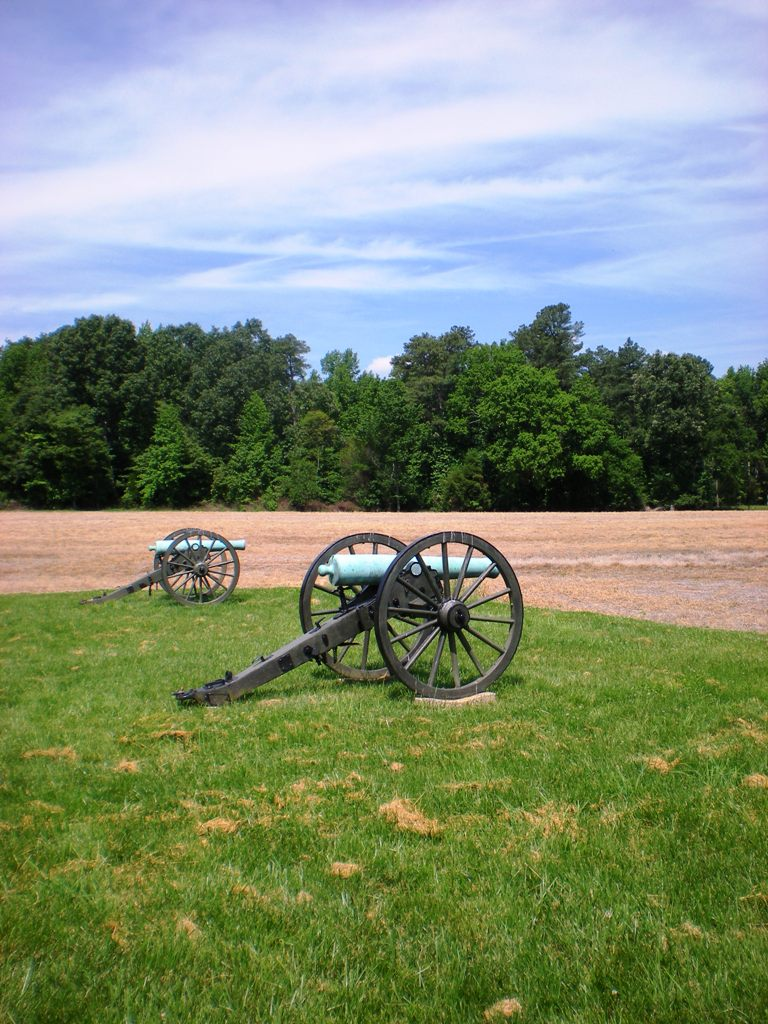
Cannons that were used at the Battle of Malvern Hill on the preserved battlefield there.

Not long after the Union forces were aligned on either side of the apparently docile Chickahominy River, a period of heavy rains came on and the river and swamps were so flooded that they became almost completely impassable. The Union army was thus cut in two; for though the two halves were only a short distance apart, their only means of reaching each other was by a bridge many miles away.

General Joseph E. Johnston, who commanded the Confederate Army of Northern Virginia, resolved to attack the two (of five) corps that were south of the river and destroy them before the rest of the army could come to their aid. The attack was made in two places, at the railroad station of Fair Oaks and (about a mile away) at the crossroads of Seven Pines. (The battle is often referred to in the North as the Battle of Seven Pines; the South calls it the Battle of Fair Oaks.) At first the Union troops were driven back and almost beaten, but meanwhile the soldiers on the other side of the Chickahominy had succeeded in building a bridge. Several thousand Union men hurried across to help, driving the Confederates back. General Johnston was severely wounded (May 31). The next day the attack was renewed at Fair Oaks, but the Confederates were again defeated and they retreated in disorder to Richmond.

It is surmised that if General McClellan had followed them into Richmond, he would have probably taken the city. Instead, he advanced slowly and cautiously, thinking the Confederate forces there were much larger. The slow advance gave the Confederates time to build forts and to receive reinforcements. In a few weeks, the Confederates had nearly as many men as the Federals, and their army was now commanded by General Robert E. Lee.

General McClellan up to this time had received his provisions and supplies by the way of the York River, and his base (that is, the place where his provisions were landed) was at White House on the Pamunkey River. He also heavily depended upon the recently completed Richmond and York River Railroad to supply his forces.

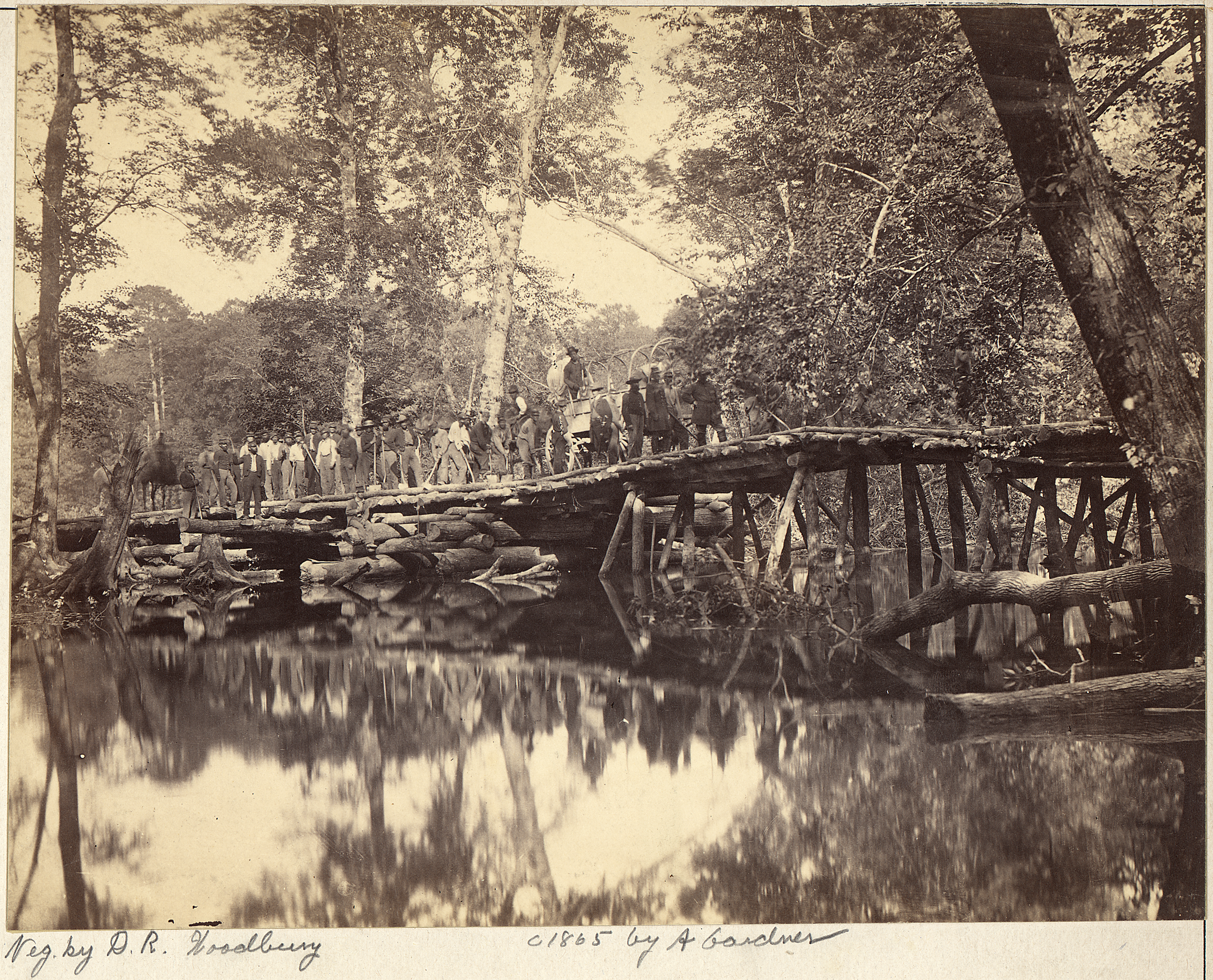
Military bridge across Chickahominy

General Lee's army recrossed the Chickahominy southwest of Mechanicsville, trying to get between the Union army and White House and prevent the Union army from gaining provisions. Instead of trying to prevent this, General McClellan resolved to change his base to Harrison's Landing or City Point on the James River, about 30 miles (48 km) east of Richmond. To do this, he had to unite his army on the west side of the Chickahominy and march toward City Point.

The Confederates had already attacked the Union Army at Mechanicsville on the east side of the river, but after the bloody battle they were driven back (June 26). A still more bloody battle was fought on the next day at the Battle of Gaines' Mill, 5 miles (8.0 km) from Mechanicsville near a crossroads called Cold Harbor. There General McClellan had left a rear-guard under General Fitz John Porter, while the rest of the army crossed the river. But the rear-guard was attacked so fiercely that many thousands recrossed the river to help it, and even then it was hardly saved from a terrible defeat. At night the rear-guard crossed the river, and the whole army was united on the west side (the side nearest to Richmond).

They might easily have taken most of the city, for General Lee and most of his army were still on the east side of the Chickahominy, and farther away from Richmond than McClellan was. But McClellan still supposed that a large army was defending the city, and they began to retreat towards City Point, fighting as they went. At Savage's Station, east of Fair Oaks, they had a large hospital and many military stores. The stores were burned and a train of cars loaded with bombshells was set on fire; at the same time the engine was started, and as the train rushed off the shells exploded, until the cars reached a broken bridge, where they plunged into the river. Soon after the Confederates attacked the Federals at the station and drove them away, capturing the hospital with 2,500 wounded soldiers (June 29).

On the next day they made another fierce attack at Frayser's Farm, where a bloody battle was fought without much advantage being gained on either side. Finally (July 1) almost the whole Confederate army attacked the Union army at Malvern Hill, but they were beaten back with terrible slaughter and the Union army reached Harrison's Landing in safety.

The battles fought by Lee against McClellan from June 25 to July 1, 1862, are often called the Seven Days Battles. The Union loss during this time was 15,200; the Confederate loss, 19,400.

=== 1864: Overland Campaign ===
On June 3, 1864, a second battle was fought at Cold Harbor, between Union army under General Ulysses S. Grant and the Confederates under General Lee. The Confederates had much the smaller army, but they were in strong entrenchments, where the Union army attacked them. After one of the bloodiest battles of the war, the Unionists were driven back, leaving the ground covered with dead and wounded.

== Walkers Dam ==
About 22 miles (35 km) upstream from the confluence with the James River is Walkers Dam. Its construction resulted in the creation of the 1,200-acre (4.9 km^{2}) Chickahominy Lake.

Walkers Dam was built in 1943 during World War II by the U.S. War Department to ensure an adequate water supply for the Newport News Shipbuilding and Drydock Company and other military operations on the lower peninsula.

It is now owned by Newport News Waterworks, a regional water utility that serves more than 400,000 customers in Hampton, Newport News, Poquoson, and parts of York and James City counties. The waterworks now also operates dams and reservoirs on two tributaries of the Chickahominy as well: Diascund Creek and Little Creek. The Chickahominy River is the utility's primary water source.

== Crossing of Rt. 5 near mouth ==
Near the mouth of the river and its confluence with the James River, State Route 5 crosses the river on the Judith Stewart Dresser Bridge, a fixed-span bridge between Charles City County and James City County built in 2009. It replaced a swing-span movable bridge that was built in 1939. The new $33.6 million fixed-span began construction in 2007 and opened on January 24, 2009. Located just west of the previous structure, it rises to a height of 52 feet (16 m) and includes a separate pathway for the Virginia Capital Trail.

The clearance for recreational boats used to be 12 feet (3.7 m) when the bridge was in the closed position. Vehicles on the highway were also limited by a 13'11" clearance restriction. The bridge was built on wood pilings and became increasingly troublesome mechanically and expensive to maintain as it aged.

== Fishing ==
Fishing is a popular activity along the Chickahominy, both above and below Walkers Dam. Among the most popular are blue catfish, largemouth bass, river herring, striped bass, shad, bowfin and yellow perch.

== Rowing ==
The Rowing Clubs of the College of William and Mary and the Williamsburg Boat Club in nearby Williamsburg and James City County practice on the river.

== See also ==
- List of Virginia rivers
