= Interstate 64 in Virginia =

Highway in Virginia

Interstate 64
- Purple Heart Trail
- I-64 highlighted in red

Route information
- Maintained by VDOT
- Length: 299.45 mi (481.92 km)
- Existed: 1957–present
- NHS: Entire route

Major junctions
- West end: I-64 / US 60 at the West Virginia state line in White Sulphur Springs, WV
- I-81 from near Lexington to Staunton; US 29 near Charlottesville; US 15 in Zion Crossroads; I-295 in Short Pump; I-95 / I-195 / US 1 / US 301 in Richmond; I-295 / US 60 near Richmond; I-664 in Hampton; I-564 / US 460 / SR 165 in Norfolk; I-264 in Norfolk; I-464 / US 17 / SR 168 in Chesapeake
- East end: I-264 / I-664 in Chesapeake

Location
- Country: United States
- State: Virginia
- Counties: Alleghany, City of Covington, Rockbridge, Augusta, City of Waynesboro, Nelson, Albemarle, City of Charlottesville, Fluvanna, Louisa, Goochland, Henrico, City of Richmond, New Kent, James City, York, City of Newport News, City of Hampton, City of Norfolk, City of Virginia Beach, City of Chesapeake

Highway system
- Interstate Highway System; Main; Auxiliary; Suffixed; Business; Future; Virginia Routes; Interstate; US; Primary; Secondary; Byways; History; HOT lanes
← SR 63	→ SR 65

Interstate 64 (I-64) in the US state of Virginia runs east–west through the middle of the state from West Virginia to the Hampton Roads region, for a total of 299 miles (481 km). From the West Virginia state line to Chesapeake, it passes through the major cities of Lexington, Staunton, Charlottesville, the state capital of Richmond, Newport News, Hampton, and Norfolk. It is notable for crossing the mouth of the harbor of Hampton Roads on the Hampton Roads Bridge–Tunnel (HRBT), the first bridge–tunnel to incorporate artificial islands, concurrent with U.S. Route 60 (US 60). Also noteworthy is a section through Rockfish Gap, a wind gap in the Blue Ridge Mountains, which was equipped with an innovative system of airport-style runway lighting embedded into the pavement to aid motorists during periods of poor visibility due to fog or other conditions.

== Route description ==
=== Alleghany County to Charlottesville ===
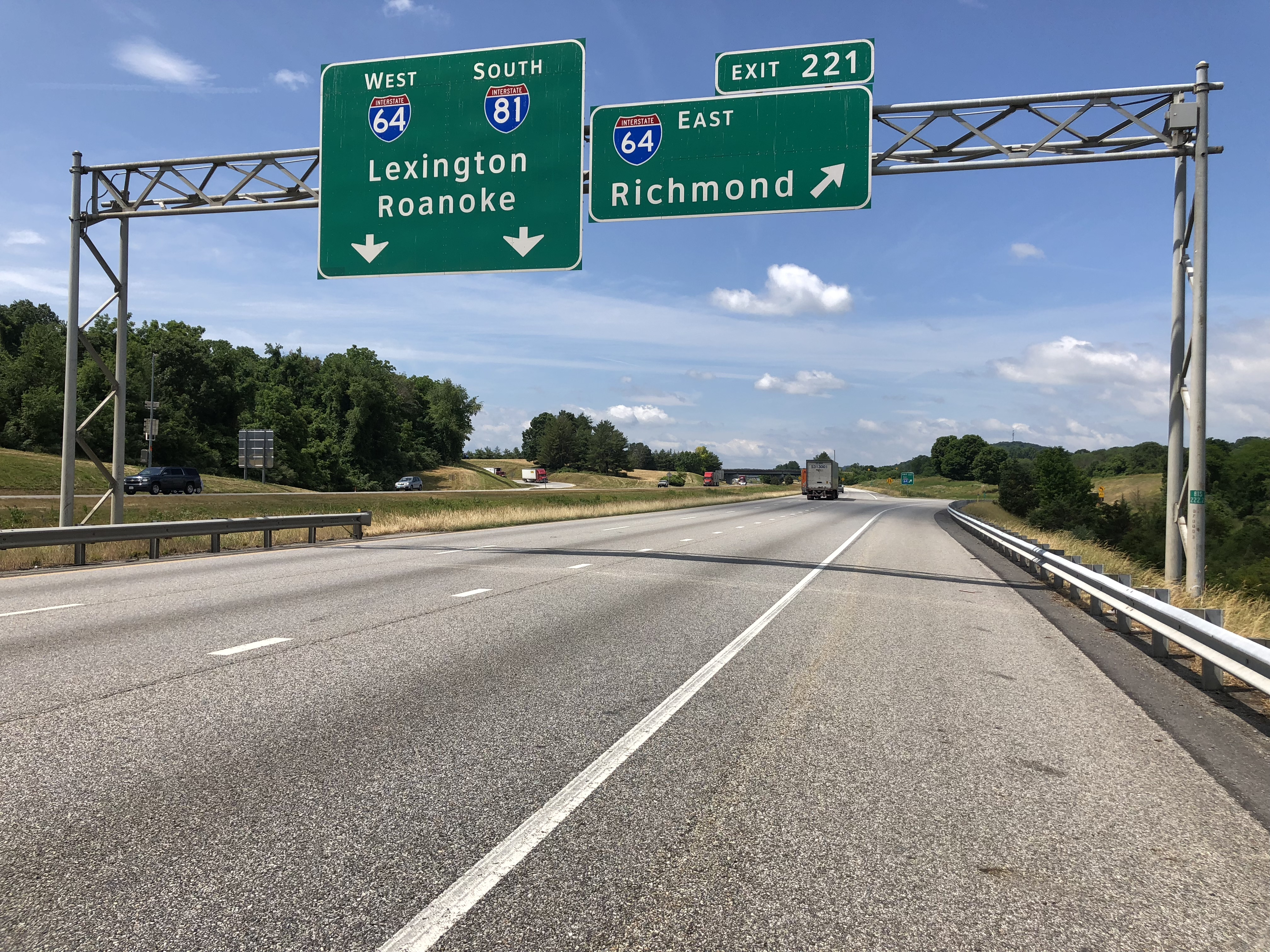
I-64 and I-81 run together in Augusta County.

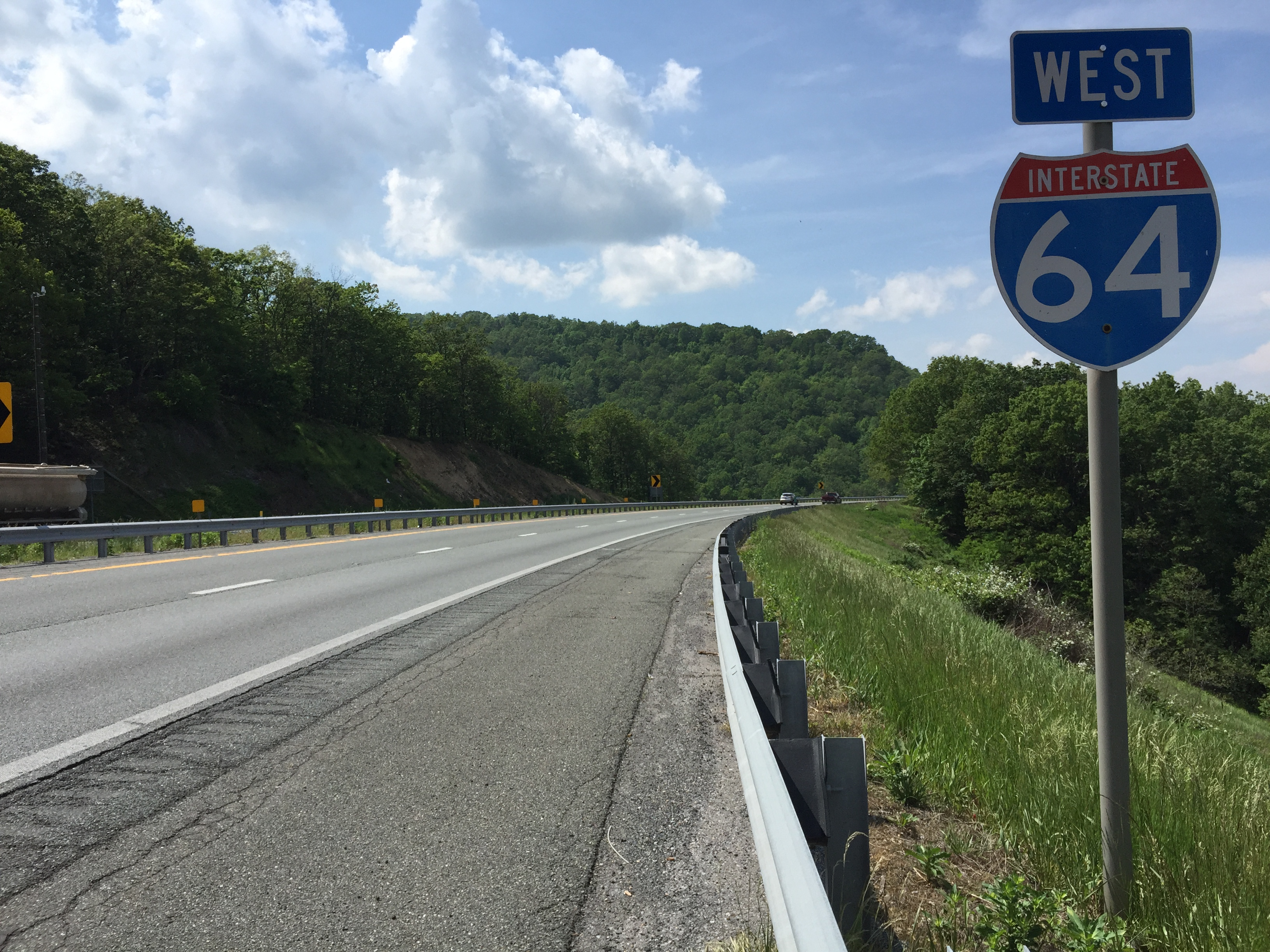
View west along I-64 near Waynesboro

I-64 enters Virginia as a four-lane divided highway, continuing its concurrency with US 60 through Covington into Lexington where the two routes split. From Lexington, I-64 then turns northward to Staunton, overlapping I-81 in the Shenandoah Valley. From Staunton, I-64 leaves I-81, passes through Waynesboro, crosses Rockfish Gap, and continues eastward, passing just to the south of Charlottesville, closely following the path of the historic colonial-era Three Notch'd Road, which had been established in the Colony of Virginia by the 1730s and was largely replaced in the 1930s by US 250. Just outside of Charlottesville in Zion Crossroads, I-64 received the state's first diverging diamond interchange at its interchange with US 15, which opened to traffic on February 21, 2014, and was completed on April 15, 2014.

=== Greater Richmond and the Virginia Peninsula ===
After Charlottesville, I-64 then turns more east-southeasterly and heads toward Richmond, passing through Fluvanna, Goochland, and Louisa counties. After entering Henrico County and the Greater Richmond Region, I-64 interchanges and overlaps with I-95 on a stretch of highway which was a part of the former Richmond–Petersburg Turnpike, passing near Downtown Richmond and through the historic Black neighborhood of Jackson Ward. Once on the south side of Downtown Richmond, I-64 diverges from its concurrency with I-95 and continues southeasterly down the Virginia Peninsula through New Kent County and the Historic Triangle, into Newport News.

This portion of I-64 was set up by the Virginia Department of Transportation (VDOT) with a contraflow lane reversal system in place in the event of a mass evacuation of the Hampton Roads area region due to a hurricane or other catastrophic event. Gates are installed at the eastbound I-64 entrance and exit ramps from exit 200 (I-295) to exit 273 (US 60 east of the HRBT), and crossover roads are in place near the aforementioned exits.

=== Hampton Roads Beltway ===
Map of the Hampton Roads Beltway

The Hampton Roads Bridge–Tunnel

About a mile (1.6 km) before the southern interchange with State Route 199 (SR 199), I-64 becomes a six-lane divided highway as it continues toward Hampton Roads. Shortly after entering its interchange with SR 173 (Denbigh Boulevard), I-64 enters the Hampton Roads metropolitan area and widens out to an eight-lane divided highway, continuing generally south-southeasterly into Hampton where it meets the northern terminus of I-664 beginning the Inner Loop of the Hampton Roads Beltway. I-64 curves north-northeast to pass north of Downtown Hampton and cross the Hampton River, turning back southward to reach the Hampton Roads Bridge–Tunnel, which it utilizes to cross the main shipping channel at the entrance to the harbor of Hampton Roads from the Chesapeake Bay. Once on the Southside, I-64 turns south through Norfolk, passing the eastern boundary of Naval Station Norfolk and Chambers Field and the spur route supplying it, I-564. It then becomes a six-lane divided highway with a two-lane reversible roadway in the middle, which is used for HOV traffic during morning and afternoon rush hours. It continues through Norfolk, curving multiple times and eventually ending up heading due south as it passes the interchange with another of its spur routes, I-264 on the northwest side of Virginia Beach.

After I-264, there are no more directional markers on I-64 from here to its "eastern" terminus because I-64 "east" will actually head west after its current southward course, and vice-versa. From I-264 to its "eastern" terminus, it is simply only signed as I-64 and either the Inner and Outer loop of the Hampton Roads Beltway.

Shortly after the I-264 interchange, I-64 leaves Virginia Beach for the city of Chesapeake. It soon comes to a complex interchange between another of its spur routes, I-464, along with US 17 and SR 168. I-64, now running westward, crosses the Southern Branch Elizabeth River using the High Rise Bridge. The road then curves northwesterly and ends at Bower's Hill, where it meets both the western terminus of I-264 and the southern terminus of I-664 near the northeastern corner of the Great Dismal Swamp. I-64's lanes continue northbound as I-664 to Newport News across the Monitor–Merrimac Memorial Bridge–Tunnel (MMMBT), ending at I-64 in Hampton, completing the beltway.

== History ==
In early studies and proposals of the Interregional Highway System (the predecessor title of the Eisenhower Interstate System), I-64 was to use the US 250 alignment west of Richmond. However, in the late 1950s, a number of interested citizens, including Virginia Senator Mosby Perrow Jr., proposed that I-64 be realigned to run along US 220, US 460, SR 307, and US 360 from Clifton Forge via Cloverdale (near Roanoke), Lynchburg, and Farmville to Richmond. This southern route was favored by Governor J. Lindsay Almond and most members of the State Highway Commission.

The decision was on hold for three years while the state continued planning for the piece of the US 250 alignment from Richmond to Short Pump, which would be needed anyway to handle traffic. In 1961, US Secretary of Commerce Luther H. Hodges rejected that plan and chose the present route, leaving Lynchburg as the largest city in Virginia not served by an Interstate. Officially, the chosen route was considered more efficient. However, there is speculation that the decision involved "back-room" politics of the Kennedy administration.

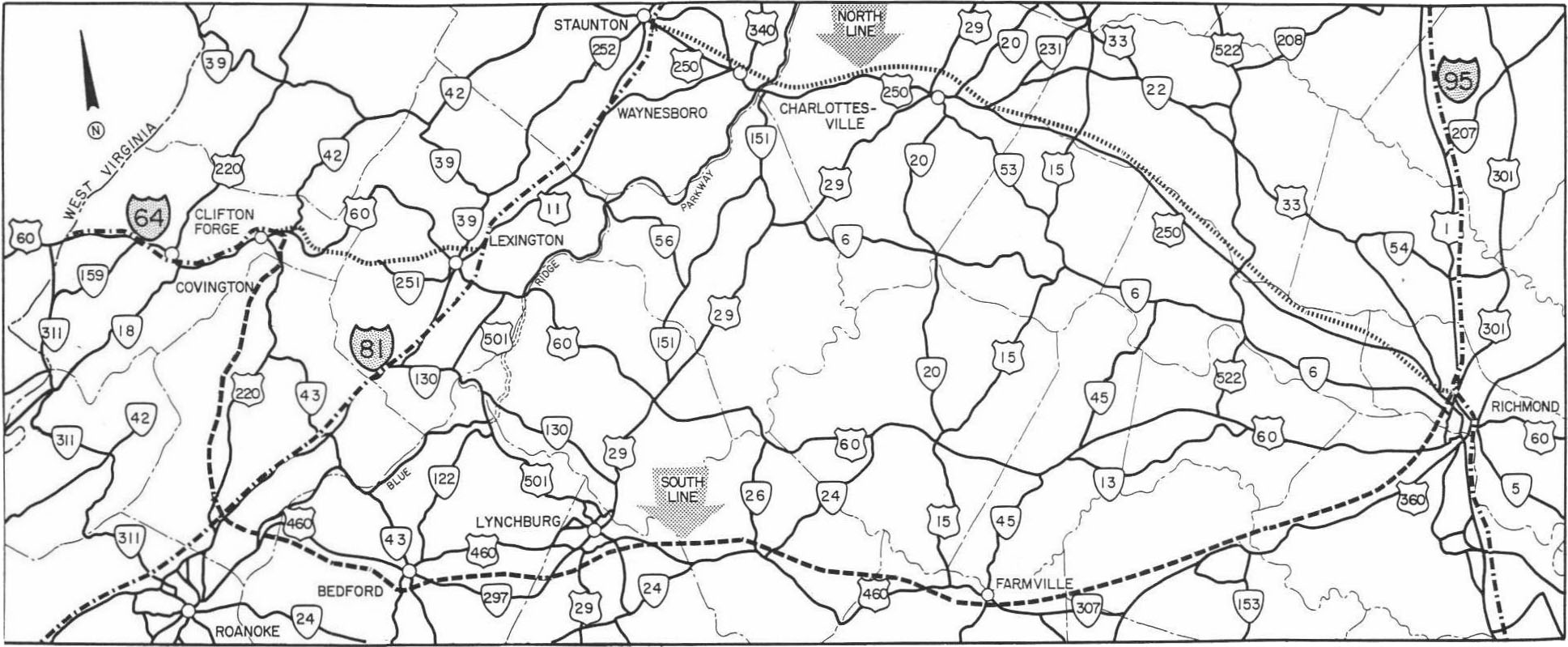
Map from a 1958 study showing the two routes between Clifton Forge and Richmond

Construction of I-64 in Virginia began in early 1960s and completed by 1970s. The highway was finished throughout the state by 1977, Providing an Interstate connection across Virginia, from the West Virginia state to Hampton Roads.

== Auxiliary routes ==
I-64 has four auxiliary routes, all of which are in the Hampton Roads Area:

- I-264—A bypass route serving the Virginia Beach Oceanfront, Downtown Norfolk, and most of Portsmouth.
- I-464—A connector route serving the western side of Chesapeake, Portsmouth, and Downtown Norfolk. It connects I-64 in Chesapeake to I-264 in Norfolk.
- I-564—A spur route serving Naval Station Norfolk.
- I-664—A bypass route serving Chesapeake, Suffolk, Newport News, and Hampton.

Both of the bypass routes are shorter than the main leg for through traffic—I-664 is about 15 miles (24 km) shorter than the bypassed main leg while I-264 is about a mile (1.6 km) shorter than the main leg it bypasses.

== Accidents ==
On December 22, 2019, around 69 cars were involved in a pileup on I-64 westbound at the Queen's Creek Bridge near exit 238 (SR 143 east). 51 injuries were reported, including two life-threatening. Per reports, ice and fog were seen at that time.

== Current and future projects ==
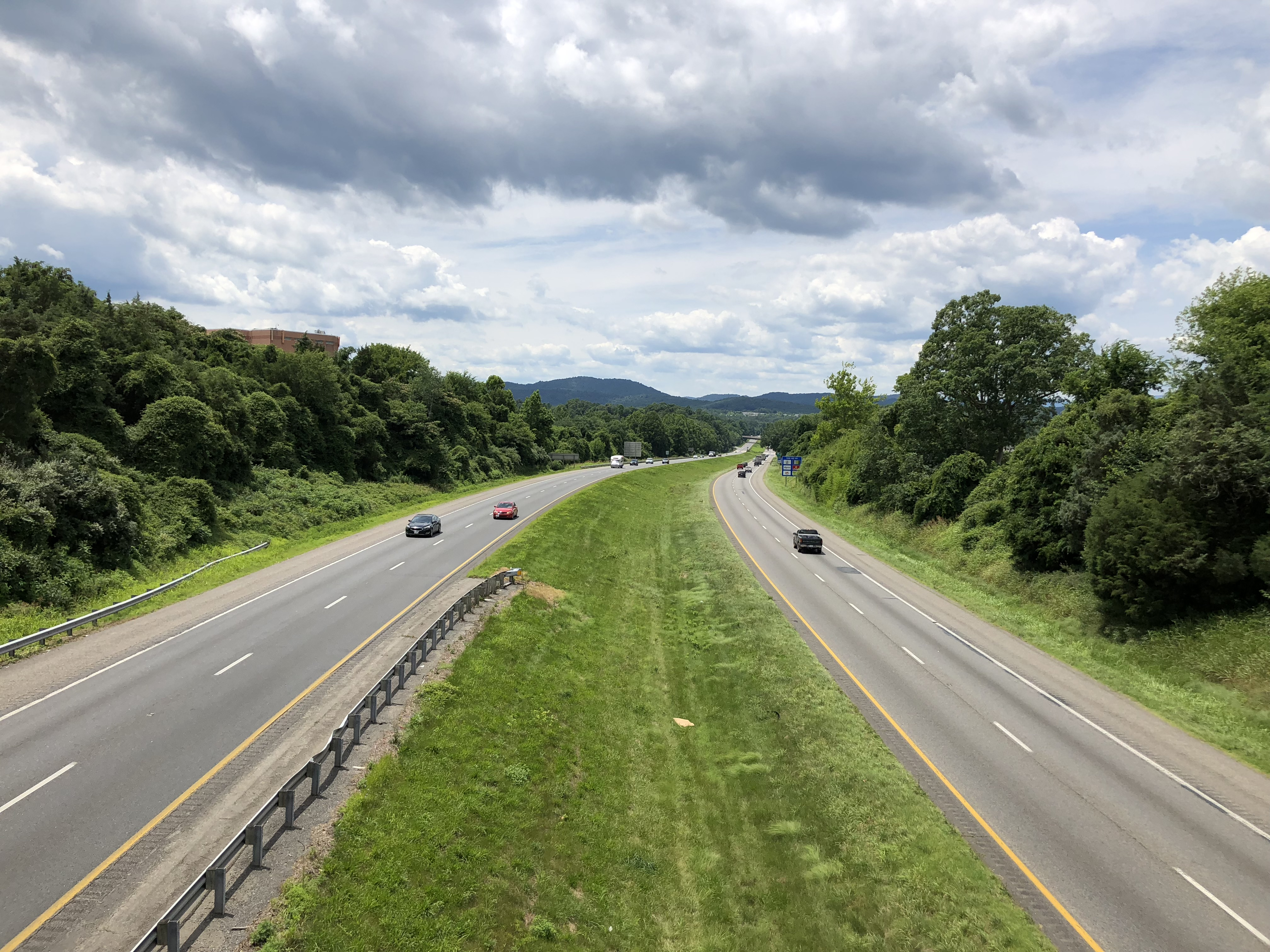
I-64 westbound near Charlottesville

=== I-64 widening projects ===
On the Virginia Peninsula, most of the I-64 corridor was a four-lane roadway and one of the most-traveled segments in the region, connecting the Hampton Roads metropolitan area to the Greater Richmond Region and I-95. In the 2000s, the corridor become a major bottleneck for traffic, with over half of the entire 75-mile (121 km) stretch having failing or near failing levels of service and continued increased safety concerns. In 2011, VDOT initiated a study that would consider widening the highway with either additional general purpose lanes in the median and/or on the outside shoulder, adding two-lane, fully reversible managed lanes (either as a tolled express lane or an HOT-lane facility) or the addition of full tolling on the entire span. The approved plan selected by VDOT and partners included the plan that added an additional general purpose lane in each direction by either expanding into the median or on the outside shoulder.

Three segments on I-64 have been identified as candidates for widening: The rural section of I-64 from I-295 near Richmond to the York County/James City County line, from the York County/James City County line to Newport News, and from Newport News to I-464/US 17/SR 168 interchange in Chesapeake to the Bowers Hill Interchange in Suffolk. Following the completion of all of these widening segments in summer 2029, the entirety of I-64 east of Richmond will consist of at least three lanes in each direction.

Richmond to Williamsburg

In the Richmond area, a project was undertaken to widen I-64 to six lanes from exit 200 (I-295) in Henrico County to exit 205 (Bottoms Bridge) in New Kent County. The project was managed by Corman-Branch, a joint venture at an estimated cost of $43 million (equivalent to $51.9 million in 2024). Construction began in August 2017 and was completed in summer 2019.

In the mid-2020s, the Virginia Department of Transportation commenced an effort to widen I-64 from four to six lanes from Bottoms Bridge to the York County/James City County line. This project is divided into three sections:

- Segment A – 10.7 miles from mile markers 204.9 (just west of the Bottoms Bridge exit) to 215.6 (just east of the New Kent Courthouse/Providence Forge exit). Construction commenced in Fall 2023, with expected completion in Summer 2027 at a cost of $209.5 million.
- Segment B – 8.7 miles from mile markers 215.6 (just east of the New Kent Courthouse/Providence Forge exit) to 224.3 (at the New Kent/James City County line). Construction started in early 2025, with expected completion in Summer 2029 at a cost of $208.3 million.
- Segment C – 9 miles From the New Kent/James City County line to approximately 1.15 miles west of Route 199 (exit 234). Construction started in Fall 2024, with expected completion in Fall 2027 at a cost of $174 million.

Virginia Peninsula

In June 2013, the Commonwealth Transportation Board (CTB) included $100 million (equivalent to $132 million in 2024) in funding for expanding I-64 in its Six-Year Improvement Program, allowing the project in North Hampton Roads to move forward into the design and build phases. The Hampton Roads Transportation Planning Organization (HRTPO) allocated an additional $44 million (equivalent to $56.2 million in 2024) to Segment I of the project to extend the boundaries beyond the Fort Eustis interchange. The project is broken down into three operationally independent segments, which are independently funded, designed and built by a different company.

- Segment I encompassed the portion of I-64 beginning west of SR 143 (Jefferson Avenue; exit 255) to just east of SR 238 (Yorktown Road; exit 247). Construction on this segment began in September 2015 and was completed December 1, 2017. It was managed by Shirley Contracting Company LLC at a total cost of $122 million (equivalent to $153 million in 2024).
- Segment II began 1.05 miles (1.69 km) west of SR 199 (Humelsine Parkway/Marquis Center Parkway) near exit 242 and ended 0.54 miles (0.87 km) east of SR 238 (Yorktown Road) near exit 247, where Segment I ends. Construction on this segment was managed by Alan Myers VA LLC and costed $138 million (equivalent to $167 million in 2024). Construction began in the autumn of 2016 and was completed in spring 2019.
- Segment III begins approximately one mile (1.6 km) west of SR 199 (Newman Road; exit 234) to 1.05 miles (1.69 km) west of SR 199 (Humelsine Parkway/Marquis Center Parkway; exit 242), where Segment II ended. Construction on this segment is managed by Shirley Contracting Company LLC with an estimated cost of $178 million. Construction began in August 2018 and is estimated to be complete in autumn 2021.

South Hampton Roads

Similar to I-64 west of Newport News on the Peninsula, VDOT and the HRTPO undertook environmental and preliminary engineering studies for the improvement of the eight-mile (13 km), 48-year-old corridor of the I-64 from I-464 in Chesapeake to the Bower's Hill Interchange. This included replacing the functionally obsolete High Rise Bridge, which was completed one year after the study corridor opened, in 1969.

This study, completed in 2013, showed that the corridor frequently performed at near-failing levels of service (level of service grades D and E), with the High Rise Bridge itself outright failing, resulting in higher crash rates when compared to other areas in the region. This is because most of the interchange ramps were built to previous Interstate standards and were based on then-rural development in the Western Chesapeake and Eastern Suffolk. In addition, since the start of tolling at the Elizabeth River Tunnels, the High Rise Bridge and the corridor has received a nearly seven-percent increase in traffic during peak hours, further exacerbating the problem.

In March 2015, the CTB identified and approved of the addition of two lanes of capacity in each direction, with the possibility of them being either two HOT lanes, one HOV and one general-purpose lane, or all four lanes being tolled. Widening would be accomplished by adding the lanes in the median east of US 17 and to the outside shoulder west of US 17. The approved plan also calls for the construction of a new, four-lane 135-foot (41 m) fixed-span bridge to the south of the current High Rise Bridge. Construction will be conducted in multiple phases, similar to the widening project on the Peninsula:

- The first phase of the project would widen I-64 to three lanes in each direction by adding the new lane to the median in both directions as a managed lane, begin the construction of the new High Rise Bridge, and replace and rehabilitate other existing bridges in the area. This segment is estimated to cost around $600 million.
- The second phase would see all six lanes of I-64 shifted to the newly constructed bridge while the old bridge is demolished and replaced with a new four-lane bridge that would eventually carry Inner Loop (I-64 west) traffic.
- The final phase would see the addition of the fourth lanes of traffic added to both directions and the shift of Inner Loop/I-64 west to the newly reconstructed bridge.

Once completed, the entire corridor would be an eight-lane stretch of highway, with two 135-foot (41 m) fixed-span bridges. Estimated costs for the entire project are currently estimated at $2.3 billion. Currently, only part of first phase of the plan has been funded, which includes preliminary engineering and right-of-way service. A final design for the project is expected in December 2016, and a final contract award date is tentatively scheduled for August 2017.

=== I-64 Express Lanes ===
State and regional leaders have come up to convert the region's 32 miles (51 km) of existing high occupancy vehicle (HOV-2) lanes into high occupancy toll (HOT-2) lanes called the I-64 Express Lanes. According to a 2016 study by VDOT, only 1,600 vehicles travel through the Norfolk HOV lanes during the morning HOV restriction (6:00–8:00 am) and only 1,300 vehicles through the lanes through Virginia Beach and Chesapeake. The plans for the I-64 Express Lanes have been divided into individual segments, all of which have been endorsed by the regions transportation planning organization.

Segment 1 converted the two-lane reversible roadway in Norfolk between the I-64/I-564 interchange and the I-64/I-264 interchange to HOT-2 lanes. Inner Loop traffic (eastbound from Hampton through Norfolk) enters through the ramp just prior to the I-564 interchange and exits through either the left exit directly to I-264 east, the slip ramp back to the Inner Loop for the interchange to I-264 west, or continue straight into mainline Inner Loop on the other side of the interchange. Outer Loop (westbound from Chesapeake to Norfolk) traffic enters the lanes at the ramp just after the I-64 Twin Bridges at the Elizabeth River, I-264 west traffic (from Virginia Beach to Downtown Norfolk) uses the flyover ramp from mainline I-264 to the Express Lanes, and I-264 east traffic (from Downtown Norfolk to Virginia Beach) merges onto the Outer Loop and utilizes the slip ramp entry. Tolling is operational 24/7. Minimum toll during these periods is $0.50 and increases proportionally to traffic. Toll gantry installation and conversion was completed January 10, 2018, slightly behind schedule.

Segment 2 would convert the single HOV-2 diamond lanes in each direction to HOT-2 lanes and would also include the newly expanded High Rise Bridge and associated lanes of I-64 from the I-464/I-64 interchange. Both directions would have a primary entrance/exit near the Bowers Hill interchange, with a midpoint entrance/exit near the Greenbrier Parkway/Battlefield Boulevard interchanges and a terminal entrance/exit that ties in at the Twin Bridges. The current HOV lanes would be reduced from 16 to 12 feet (4.9 to 3.7 m) (allowing the installation of the tubular road markers separating the general purpose lanes from the tolled express lanes), and new 12-foot (3.7 m) lanes would be built extend across the I-64/I-464 interchange and be built into the new High Rise Bridge and all the way to the Bower's Hill interchange. These lanes would be continuously operational once activated and would be variably priced depending on the traffic in the general-purpose lanes. This segment is scheduled to be completed as part of the High Rise Bridge project, which is scheduled for completion in 2021.

Segment 3 would be built as part of the HRBT Expansion Project and would build from the existing reversible HOV northern terminus at I-564/I-64 through, across the expanded bridge–tunnel, and through the existing HOV-2 diamond lanes in Hampton. Planning for this segment (such as operational times and tolling pricing) will continue as the HRBT Expansion Project continues and would open at the same time as the new HRBT opens in 2024.

Segment 4 would convert the remaining diamond lanes on I-64 in Hampton & Newport News to HOT-2 lanes as an extension of the HRBT Expansion Project. Detailed studies for this project, including operational hours, planning, and design, will occur in 2018 and would open along with the completion of the HRBT Expansion Project.

=== Hampton Roads Bridge–Tunnel Expansion Project ===
According to VDOT, in 1958, an average of 6,000 vehicles a day used the facility whereas an average of 88,000 vehicles a day were using the crossing in 2008, with volumes exceeding 100,000 during the tourist season, well exceeding the original design capacity of 77,000 vehicles per day, which sparked decades of debate on how to improve traffic flow at the region's most important water crossing. Studies into the growing traffic at the HRBT have roots back to the early 1990s. In 1992, the Virginia General Assembly had requested that VDOT study growing traffic at the HRBT. The conclusion of that study determined that a longterm large-scale solution to the problem would be required to alleviate backups. For the next 14 years, VDOT would undertake numerous studies in 1999, 2008, 2012, and 2016 to help choose a candidate build that was financially and physically feasible to build. On October 29, 2020, a groundbreaking ceremony was held in Hampton for the HRBT Expansion Project.

After nearly two decades of studies and planning, the CTB and the two regional boards responsible for the project (HRTPO/Hampton Roads Transportation Accountability Commission (HRTAC)) voted unanimously in 2016 to a $3.3-billion expansion of the current bridge–tunnel and its approaches from two to four lanes in both directions from the I-664 interchange to the I-564 interchange, with two new, two-lane bridge–tunnels built to carry traffic eastbound (Hampton to Norfolk). A final environmental impact statement (EIS) was published in May 2017, and the Record of Decision (ROD) from the Federal Highway Administration (FHWA) was granted in June. The project is expected to be completed by November 2027.

== Exit list ==
County	Location	mi	km	Old exit	New exit	Destinations	Notes
Alleghany		0.00	0.00			I-64 west / US 60 west – White Sulphur Springs	Continuation into West Virginia
Alleghany		1.83	2.95		1	Jerry's Run Trail	
Alleghany		2.47	3.98	Virginia Welcome Center (eastbound only)			
Alleghany		7.16	11.52	2	7	SR 661 (Ogle Creek Road)	Eastbound exit and westbound entrance
Alleghany	Callaghan	10.01	16.11	3	10	US 60 east (Midland Trail) / SR 159 south (Dunlap Creek Road) to SR 311 – Callaghan	East end of concurrency with US 60
City of Covington		14.84	23.88	4	14	SR 154 north (Durant Road) – Covington, Hot Springs	
Alleghany	Mallow	16.68	26.84	5	16	US 60 west / US 220 north – Covington, Hot Springs, WESTVACO Trailer Lot	West end of concurrencies with US 60 and US 220; signed as exits 16A (US 60 / US 220) and 16B (WESTVACO Trailer Lot) westbound
Alleghany		21.49	34.58	6	21	SR 696 (Selma Low Moore Road) – Low Moor	
Alleghany	Selma	23.86	38.40	7	24	US 60 Bus. east / US 220 Bus. south (Ridgeway Street) / SR 384 west (Dabney S. Lancaster Community College Road) – Clifton Forge	
Alleghany	Cliftondale Park	27.49	44.24	8	27	US 220 south / US 60 Bus. west (Grafton Street) / SR 629 north (Douthat State Park Road) – Clifton Forge	East end of concurrency with US 220
Alleghany		29.27	47.11	9	29	SR 42 north / SR 269 east (Forty Two Road)	
Alleghany	Longdale Furnace	35.65	57.37	10	35	SR 269 west (Longdale Furnace Road) / SR 850 east (North Mountain Road) – Longdale Furnace	
Rockbridge		42.91	69.06	11	43	SR 780 (Scenic Drive) – Goshen	
Rockbridge		50.29	80.93	12	50	US 60 east / SR 623 (Fredericksburg Road)	East end of concurrency with US 60
Rockbridge	East Lexington	55.68	89.61	13	55	US 11 (Lee Highway) to SR 39 – Lexington, Goshen	
Rockbridge		56.66	91.19	14	56	I-81 south – Roanoke	I-81 exit 191; west end of concurrency with I-81
Rockbridge		60.53	97.41	53	195	US 11 (Lee Highway) – Lexington	Exit numbers follow I-81
Rockbridge	Fairfield	66.10	106.38	53A	200	SR 710 (Sterrett Road) – Fairfield	
Rockbridge	Raphine	70.59	113.60	54	205	SR 606 (Raphine Road) – Raphine, Steeles Tavern	
Augusta	Greenville	78.62	126.53	55	213	US 11 (Lee Highway) to US 340 – Greenville	Split into exits 213A (south) and 213B (north) westbound
Augusta	Mint Spring	83.36	134.15	55A	217	SR 654 (White Hill Road) – Mint Spring, Stuarts Draft	
Augusta	Jolivue	85.83	138.13	55B	220	SR 262 (Woodrow Wilson Parkway) to US 11 – Staunton	
Augusta	Jolivue	87.14	140.24	15	87	I-81 north – Staunton, Winchester	I-81 exit 221; east end of concurrency with I-81; exit numbers follow I-64
Augusta	Fishersville	91.28	146.90	16	91	SR 285 (Tinkling Spring Road) to SR 608 – Fishersville, Stuarts Draft	
City of Waynesboro		94.62	152.28	17	94	US 340 (Rosser Avenue) – Waynesboro, Stuarts Draft	
City of Waynesboro		96.57	155.41	18	96	SR 624 (Delphine Avenue) – Waynesboro, Lyndhurst	
Augusta		99.58	160.26	19	99	US 250 (Three Notch'd Mountain Highway) – Afton, Waynesboro	Access to the Blue Ridge Parkway and Skyline Drive
Nelson	Rockfish Gap			Scenic View (eastbound only)			
Albemarle	Yancey Mills	107.22	172.55	20	107	US 250 (Rockfish Gap Turnpike) – Crozet, Yancey Mills	
Albemarle		114.13	183.67	21	114	SR 637 (Dick Woods Road) – Ivy	
Albemarle		118.38	190.51	22	118	US 29 (Monacan Trail Road) – Charlottesville, Culpeper, Lynchburg	Signed as exits 118A (south) and 118B (north)
Albemarle		119.87	192.91	23	120	SR 631 (5th Street) – Charlottesville	
Albemarle		121.60	195.70	24	121	SR 20 (Scottsville Road) – Charlottesville, Scottsville	Signed as exits 121A (south) and 121B (north) eastbound
City of Charlottesville		121.60	195.70	24	121	SR 20 (Scottsville Road) – Charlottesville, Scottsville	Signed as exits 121A (south) and 121B (north) eastbound
Albemarle		124.32	200.07	25	124	US 250 (Richmond Road) – Charlottesville, Shadwell	Diverging Diamond Interchange
Albemarle		129.74	208.80	26	129	SR 616 (Black Cat Road) – Keswick, Boyd Tavern	
Fluvanna	No major junctions						
Louisa	Zion Crossroads	136.73	220.05	27	136	US 15 (James Madison Highway) – Gordonsville, Palmyra	Diverging diamond interchange
Louisa	Ferncliff	143.05	230.22	28	143	SR 208 (Courthouse Road) – Louisa, Ferncliff	
Goochland	Shannon Hill	148.82	239.50	29	148	SR 605 (Shannon Hill Road) – Shannon Hill	
Goochland		152.74	245.81	30	152	SR 629 (Old Fredericksburg Road) – Hadensville	
Louisa	Gum Spring	159.43	256.58	31	159	US 522 (Cross County Road) – Gum Spring, Goochland, Mineral	
Goochland	Oilville	167.31	269.26	32	167	SR 617 (Oilville Road) – Oilville, Goochland	
Goochland		173.87	279.82	33	173	SR 623 (Ashland Road) – Rockville, Manakin	
Goochland		175.06	281.73		175	SR 288 south (World War II Veterans Memorial Highway) – Chesterfield	Opened in 2003
Henrico	Short Pump	177.98	286.43	34	177	I-295 to I-95 – Washington, Norfolk, Airport	I-295 exit 53; left exit eastbound; trumpet interchange
Henrico		178.85	287.83	35	178	US 250 (Broad Street) – Short Pump	Signed as exits 178A (west) and 178B (east)
Henrico		180.28	290.13	36	180	Gaskins Road	Signed as exits 180A (south) and 180B (north)
Henrico		181.67	292.37	37	181	Parham Road	Signed as exits 181A (south) and 181B (north) westbound
Henrico		183.70	295.64	38	183	US 250 (Broad Street) / Glenside Drive	Signed as exits 183A (Glenside Drive south), 183B (US 250 east), and 183C (US 250 west / Glenside Drive north) westbound
Henrico	Dumbarton	185.73	298.90	39	185	US 33 (Staples Mill Road) / Staples Mill Parkway	Signed as exits 185A (Staples Mill Parkway to US 33 west) and 185B (east) eastbound
City of Richmond		187.07	301.06	40	186	I-195 south / SR 197 (Laburnum Avenue) / to Powhite Parkway – Downtown Richmond	Eastbound exit to and westbound entrance from Laburnum Avenue
City of Richmond		187.31	301.45	41	187	I-95 north (Richmond–Petersburg Turnpike) – Washington	I-95 exit 79; west end of concurrency with I-95
City of Richmond		188.14	302.78	14	78	SR 161 (Boulevard)	Exit numbers follow I-95
City of Richmond		190.33	306.31	13B	76B	US 1 / US 301 (Belvidere Street)	No westbound exit
City of Richmond		190.56	306.68	13A	76A	US 1 / US 301 (Chamberlayne Avenue)	Westbound exit and eastbound entrance
City of Richmond		190.86	307.16	43	190	I-95 south (Richmond–Petersburg Turnpike) / 3rd Street / 5th Street – Petersburg, Downtown Richmond, Coliseum, Convention Center	I-95 exit 75; east end of concurrency with I-95; eastbound exit is for 3rd Street; westbound exit is for 5th Street; eastbound and westbound entrances are from 7th Street; exit numbers follow I-64
City of Richmond		192.53	309.85	44	192	US 360 (Mechanicsville Turnpike) – Mechanicsville	
Henrico		193.89	312.04	45	193	SR 33 (Nine Mile Road)	Signed as exits 193A (west) and 193B (east)
Henrico	Montrose	196.03	315.48	46	195	SR 197 (Laburnum Avenue)	
Henrico	Sandston	197.91	318.51	47	197	SR 156 (Airport Drive) – Highland Springs, Sandston, Richmond International Airport	Formerly signed as exits 197A (south) and 197B (north). Loops B & D were removed in 2019.
Henrico		201.98	325.06	48	200	I-295 / US 60 – Rocky Mount, NC, Washington	I-295 exit 28
New Kent	Bottoms Bridge	206.01	331.54	49	205	SR 33 west / SR 249 east (New Kent Highway) to US 60 – Bottoms Bridge, Quinton	West end of concurrency with SR 33
New Kent		211.44	340.28	50	211	SR 106 (Emmaus Church Road) – Talleysville, Roxbury	
New Kent		214.91	345.86	51	214	SR 155 (Courthouse Road) – New Kent Courthouse, Providence Forge	
New Kent		220.60	355.02	52	220	SR 33 east (Eltham Road) – West Point	East end of concurrency with SR 33
James City		227.34	365.87	53	227	SR 30 (Old Stage Road) to US 60 – West Point, Toano, Williamsburg	
James City		231.62	372.76	54	231	SR 607 (Croaker Road) to SR 30 – Croaker, Norge, Toano	Signed as exits 231A (Norge) and 231B (Croaker)
York		234.46	377.33	55	234	SR 199 east (Humelsine Parkway) / SR 646 west (Newman Road) – Lightfoot	Signed as exits 234A (SR 199) and 234B (SR 646) westbound
York		239.17	384.91	56	238	SR 143 east (Merrimac Trail) to US 60 – Camp Peary, Colonial Williamsburg	
York		242.61	390.44	57	242	SR 199 (Marquis Center Parkway / Humelsine Parkway)	Signed as exits 242A (west) and 242B (east)
York		244.23	393.05	58	243	To US 60 (Pocahontas Trail) / SR 143 west (Merrimac Trail) – Busch Gardens, Williamsburg	Split into exits 243A (US 60) and 243B (SR 143); no access to eastbound SR 143 or from SR 143
James City		246.86	397.28	59	247	SR 143 (Merrimac Trail) to SR 238 – Yorktown, Lee Hall	Exit ramp from eastbound I-64 to SR 143 and entrance ramps from eastbound SR 143 to eastbound I-64 and from westbound SR 143 to westbound I-64
City of Newport News		248.48	399.89	59	247	SR 238 (Yorktown Road) – Yorktown, Lee Hall	Westbound exit and eastbound entrance
City of Newport News		250.52	403.17	60	250	SR 105 (Fort Eustis Boulevard) – Yorktown, Fort Eustis	Signed as exits 250A (west) and 250B (east)
City of Newport News		255.55	411.27	61	255	SR 143 (Jefferson Avenue)	Signed as exits 255A (east) and 255B (west)
City of Newport News		256.96	413.54	61A	256	SR 171 (Victory Boulevard / Oyster Point Road) – Poquoson	Signed as exits 256A (west) and 256B (east)
City of Newport News		258.77	416.45	62	258	US 17 (J. Clyde Morris Boulevard) – Yorktown	Signed as exits 258A (south) and 258B (north)
City of Hampton		261.80	421.33	62A-B	261	Hampton Roads Center Parkway	No access from westbound I-64 to eastbound Hampton Roads Center Parkway or from westbound Hampton Roads Center Parkway to eastbound I-64; signed as exits 261A (west) and 261B (east) eastbound
City of Hampton		263.13	423.47	63	262	SR 134 north (Neil Armstrong Parkway) / Hampton Roads Center Parkway east – NASA, Poquoson	Westbound exit, eastbound entrance; west end of concurrency with SR 134; signed as exit 262B
City of Hampton		263.65	424.30	64	263	US 258 / SR 134 south (Mercury Boulevard) – Coliseum, James River Bridge	East end of concurrency with SR 134; signed as exits 263A (US 258 south) and 263B (US 258 north / SR 134 south) westbound
City of Hampton		264.84	426.22	65	264	I-664 south (Hampton Roads Beltway) – Downtown Newport News, Suffolk, Chesapeake	I-664 exit 1; I-64 joins Hampton Roads Beltway
City of Hampton		265.61	427.46	66	265A 265A-B	La Salle Avenue SR 134 (Armistead Avenue) / La Salle Avenue	Eastbound signage Westbound signage
City of Hampton		265.61	427.46	67	265C	Armistead Avenue (SR 134) – Langley Air Force Base	No westbound exit; formerly signed for Rip Rap Road
City of Hampton		268.12	431.50	68	267	US 60 west / SR 143 (Settlers Landing Road) / Woodland Road – Hampton University	West end of concurrency with US 60
City of Hampton		268.45	432.03	69	268	SR 169 east (Mallory Street) – Fort Monroe	
Hampton Roads		271.93	437.63	Hampton Roads Bridge–Tunnel			
City of Norfolk		272.54	438.61	70	272	W. Ocean View Avenue – Willoughby Spit	
City of Norfolk		274.28	441.41	71	273	US 60 east (4th View Street) – Ocean View	East end of US 60 overlap
City of Norfolk		275.58	443.50	72	274	Bay Avenue – Naval Station	Westbound exit and eastbound entrance
City of Norfolk		276.98	445.76	73	276A 276B	I-564 to SR 406 (Terminal Boulevard) – Naval Base US 460 (Granby Street)	Consolidated into exit 276 eastbound; exit 276B is a left exit; no access from eastbound I-64 to eastbound US 460; access from westbound I-64 to westbound US 460 via exit 276C
City of Norfolk		276.98	445.76		♦	I-64 Express east (HOT Lanes)	Western terminus of HOT lanes; eastbound exit and westbound entrance
City of Norfolk		276.98	445.76		♦	I-564 west – Naval Base	Westbound exit and eastbound right entrance for reversible HOT lanes
City of Norfolk		276.98	445.76	74	276C	SR 165 (Little Creek Road) to US 460 west	Westbound exit and eastbound entrance; eastbound access via exit 276 and US 460
City of Norfolk		278.36	447.98	75	277	SR 168 (Tidewater Drive)	Signed as exits 277A (south) and 277B (north)
City of Norfolk		279.40	449.65	76	278	SR 194 (Chesapeake Boulevard)	Westbound exit and entrance only to and from northbound, eastbound exit and entrance only to and from southbound
City of Norfolk		280.40	451.26	77	279	SR 247 (Norview Avenue) – Norfolk International Airport	Signed as exits 279A (west) and 279B (east) westbound
City of Norfolk		281.66	453.29	78	281	SR 165 (Military Highway) / Robin Hood Road	Signed as exits 281A (Robin Hood Road) and 281B (SR 165 south) eastbound; no eastbound entrance
City of Norfolk		282.85	455.20	79	282	US 13 (Northampton Boulevard) – Chesapeake Bay Bridge-Tunnel	No access from northbound US 13 to westbound I-64
City of Norfolk		284.59	458.00	80	284	I-264 (Virginia Beach Expressway) to SR 403 (Newtown Road) – Virginia Beach, Downtown Norfolk, Portsmouth	I-264 exit 14; signed as exits 284A (west) and 284B (east); eastbound exit 284A includes a flyover to I-264 east, so exit 284B is signed only for Newtown Road in that direction; east end of directional (east–west) signage; I-64 east is signed as inner loop (clockwise) and I-64 west is signed as outer loop (counterclockwise).
City of Norfolk					♦	I-264 east – Virginia Beach	Inner loop exit and outer loop right entrance for reversible HOT lanes
City of Norfolk					♦	I-64 Express west (HOT Lanes)	Clockwise terminus of HOT lanes; outer loop exit and inner loop entrance
Eastern Branch Elizabeth River		285.41	459.32	C. Roger Malbon, Sr. Memorial Bridges			
City of Virginia Beach		287.28	462.33	81	286	Indian River Road	Signed as exits 286A (west) and 286B (east)
City of Chesapeake		289.83	466.44	82	289	Greenbrier Parkway	Signed as exits 289A (north) and 289B (south)
City of Chesapeake		291.96	469.86	83	290	SR 168 north / SR 168 Bus. south (Battlefield Boulevard) – Great Bridge	Signed as exits 290A (north) and 290B (South Business). Outer loop end of concurrency with SR 168
City of Chesapeake		292.52	470.77	84	291	I-464 north (Martin Luther King Jr. Expressway) / US 17 south (Dominion Boulevard) / SR 168 south (Oak Grove Connector) – Norfolk, Elizabeth City, Outer Banks	I-464 exit 1; SR 168 exit 15A; no access from outer loop I-64 to southbound US 17; signed as exits 291A (I-464) and 291B (US 17 / SR 168); inner loop end of concurrency with SR 168; outer loop end of concurrency with US 17; signed as exits 291B (SR 168) and 292 (US 17) counterclockwise (outer)
City of Chesapeake		293.25	471.94	85	292	SR 190 (Great Bridge Boulevard) to US 17 – Elizabeth City	Outer loop exit only
City of Chesapeake				High Rise Bridge over Southern Branch Elizabeth River			
City of Chesapeake		296.85	477.73	86	296	US 17 north / US 17 Bus. south (George Washington Highway) – Deep Creek, Portsmouth	Inner loop end of US 17 overlap; signed as exits 296A (north) and 296B (south) on inner loop
City of Chesapeake		298.31	480.08	87	297	US 13 / US 460 (Military Highway)	
City of Chesapeake		300.62	483.80	88	299	I-264 east – Portsmouth, Norfolk I-664 north (Hampton Roads Beltway) to US 13 / US 58 / US 460 – Bowers Hill, Suffolk, Newport News	Eastern terminus; western terminus of I-264; southern terminus and exit 15B on I-664; signed as exits 299A (east) and 299B (north)
1.000 mi = 1.609 km; 1.000 km = 0.621 mi: Concurrency terminus; HOV only; Incomplete access

Interstate 64
Previous state: West Virginia	Virginia	Next state: Terminus
