= Virginia State Route 249 =

State highway in New Kent County, Virginia, US

State Route 249
- New Kent Highway

Route information
- Maintained by VDOT
- Length: 18.43 mi (29.66 km)
- Existed: early 1970s–present
- Tourist routes: Virginia Byway

Major junctions
- West end: I-64 / SR 33 near Bottoms Bridge
- SR 106 / SR 609 in Talleysville; SR 155 / SR 608 at Carps Corner
- East end: SR 30 / SR 33 at Angelview Church

Location
- Country: United States
- State: Virginia
- Counties: New Kent

Highway system
- Virginia Routes; Interstate; US; Primary; Secondary; Byways; History; HOT lanes
← SR 247	→ US 250

State Route 249 (SR 249) is a primary state highway in the U.S. state of Virginia. Known as New Kent Highway, the state highway runs 18.43 miles (29.66 km) from Interstate 64 (I-64) and SR 33 near Bottoms Bridge east to SR 33 and SR 30 at Angelview Church. According to signage on the segment of New Kent Highway between U.S. Route 60 (US 60) and I-64, SR 249 extends slightly south from I-64 to end at US 60. SR 249, which is the old alignment of SR 33 before that highway was rerouted onto I-64, is the main local highway of northern New Kent County, providing access to the county seat of New Kent.

== Route description ==
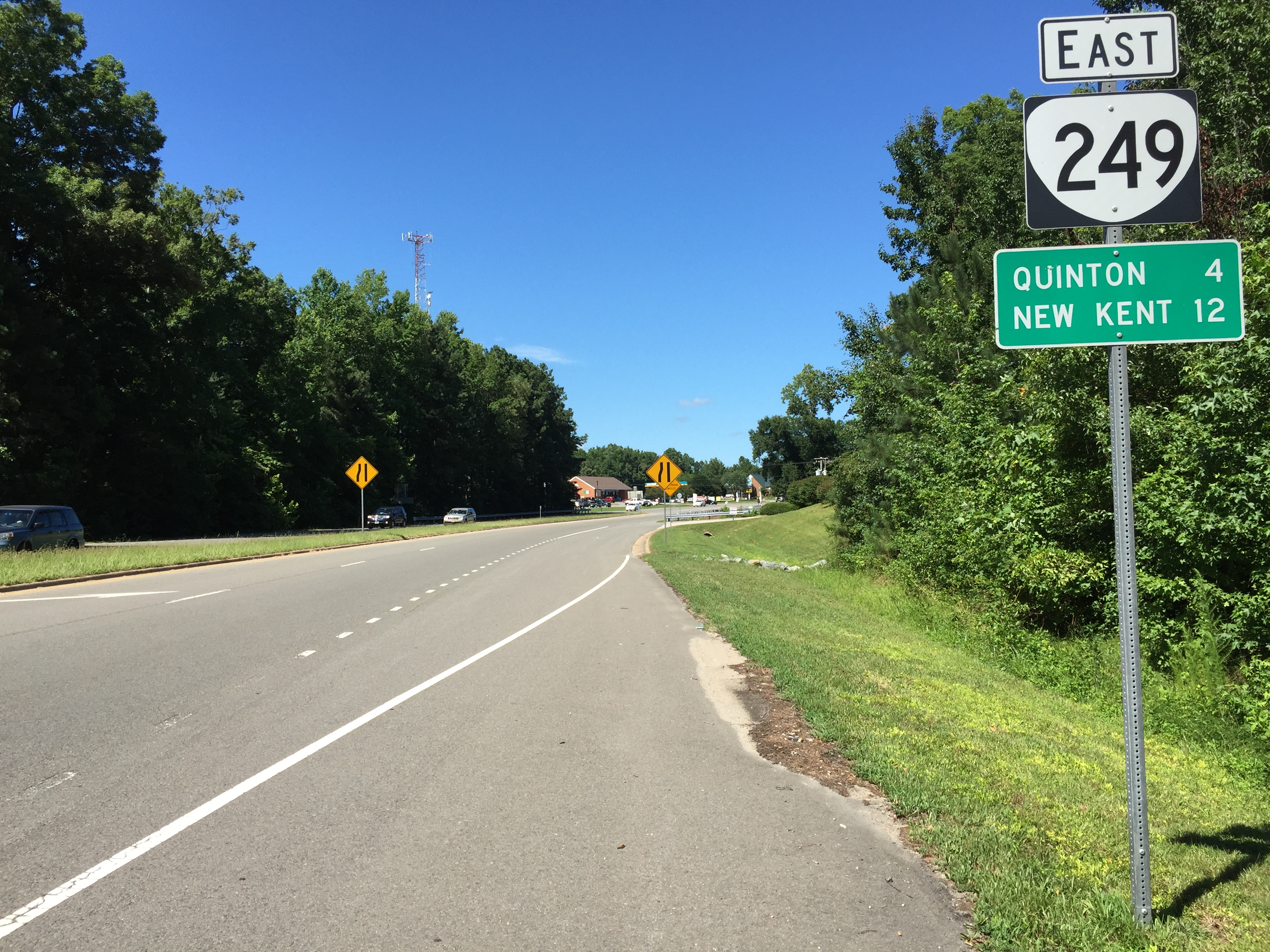
View east along SR 249 at I-64/SR 33 near Bottoms Bridge

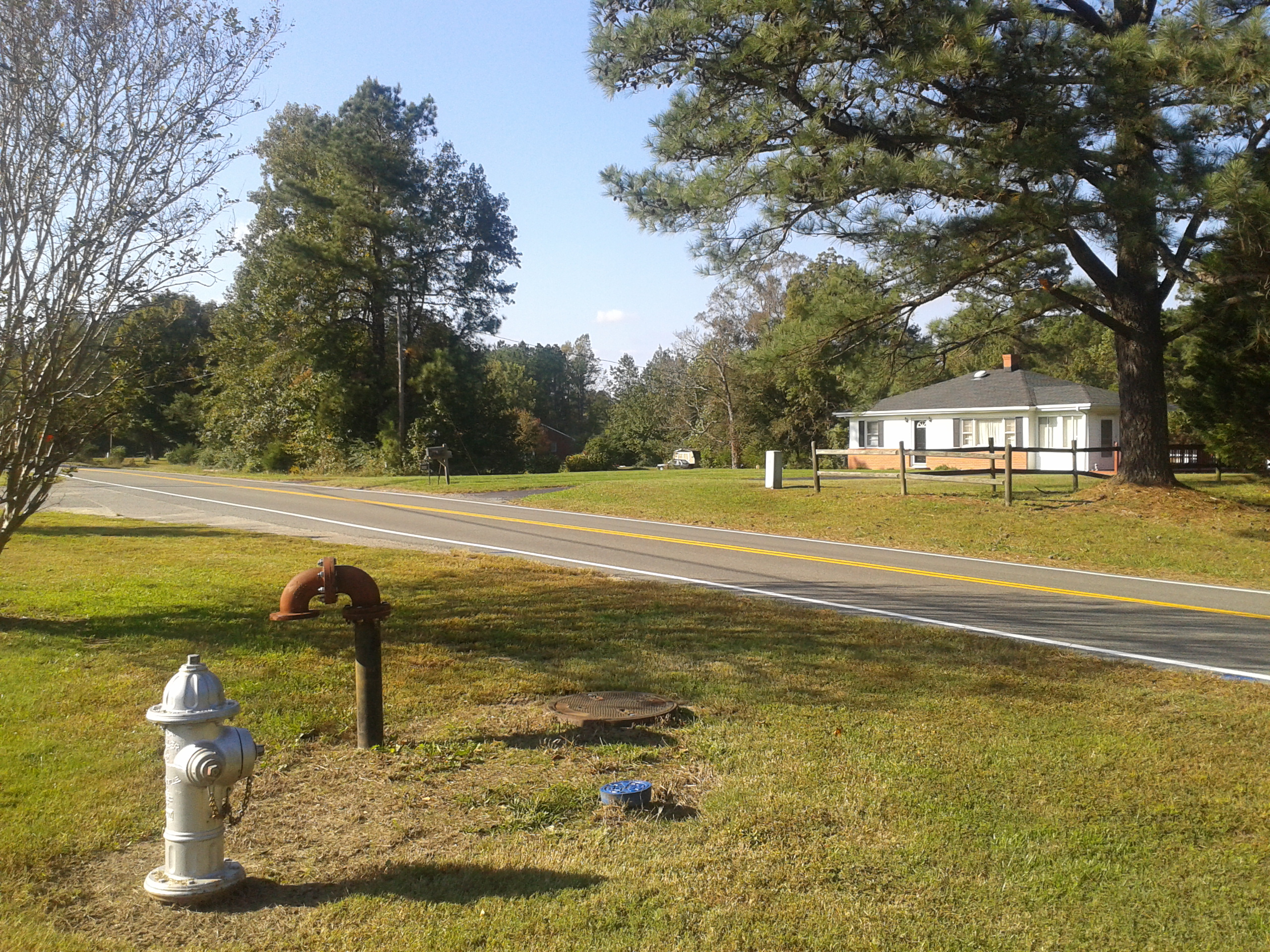
House along SR 249 in Quinton

SR 249 begins at a partial cloverleaf interchange with I-64 and SR 33 near Bottoms Bridge at the western end of New Kent County. New Kent Highway continues south as SR 33 to that highway's junction with US 60 though this short 0.4-mile-long (0.64 km) segment of road is also signed as SR 249. SR 249 passes through the interchange as a four-lane divided highway but reduces to a two-lane undivided road as it curves east. The state highway passes through the hamlet of Quinton and meets the northern end of SR 106 (Emmaus Church Road) at a roundabout in Talleysville. East of Carps Corner, the site of the highway's junction with SR 155 (Courthouse Road), SR 249 passes through New Kent, which features the county courthouse, county offices, and the county's high school and middle school. The state highway reaches its eastern terminus at a four-way intersection with SR 30 and SR 33 at Angelview Church. SR 33 passes through the intersection as Eltham Road. SR 30 heads east concurrently with SR 33 toward West Point and southeast along a continuation of New Kent Highway toward Williamsburg.

== History ==
The current SR 249 was assigned in the early 1970s to a portion of former State Route 33 in New Kent County. The western 11 miles (18 km) roughly follow the old Richmond-Williamsburg Stage Road, and it currently is named New Kent Highway. (The continuation east across SR 33 as State Route 632 is still named Old Stage Road.) The Old Stage Road was one of two routes heavily used by both Confederate and Union troops in 1862 during the Peninsula Campaign of the American Civil War.

In the early 1970s, the new I-64 was under construction east of Richmond. Although primarily following the alignment of US 60 in this area, traffic relief for other roadways was also anticipated. Nearby, SR 33 between Eltham and Quinton in New Kent County had an extraordinarily high accident rate due to heavy weekend traffic to waterfront points in eastern Virginia.

== Major intersections ==
The entire route is in New Kent County.

Location	mi	km	Destinations	Notes
			US 60 / SR 33 west (Pocahontas Trail) – New Kent County Airport	Western terminus; west end of SR 33 overlap
	0.00	0.00	I-64 / SR 33 east to I-295 – Richmond, Norfolk, West Point	I-64 exit 205; east end of SR 33 overlap
Talleysville	6.61	10.64	SR 106 south (Emmaus Church Road) / SR 609 north (Old Church Road) to I-64 / US 60 – White House, St. Peters Church	Roundabout; former SR 155 north
Carps Corner	10.39	16.72	SR 155 south (North Courthouse Road) / SR 608 (Old River Road) to I-64	
Angelview Church	18.43	29.66	SR 30 / SR 33 (New Kent Highway / Eltham Road) to I-64 – West Point	Eastern terminus
1.000 mi = 1.609 km; 1.000 km = 0.621 mi: Concurrency terminus
