= Virginia State Route 106 =

State highway in southeastern Virginia, US

State Route 106

Route information
- Maintained by VDOT
- Length: 30.00 mi (48.28 km)
- Existed: 1940–present

Major junctions
- South end: US 460 / US 460 Bus. in Petersburg
- SR 156 near Prince George; SR 10 near Jordan Point; SR 5 / SR 156 near Kimages; US 60 near Roxbury; I-64 / SR 33 near Talleysville
- North end: SR 249 / SR 609 in Talleysville

Location
- Country: United States
- State: Virginia
- Counties: City of Petersburg, Prince George, Charles City, New Kent

Highway system
- Virginia Routes; Interstate; US; Primary; Secondary; Byways; History; HOT lanes
← SR 105	→ SR 107

State Route 106 (SR 106) is a primary state highway in the U.S. state of Virginia. The state highway runs 30.00 miles (48.28 km) from U.S. Route 460 and US 460 Business in Petersburg north to SR 249 in Talleysville. SR 106 connects Prince George County in the southern part of the Richmond–Petersburg metropolitan area with Charles City and New Kent counties on the Virginia Peninsula via the Benjamin Harrison Memorial Bridge over the James River.

== Route description ==
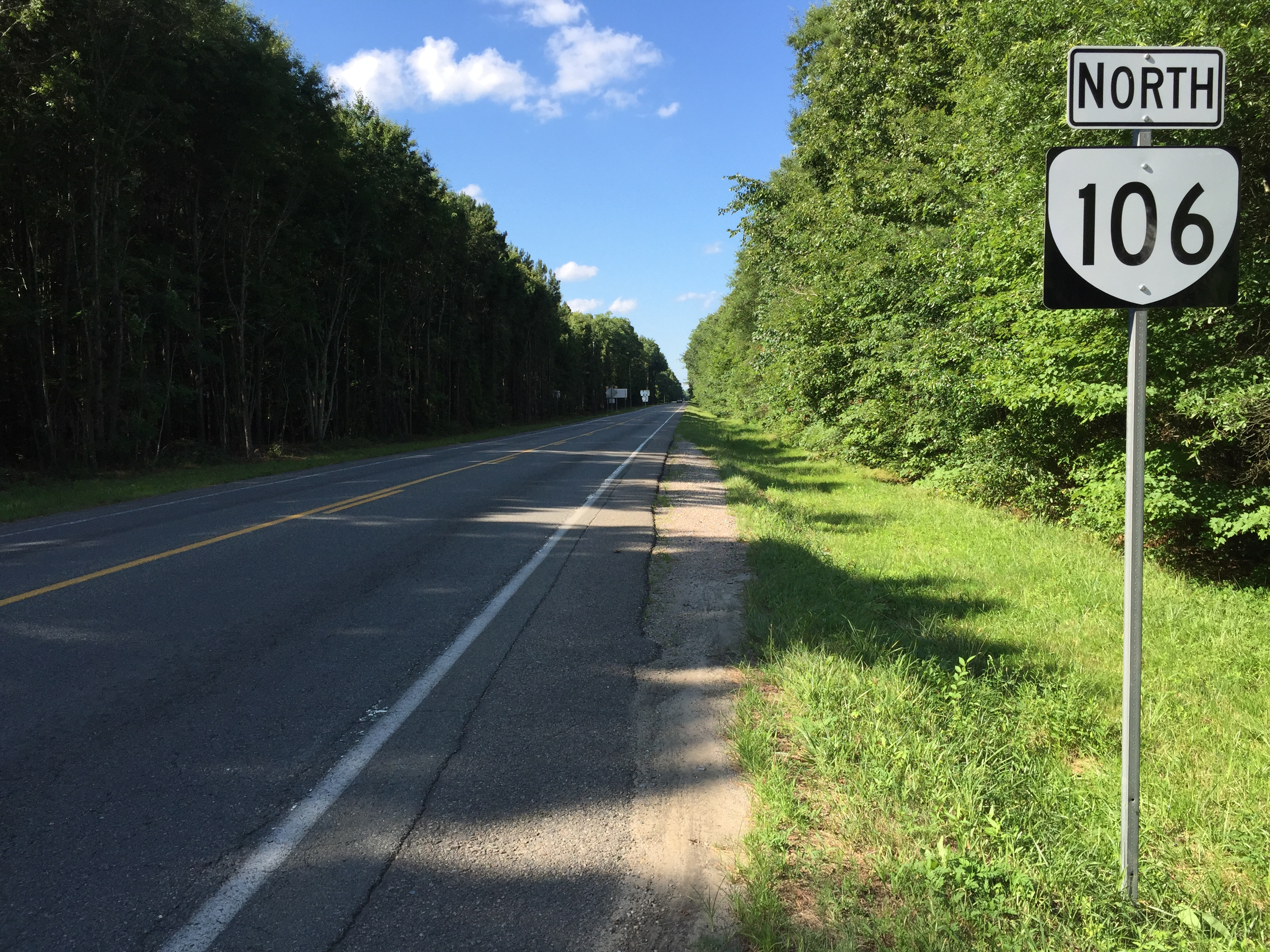
View north along SR 106 at SR 5 and SR 156 near Kimages

SR 106 begins at a four-way intersection in the southeastern corner of the independent city of Petersburg. US 460 heads west as Wagner Road toward Interstate 95 (I-95) and southeast as County Drive toward Suffolk. County Drive heads north as US 460 Business toward downtown Petersburg. SR 106 heads northeast as Courthouse Road, which exits the intersection as a four-lane divided highway but reduces to a two-lane undivided road as the highway leaves Petersburg and enters Prince George County. The state highway heads northeast to the county seat of Prince George, where the highway meets SR 634 (Allin Road) at a roundabout. SR 106 passes under I-295 with no access and passes by the county courthouse and offices. The state highway leaves Prince George and heads northeast to Prince George Drive, which heads south as SR 156 and north as SR 156 Business toward the city of Hopewell.

SR 106 and SR 156 run concurrently northeast as Ruffin Road, which bypasses Hopewell to the south and east. The two highways intersect SR 10 (James River Drive) and turn east to run concurrently with the four-lane divided highway to its next intersection with Jordan Point Road. SR 106 and SR 156 turn north onto two-lane undivided Jordan Point Road, which leads to Jordan Point. There, the two highways cross the James River on the Benjamin Harrison Memorial Bridge, a vertical-lift bridge that is named for Benjamin Harrison V, the father of William Henry Harrison and great-grandfather of Benjamin Harrison. The two highways enter Charles City County as Roxbury Road, which they follow north to SR 5 (John Tyler Memorial Highway). SR 156 turns west with SR 5 while SR 106 continues north to the village of Roxbury, where the highway has a grade crossing with CSX's Peninsula Subdivision.

SR 106 crosses the Chickahominy River into New Kent County and intersects US 60 (Pocahontas Trail). The state highway continues northeast as Emmaus Church Road and has a diamond interchange with I-64 and SR 33. North of the Interstate, SR 106 passes through a roundabout with a pair of stub roads and expands to a four-lane divided highway that passes through a developing residential subdivision. The state highway passes through another roundabout with the incomplete roads of the subdivision before reaching its northern terminus at a roundabout with SR 249 (New Kent Highway) in Talleysville. The north leg of the intersection is SR 609 (Old Church Road), which leads to St. Peter's Church.

== Major intersections ==
County	Location	mi	km	Destinations	Notes
City of Petersburg		0.00	0.00	US 460 / US 460 Bus. west (Wagner Road / County Drive) to I-95 / I-295 – Norfolk, Fort Gregg-Adams	Southern terminus
Prince George		4.85	7.81	SR 156 south / SR 156 Bus. north (Prince George Drive) to US 460 – Hopewell	South end of concurrency with SR 156
Prince George				SR 609 (Old Stage Road)	former SR 106 east
Prince George		9.41	15.14	SR 10 west / SR 156 Bus. south (James River Drive) / SR 644 (Ruffin Road) – Hopewell	South end of concurrency with SR 10
Prince George		10.14	16.32	SR 10 east (James River Drive) – Suffolk	North end of concurrency with SR 10
James River		12.83	20.65	Benjamin Harrison Memorial Bridge	
Charles City		14.14	22.76	SR 5 / SR 156 north (John Tyler Memorial Highway) – Richmond, Williamsburg, Charles City CH	North end of concurrency with SR 156
Charles City	Roxbury			SR 609 (Barnetts Road) / SR 652 (Wiant Lane)	former SR 163 south
New Kent		25.28	40.68	US 60 (Pocahontas Trail) – New Kent County Airport	
New Kent		28.32	45.58	I-64 / SR 33 – Richmond, Norfolk	I-64 exit 211
New Kent	Talleysville	30.00	48.28	SR 249 (New Kent Highway) / SR 609 north (Old Church Road)	Northern terminus; roundabout; former SR 155 north
1.000 mi = 1.609 km; 1.000 km = 0.621 mi: Concurrency terminus
