= Virginia State Route 33 =

State highway in eastern Virginia, US

State Route 33

Route information
- Maintained by VDOT
- Length: 72.23 mi (116.24 km)
- Existed: 1938–present

Major junctions
- West end: US 33 / US 250 in Richmond
- US 1 / US 301 in Richmond; US 60 / SR 156 in Sandston; I-64 / SR 249 in Bottoms Bridge; I-64 near Angelview Church; SR 30 / SR 249 in Angelview Church; SR 30 in West Point; SR 14 in Shacklefords; US 17 / SR 198 in Glenns; US 17 in Saluda; SR 3 in Hartfield
- East end: Chesapeake Boulevard in Stingray Point

Location
- Country: United States
- State: Virginia
- Counties: City of Richmond, Henrico, New Kent, King William, King and Queen, Gloucester, Middlesex

Highway system
- Virginia Routes; Interstate; US; Primary; Secondary; Byways; History; HOT lanes
← US 33	→ SR 34

State Route 33 (SR 33) is a primary state highway in the U.S. state of Virginia. The state highway runs 72.23 miles (116.24 km) from U.S. Route 33 and US 250 in Richmond, Virginia east to Chesapeake Boulevard in Stingray Point. SR 33 is a state-numbered eastward extension of US 33 that connects Richmond with West Point and the Middle Peninsula, one of three large peninsulas on the west side of the Chesapeake Bay in Virginia. The state highway is a major thoroughfare in the downtown and East End areas of Richmond. SR 33 serves a suburban area in eastern Henrico County before running concurrently with US 60, Interstate 64 (I-64), and SR 30 east toward West Point. The state highway heads from West Point through Saluda, east of which SR 33 serves as the main highway of Middlesex County.

== Route description ==
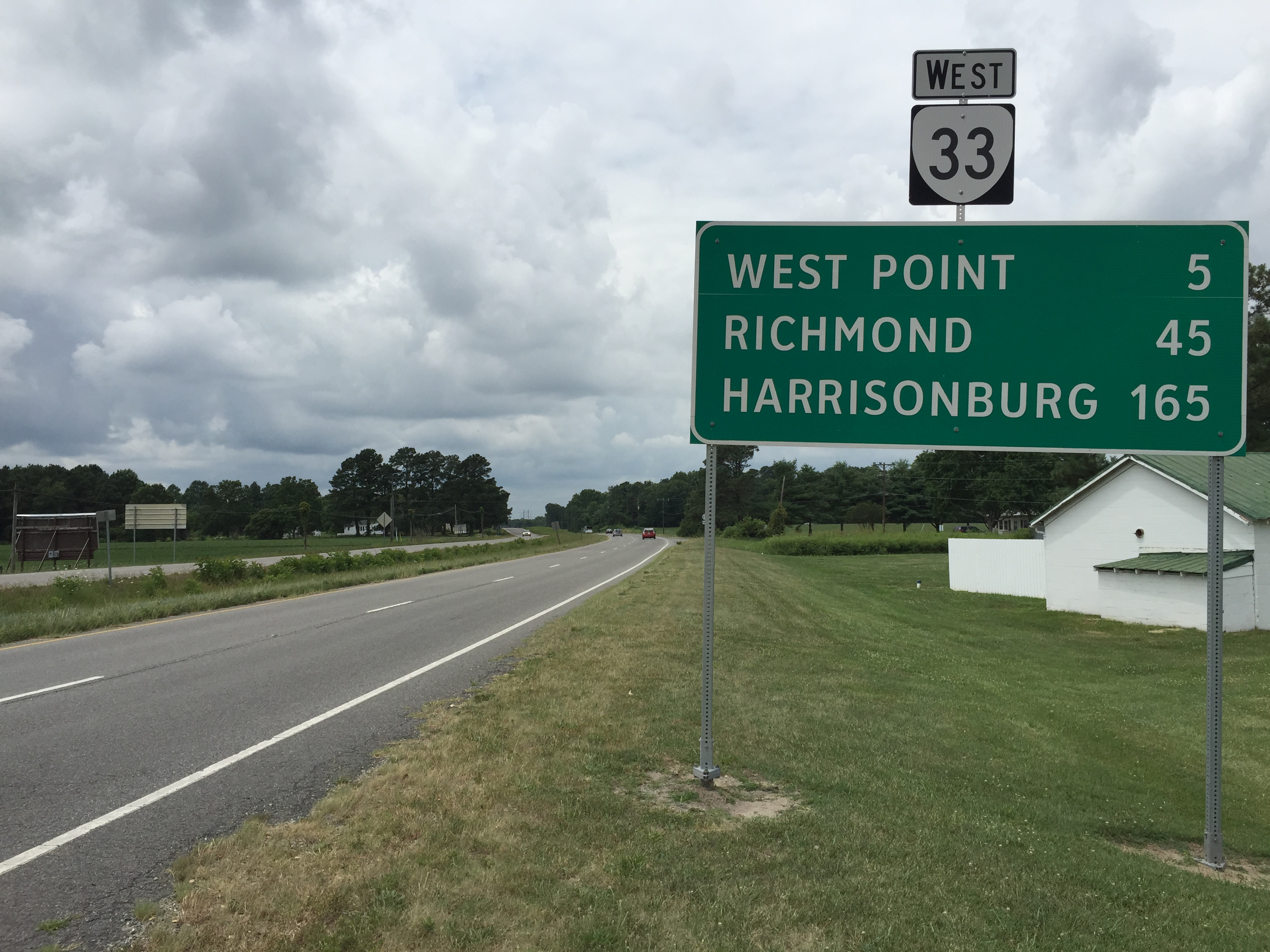
View west along SR 33 at SR 14 in Shacklefords

=== City of Richmond ===
SR 33 begins at an intersection with US 33 and US 250 (Broad Street) in the city of Richmond adjacent to the Siegel Center, the home of the Virginia Commonwealth University Rams basketball teams. Westbound SR 33 runs along two-way Harrison Street and Leigh Street to Leigh Street's intersection with Hancock Street, where eastbound SR 33 begins and US 33 has its eastern terminus. SR 33 continues southeast along four-lane undivided Leigh Street and intersects US 1 and US 301 (Belvidere Street) immediately west of the U.S. Highways' interchange with I-64 and I-95 (Richmond–Petersburg Turnpike).

SR 33 continues through the Jackson Ward along the northern edge of Downtown Richmond, where the highway passes the Maggie L. Walker National Historic Site, the Greater Richmond Convention Center, and Richmond Coliseum, in front of which Leigh Street expands to a divided boulevard and passes under 5th Street and 7th Street. In Court End, the highway passes by the Museum of the Confederacy and through the VCU Medical Center, formerly known as the Medical College of Virginia, the eastern campus of VCU.

SR 33 leaves the downtown area on the four-lane with side bicycle lanes divided Leigh Street Viaduct, officially marked as the Martin Luther King Jr. Memorial Bridge, which passes over I-95, US 360, and CSX's Richmond Terminal Subdivision. At the east end of the viaduct, the state highway turns north onto Mosby Street. SR 33 follows the two-lane with center turn lane street to Fairmount Avenue, a two-lane street the state highway follows through the Church Hill neighborhood southeast to 25th Street. The state highway turns east onto Nine Mile Road and leaves the city of Richmond at its partial cloverleaf interchange with I-64.

=== Richmond to West Point ===
SR 33 passes through the I-64 interchange as a four-lane divided highway, then continues as a five-lane road with center turn lane toward the Henrico County suburb of Highland Springs. East of Laburnum Avenue, around which the state highway is a divided highway, SR 33 reduces to a four-lane undivided highway, then to two lanes as it curves southeast to pass through the center of the unincorporated town. The state highway expands to a five lane road again prior to its intersection with SR 156 (Airport Drive), then drops to two lanes again. In Fair Oaks, SR 33 intersects Norfolk Southern Railway's Richmond District and passes under I-64. The state highway continues through Sandston, site of the Battle of Seven Pines during the Civil War. SR 33 splits into separate roadways prior to its junction with US 60 and SR 156 (Williamsburg Road).

SR 33 continues east concurrent with US 60 and SR 156 as a four-lane divided highway through a forested area that meets I-295 at a cloverleaf interchange. SR 156 splits south onto Elko Road, east of which the U.S. and state highways become a three-lane road with center turn lane. SR 33 and US 60 become a four-lane divided highway at Bottoms Bridge, where the highways cross the Chickahominy River into New Kent County. A short distance east of the river, SR 33 turns north onto four-lane divided New Kent Highway. SR 33 turns east onto I-64 at their partial cloverleaf interchange; the roadway continues northeast as SR 249. SR 33 runs concurrently with I-64 through interchanges with SR 106 (Emmaus Church Road) and SR 155 (Courthouse Road) before exiting I-64 at a trumpet interchange.

SR 33 heads northeast as Eltham Road, a four-lane divided highway that meets New Kent Highway at the hamlet of Angelview Church. New Kent Highway heads west as SR 249 and southeast as SR 30; the latter route joins SR 33. The two highways reduces to an undivided four-lane road and meet the northern end of SR 273 (Farmers Drive) in the village of Eltham. SR 33 and SR 30 cross the Pamunkey River on a high-level bascule bridge into the town of West Point. SR 33 passes through the town on 14th Street and has intersections with SR 296 (Kirby Street) and SR 298 (Lee Street) around its intersection with Main Street, where SR 30 turns north to become the main north–south highway of King William County. SR 33 leaves the town by crossing the Mattaponi River on a high-level fixed bridge.

=== West Point to Stingray Point ===
SR 33 becomes a divided highway again in Mattaponi just east of the river, then passes through Snow Hill and Shacklefords, where the highway becomes concurrent with SR 14 (The Trail), the main north–south highway of King and Queen County. The two highways split at Shacklefords Fork; from there, SR 33 continues east into Gloucester County as Lewis Puller Memorial Highway, named for the decorated United States Marine Corps officer Chesty Puller. At Glenns, the state highway turns north to run concurrently with US 17 (George Washington Memorial Highway); the roadway continues east as SR 198 (Glenns Road). The two highways cross Dragon Swamp, a tributary of the Piankatank River, into Middlesex County and diverge just south of Saluda. SR 33 runs concurrently with U.S. Route 17 Business on the two-lane Gloucester Road to the center of the unincorporated town, where the state highway turns east onto School Street.

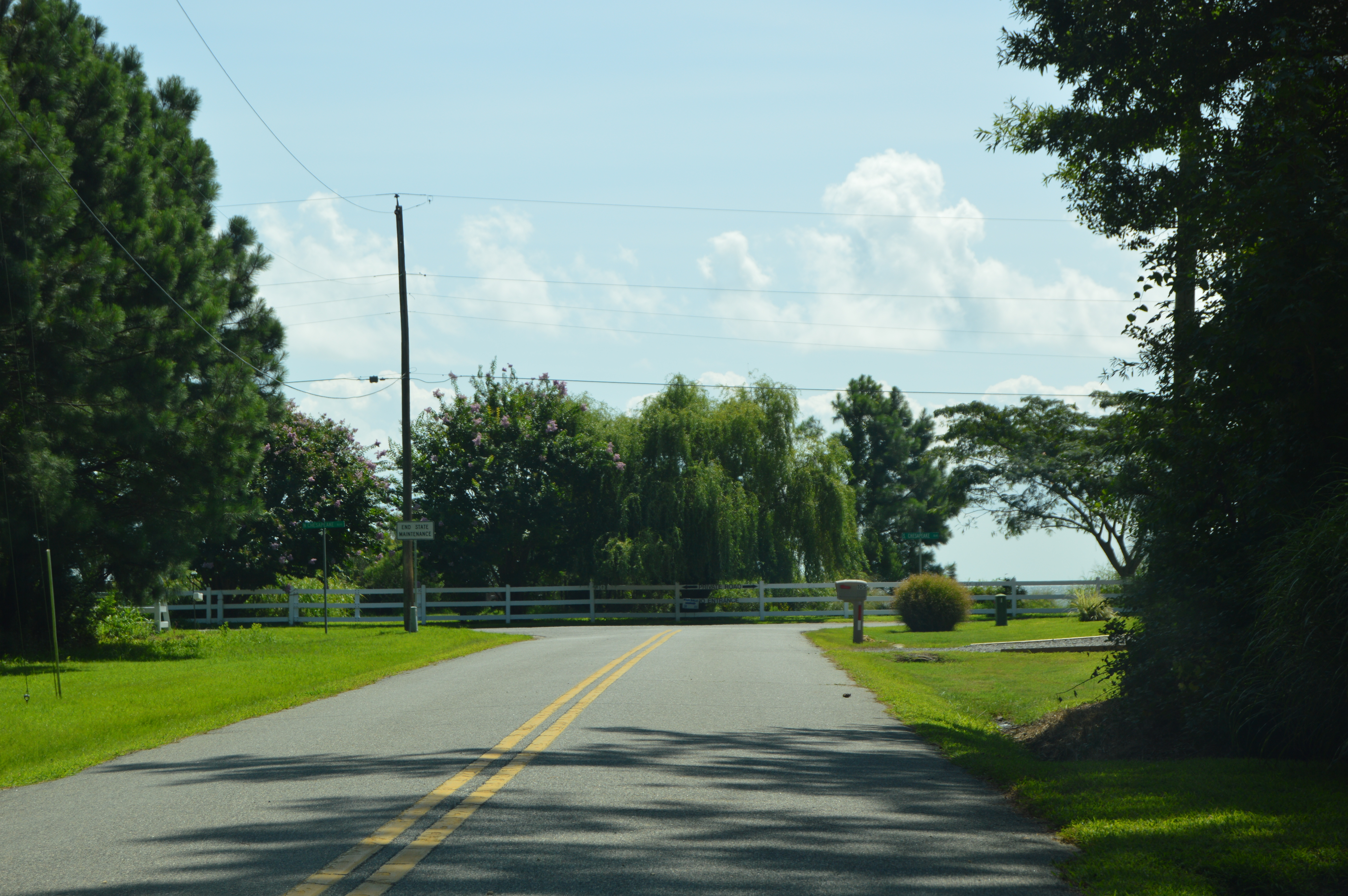
Eastern terminus at Stingray Point

At the east end of Saluda, SR 33 expands to a four-lane divided highway yet again and meets the southern end of SR 227 (Urbanna Road) at Cooks Corner. Just east of its intersection with SR 3 (Greys Point Road) in the community of Topping, SR 33 reduces to two lanes for the remainder of its course. SR 33 and SR 3 head southeast together to their split in Hartfield. SR 33 continues east through Deltaville to the eastern end of the peninsula between the Rappahannock and Piankatank Rivers at Stingray Point. At Pocahontas Avenue, SR 33 makes a right-angle turn southeast along a narrow road to its terminus at Chesapeake Boulevard on the shore of the Chesapeake Bay.

== History ==
SR 33 was part of State Route 4, which continued west along U.S. Route 33, until early 1938.

== Major intersections ==
County	Location	mi	km	Exit	Destinations	Notes
City of Richmond		0.00	0.00		US 33 west / US 250 (West Broad Street)	Western terminus
City of Richmond		0.58	0.93		US 1 / US 301 (North Belvidere Street) / to Chamberlayne Avenue	
City of Richmond					To 4th Street / I-95 / I-64	
City of Richmond				Leigh Street Viaduct over Shockoe Valley		
Henrico		3.81	6.13		I-64 to I-95 – Downtown Richmond	I-64 exit 193
Henrico	Highland Springs	8.67	13.95		SR 156 (Airport Road) to I-64 / I-295	
Henrico	Seven Pines	10.25	16.50		US 60 west / SR 156 north (East Williamsburg Road) – Richmond	west end of US 60 / SR 156 overlap
Henrico		11.63	18.72		I-295 to I-64 / I-95 – Washington, Rocky Mount, NC	I-295 exit 28
Henrico		13.87	22.32		SR 156 south (Elko Road)	east end of SR 156 overlap
New Kent	Bottoms Bridge	16.63	26.76		US 60 east (New Kent Highway) – Norfolk	east end of US 60 overlap; west end of SR 249 overlap
New Kent		16.85	27.12		I-64 west / SR 249 east (New Kent Highway) to I-295 – Quinton, New Kent, Richmond	east end of SR 249 overlap; west end of I-64 overlap; SR 33 west follows exit 205
New Kent		22.17	35.68	211	SR 106 – Talleysville, Roxbury	
New Kent		25.64	41.26	214	SR 155 – New Kent CH, Providence Forge	
New Kent		31.55	50.77		I-64 east – Norfolk	east end of I-64 overlap; SR 33 east follows exit 220
New Kent	Angelview Church				SR 30 south / SR 249 west (New Kent Highway) – New Kent, Williamsburg	west end of SR 30 overlap
New Kent	Eltham				SR 273 south (Farmers Drive) – Barhamsville	
Pamunkey River		38.96	62.70	Eltham Bridge		
King William	West Point				Kirby Street (SR 296)	
King William	West Point	39.21	63.10		SR 30 west / SR 1129 (Main Street) – King William CH, Fredericksburg, Mattaponi Indian Reservation, Pamunkey Indian Reservation	east end of SR 30 overlap
King William	West Point				SR 298 / SR 1101 (Lee Street)	
Mattaponi River		39.69	63.87	Lord Delaware Bridge		
King and Queen	Shacklefords	43.13	69.41		SR 14 west (The Trail) – King & Queen CH	west end of SR 14 overlap
King and Queen	Shacklefords Fork	44.79	72.08		SR 14 east (Buena Vista Road) – Adner, Gloucester, Mathews	east end of SR 14 overlap
Gloucester	Glenns				SR 374 north (College Drive) – Rappahannock Community College Glenns Campus	
Gloucester	Glenns	50.32	80.98		US 17 south (George Washington Memorial Highway) / SR 198 east (Glenns Road) – Mathews, Newport News, Gloucester	west end of US 17 overlap
Middlesex		52.68	84.78		US 17 north (Tidewater Trail) – Fredericksburg	east end of US 17 overlap; west end of US 17 Bus. overlap
Middlesex	Saluda	53.84	86.65		US 17 Bus. north (General Puller Highway) / SR 618 (Oakes Landing Road) – Fredericksburg	east end of US 17 Bus. overlap
Middlesex	Cooks Corner	55.26	88.93		SR 227 north (Urbanna Road) / SR 641 south (Old Courthouse Road) – Urbanna	
Middlesex	Harmony Village	60.37	97.16		SR 3 west (Grey's Point Road) – White Stone, Irvington, Kilmarnock, Airport	west end of SR 3 overlap
Middlesex	Hartfield	63.82	102.71		SR 3 east (Twigg's Ferry Road) – Gloucester, Mathews	east end of SR 3 overlap
Middlesex	Stingray Point	72.23	116.24		Chesapeake Boulevard	Eastern terminus
1.000 mi = 1.609 km; 1.000 km = 0.621 mi

< SR 392	Spurs of SR 39; 1923–1928	SR 394 >
< SR 428	District 4 State Routes; 1928–1933	SR 430 >
< SR 414	District 4 State Routes; 1928–1933	SR 416 >
< SR 602	District 6 State Routes; 1928–1933	SR 604 >
