= Snow Hill =

Snow Hill, Snowhill, or Snowshill may refer to the following places:

== Antarctica ==
- Snow Hill Island
- Snow Hills, Signy Island

== United Kingdom ==
- Snowhill, a development project in Birmingham city centre
- Birmingham Snow Hill railway station
  - Snow Hill lines, running through the station
  - Snow Hill tunnel (Birmingham)
- Snow Hill, London, in the City of London
  - Snow Hill tunnel (London)
  - Snow Hill railway station (London), part of Holborn Viaduct station, closed in 1916
- Snowshill, Gloucestershire
- Snow Hill, Windsor Great Park, Berkshire

== United States ==
- Snow Hill, Alabama
- Snow Hill (Connecticut)
- Snow Hill, Iowa, an extinct hamlet in Page County
- Snow Hill, Miami County, Indiana
- Snow Hill, Randolph County, Indiana
- Snow Hill (Little Rock, Kentucky)
- Snow Hill, Maryland
- Snow Hill (Laurel, Maryland), a house
- Snow Hill Site, Port Deposit, Maryland, an archeological site
- Snow Hill Township, Lincoln County, Missouri
- Snow Hill, North Carolina, a town in Greene County
  - Snow Hill Historic District
- Snow Hill, Ohio
- Snow Hill, Texas
- Snow Hill, Virginia
- Snow Hill (Gwaltney Corner, Virginia), a house
- Snow Hill, Kanawha County, West Virginia
- Snow Hill, Nicholas County, West Virginia

== See also ==
- Snow Hill railway station (disambiguation)
