= Mattaponi, Virginia =

Unincorporated community in Virginia, United States

- Unincorporated community
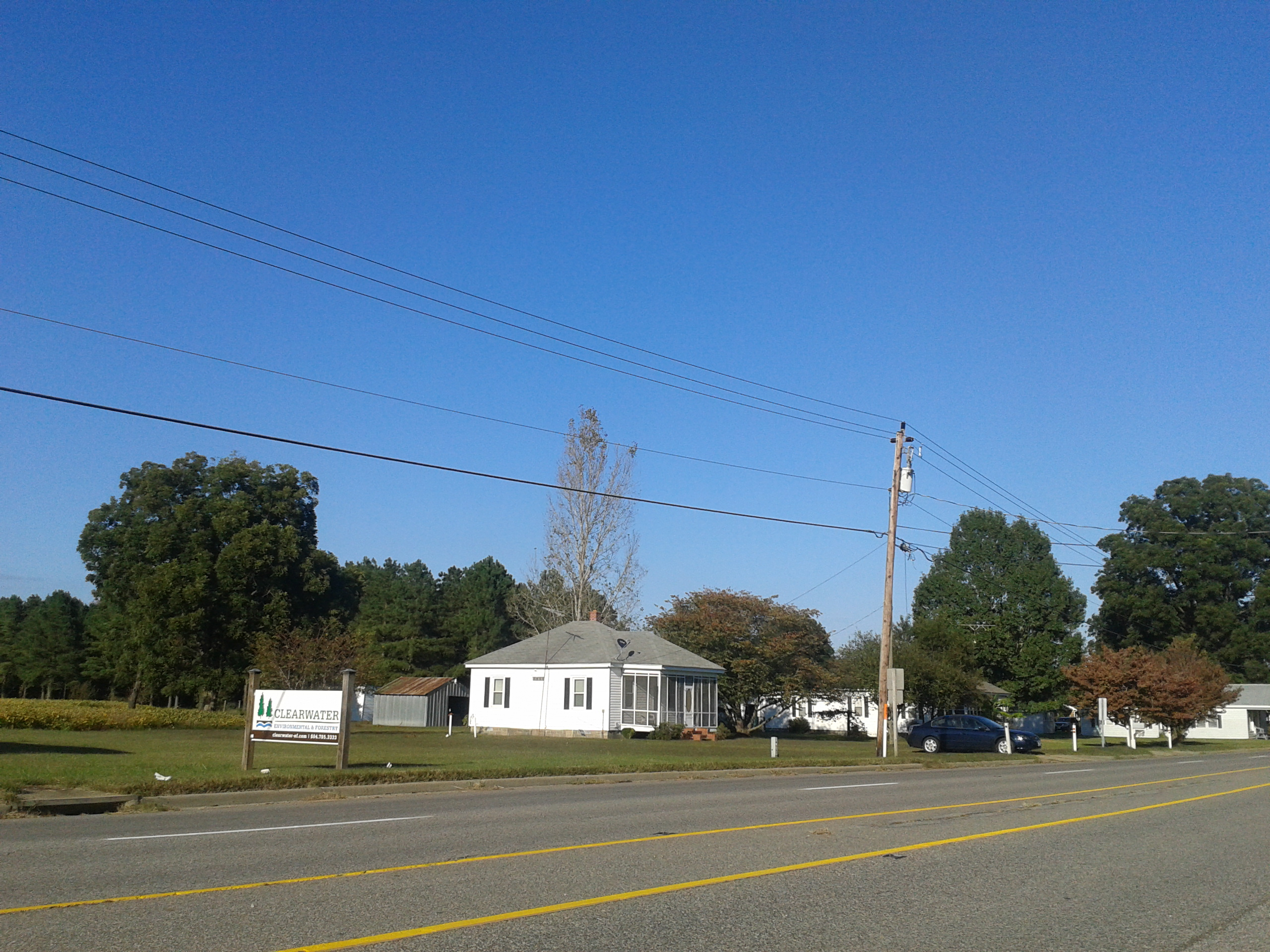
- Mattaponi, October, 2016

- Location within the Commonwealth of Virginia Mattaponi (the United States)
- Coordinates: 37°32′06″N 76°46′22″W
- Country: United States
- State: Virginia
- County: King and Queen
- Time zone: UTC−5 (Eastern (EST))
  - Summer (DST): UTC−4 (EDT)

Mattaponi is an unincorporated community in King and Queen County, Virginia, United States. The main roads in Mattaponi are SR 33 and SR 605.

== Etymology ==
The town is named after the Mattaponi tribe, which has a reservation in the state.
