= Stingray Point, Virginia =

Community in Virginia, US

Coordinates: 37°33′31″N 76°18′19″W

Stingray Point is an unincorporated community on the Chesapeake Bay near the village of Deltaville in Middlesex County, Virginia, United States. It is located at the eastern terminus of State Route 33. The community is populated by fewer than 250 full-time residents; however, during summer months that population surges as tourists and vacationers flock to Deltaville for recreation on the bay. Most of the houses on Stingray Point are cottages and weekend homes. Stingray Point is also home to Stingray Point Marina, one of the Deltaville area's many marinas.

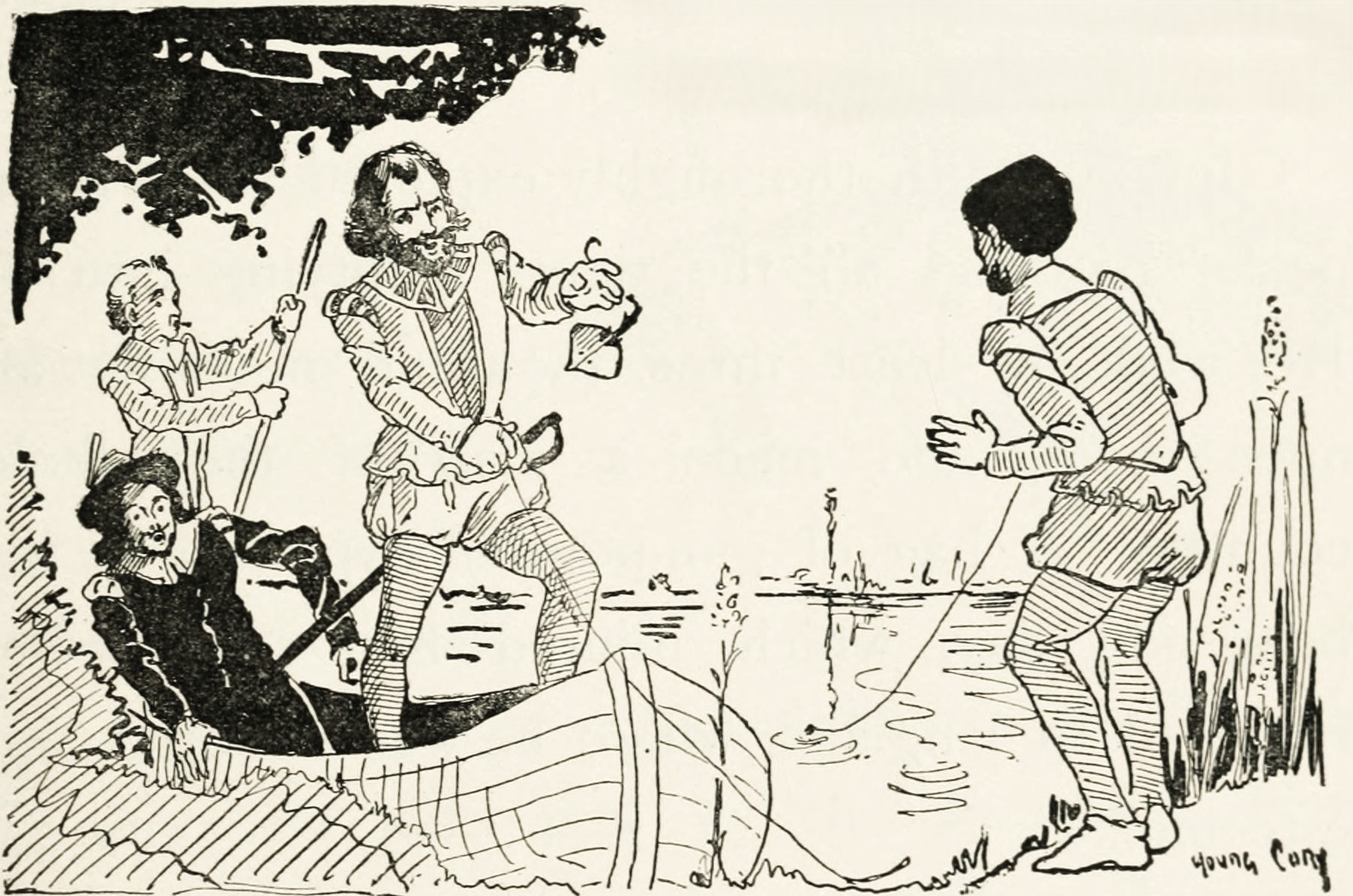
Captain Smith stung by the "fish" (stingray)

Stingray Point derives its name from the 17th century, when Captain John Smith was stung while fishing with his men off a shoal near the point by a stingray, either an Atlantic stingray, a Cownose ray, or a Dasyatis sp. Smith was seriously injured by the sting, and even gave orders to his men as to the disposal of his body should he perish. Treated with hot compresses, he recovered well enough by evening that he dined on the ray.

Local legend records that he was saved by a mudpack derived from mud found at a nearby creek and administered by a native medicine man; the creek has since been known as Antipoison Creek.
