= Virginia State Route 156 =

State highway in eastern Virginia, US

State Route 156

Route information
- Maintained by VDOT
- Length: 57.38 mi (92.34 km)
- Existed: July 1, 1933–present

Major junctions
- South end: US 301 / SR 35 at Templeton
- US 460 near Disputanta; SR 106 near Prince George; SR 10 near Jordan Point; SR 5 / SR 106 at Kimages; US 60 in Sandston; I-64 in Sandston; SR 33 in Highland Springs; I-295 near Highland Springs; US 360 in Mechanicsville
- North end: US 360 Bus. / SR 638 in Mechanicsville

Location
- Country: United States
- State: Virginia
- Counties: Prince George, Charles City, Henrico, Hanover

Highway system
- Virginia Routes; Interstate; US; Primary; Secondary; Byways; History; HOT lanes
← SR 155	→ SR 157

State Route 156 (SR 156) is a primary state highway in the U.S. state of Virginia. The state highway runs 57.38 miles (92.34 km) from U.S. Route 301 (US 301) and SR 35 in Templeton north to US 360 Business in Mechanicsville. SR 156 follows a circuitous route through the eastern part of the Richmond–Petersburg metropolitan area. South of the James River, the state highway connects Templeton in Prince George County with Hopewell, which is directly served by SR 156 Business. SR 156 crosses the James River on the Benjamin Harrison Memorial Bridge and briefly passes through Charles City County. For most of its length in Henrico and Hanover, the state highway is a rural road that provides access to several units of Richmond National Battlefield Park. However, SR 156 provides access to Richmond International Airport, Interstate 64 (I-64), and I-295 as it passes through the Richmond suburbs of Sandston and Highland Springs as a major highway.

== Route description ==
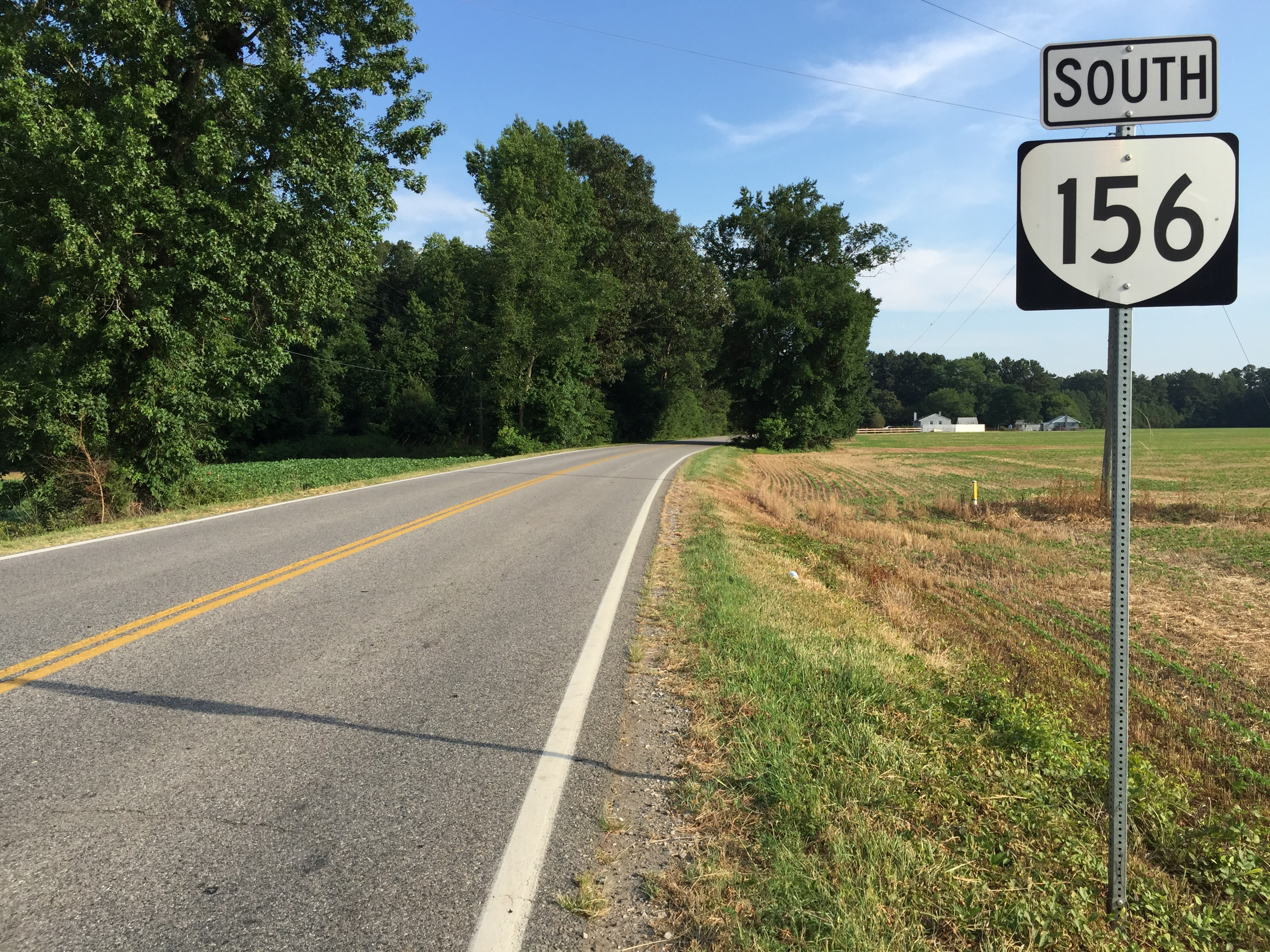
View south along SR 156 at SR 106 in Prince George

SR 156 begins at a four-way intersection with US 301 and SR 35 (Courtland Road) in Templeton. The south leg of the intersection is an exit ramp from northbound I-95. US 301 and SR 35 head west along Courtland Road to provide access to the remaining ramps of the highways' diamond interchange with I-95. SR 35 heads east along Courtland Road toward Courtland. SR 156 and US 301 run concurrently north along Prince George Drive before US 301 splits northwest to follow Crater Road toward Petersburg. SR 156 continues northeast along two-lane undivided Prince George Drive toward its junction with US 460 (County Drive) northwest of Disputanta, which occurs just after the state highway crosses Norfolk Southern Railway's Norfolk District. The state highway continues north to the community of Prince George, the county seat of Prince George County, where the highway has a four-way intersection with SR 106 (Courthouse Road) and SR 156 Business (Prince George Drive). SR 106 heads southwest toward the county office complex, SR 156 Business heads north to serve Hopewell, and SR 156 and SR 106 head northeast along Ruffin Road to bypass Hopewell.

SR 156 and SR 106 follow Ruffin Road to SR 10 (James River Drive); this intersection is also the northern end of SR 156 Business. The two highways turn east to run concurrently with the four-lane divided highway to its next intersection with Jordan Point Road. SR 156 and SR 106 turn north onto two-lane undivided Jordan Point Road, which leads to Jordan Point. The two highways cross the James River on the Benjamin Harrison Memorial Bridge, a vertical-lift bridge that is named for Benjamin Harrison V, the father of William Henry Harrison and great-grandfather of Benjamin Harrison. The two highways enter Charles City County as Roxbury Road, which they follow north to SR 5 (John Tyler Memorial Highway) at Kimages. SR 5 heads east toward Charles City, SR 106 continues north along Roxbury Road toward Roxbury, and SR 156 turns west to join SR 5 in a concurrency.

SR 156 and SR 5 initially head west but curve north and pass by Shirley Plantation, one of the James River plantations. The two highways pass through the hamlet of Granville, which lies on the James River opposite Turkey Island, which is formed by a bend in the river that encloses Presquile National Wildlife Refuge. Just north of Granville, SR 156 and SR 5 cross Turkey Island Creek into Henrico County, where the highways follow New Market Road until SR 156 turns northeast onto Willis Church Road. At Carters Mill Road, SR 156 makes a right-angle turn north just before passing through the Malvern Hill unit of Richmond National Battlefield Park. The state highway passes Glendale National Cemetery and the Glendale unit of the battlefield park before reaching a four-way intersection with Charles City Road and Darbytown Road, where SR 156 makes a right-angle turn to the east onto Charles City Road. SR 156 follows Charles City Road to Elko Road, onto which the highway turns north to cross the White Oak Swamp and intersect CSX's Peninsula Subdivision in the hamlet of Elko. The state highway passes scattered residential subdivisions as it follows the eastern edge of the Elko Tract, part of which is an industrial park accessed via SR 380 (Elko Tract Road).

North of the Elko Tract, SR 156 turns west and joins US 60 and SR 33 on Williamsburg Road, a four-lane divided highway. The three highways meet I-295 at a cloverleaf interchange and enter the community of Sandston, through which the highways pass as a two-lane undivided road. SR 33 turns north onto Nine Mile Road next to Seven Pines National Cemetery. SR 156 and US 60 expand to a four-lane divided highway again as they begin to follow the northern edge of the Richmond International Airport property. SR 156 and US 60 diverge at Airport Drive, which heads south into the airport and north as part of SR 156. The four-lane divided highway has a cloverleaf interchange with I-64 and, just to the north, intersects Norfolk Southern Railway's Richmond District at grade. SR 156 continues northeast through the community of Highland Springs, where it intersects SR 33 (Nine Mile Road) again. SR 156 has another cloverleaf interchange with I-295. East of the Interstate at Old Hanover Road, the state highway reduces to two lanes and briefly becomes Hanover Road before crossing the Chickahominy River into Hanover County.

SR 156 continues north as Cold Harbor Road, which makes a right-angle turn west at SR 619 (Rockhill Road) to pass by the Gaines' Mill and Cold Harbor units of Richmond National Battlefield Park. After intersecting SR 615 (Creighton Road), which provides access to I-295, the state highway enters a suburban area where the highway makes another right-angle turn west at SR 636 (Walnut Grove Road) and SR 643 (Lee Davis Road). SR 156 crosses over I-295 with no access and passes by the Beaver Dam Creek unit of the battlefield park before entering Mechanicsville. The state highway has a three-quarter diamond interchange with US 360 (Mechanicsville Bypass) just before reaching its northern terminus at US 360 Business (Mechanicsville Turnpike), which completes the missing westbound US 360 to SR 156 movement of the interchange. The road continues northwest as SR 638 (Atlee Road).

== Major intersections ==
County	Location	mi	km	Destinations	Notes
Prince George	Templeton	0.17	0.27	US 301 (South Crater Road) / SR 668 (Prince George Drive) to I-95 / SR 35 – Petersburg, Courtland, Emporia	Southern terminus
Prince George	Disputanta	7.33	11.80	US 460 (County Drive) – Petersburg, Suffolk	
Prince George		13.06	21.02	SR 106 south (Courthouse Road) / SR 156 Bus. north (Prince George Drive) to I-95 / I-295 – Hopewell, Prince George	South end of concurrency with SR 106
Prince George		17.62	28.36	SR 10 west / SR 156 Bus. south (James River Drive) / SR 644 (Ruffin Road) – Hopewell	South end of concurrency with SR 10
Prince George		18.35	29.53	SR 10 east (James River Drive) – Suffolk	North end of concurrency with SR 10
James River		21.04	33.86	Benjamin Harrison Memorial Bridge	
Charles City		22.35	35.97	SR 5 east (John Tyler Memorial Highway) / SR 106 north (Roxbury Road) – Williamsburg	North end of concurrency with SR 106; south end of concurrency with SR 5
Henrico		28.41	45.72	SR 5 west (New Market Road) – Richmond	North end of concurrency with SR 5
Henrico		37.70	60.67	SR 380 (Elko Tract Road)	
Henrico		38.24	61.54	US 60 east / SR 33 east (Williamsburg Road)	South end of concurrency with US 60 and SR 33
Henrico		40.48	65.15	I-295 to I-64 / I-95 – Rocky Mount, NC, Washington	Exit 28 (I-295)
Henrico	Seven Pines	41.88	67.40	SR 33 west (East Nine Mile Road) – Highland Springs	North end of concurrency with SR 33
Henrico	Sandston	43.36	69.78	US 60 west (Williamsburg Road) / Airport Drive – Richmond International Airport, Virginia Aviation Museum	North end of concurrency with US 60
Henrico		43.90	70.65	I-64 to I-95 / I-295 south – Richmond, Norfolk, Rocky Mount, NC	Exit 197 (I-64)
Henrico	Highland Springs	44.66	71.87	SR 33 (East Nine Mile Road)	Exit 193 (I-64)
Henrico		46.52	74.87	I-295 to I-64 / I-95 north – Charlottesville, Washington, Norfolk, Rocky Mount, NC	Exit 31 (I-295)
Hanover	Mechanicsville	57.26	92.15	US 360 to I-295 – Richmond, Tappahannock	Diamond interchange; no direct access from westbound US 360 to SR 156
Hanover	Mechanicsville	57.38	92.34	US 360 Bus. (Mechanicsville Turnpike) / SR 638 (Atlee Road)	Northern terminus
1.000 mi = 1.609 km; 1.000 km = 0.621 mi: Concurrency terminus; Incomplete access

== Bannered route ==
=== Hopewell business route ===
State Route 156 Business
- Location: Hopewell
- Length: 8.10 mi (13.04 km)

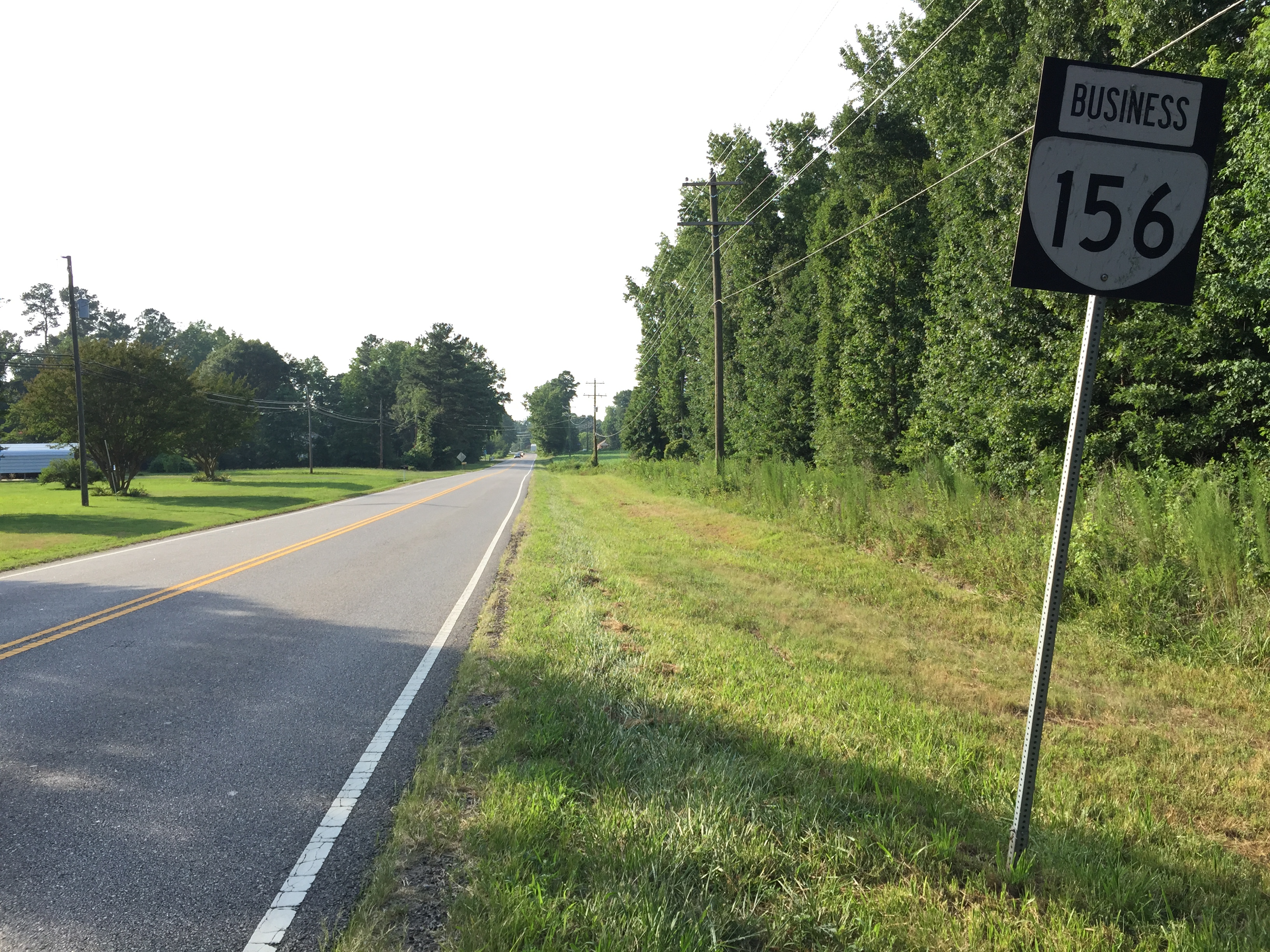
View north along SR 156 Bus. at SR 109 in Prince George

Virginia State Route 156 Business (SR 156 Business) is a business route of SR 156 through the independent city of Hopewell. The highway runs 8.10 miles (13.04 km) from SR 156 and SR 106 in Prince George north to SR 156, SR 10, and SR 106 near Jordan Point. SR 156 Business begins as Prince George Drive, which heads northwest as a two-lane undivided road from the SR 156–SR 106 junction and enters the city of Hopewell by crossing Bailey Creek. The highway enters the city as Arlington Road, which immediately expands to four lanes. When Arlington Road splits to the north, SR 156 Business continues on High Street to SR 36 (Winston Churchill Drive). The business route turns northeast onto the four-lane divided highway and runs concurrently with SR 36 until that highway turns onto Arlington Road to head toward downtown Hopewell. SR 156 Business intersects several rail spurs as the highway enters an industrial area. Within the industrial area, the business route intersects SR 10 (Randolph Road). SR 156 Business and SR 10 run concurrently east out of the industrial area. The highways leave the city of Hopewell by crossing Bailey Creek again before the business route reaches its northern terminus at the intersection between SR 156, SR 10, and SR 106.

< SR 413	District 4 State Routes; 1928–1933	SR 415 >
