= Diamond lane =

Type of lane on a street or highway

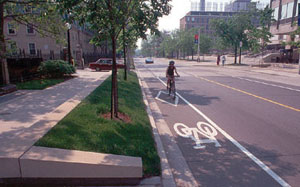
A rider in a bicycle diamond lane

In the US and Canada, a diamond lane is a special lane on a street or highway that is reserved for specific types of traffic. These lanes are usually marked with white diamonds or lozenges, and hence their name. Diamond lanes are generally the right-most or left-most lane on the road. They are usually implemented to provide ways through traffic congestion, for safety reasons, and to encourage environmentally friendly transportation. A diamond lane may be intended for a specific type of traffic, or for several types. The intended use of a diamond lane is marked by traffic signs. In most areas, violating the rules of a diamond lane is punishable by a fine.

Some common examples are:

- High-occupancy vehicle lane (HOV), also known as a carpool lane. These are typically freeway lanes intended for multiple occupant or "green vehicles" (such as hybrid or electric cars).
- Bike lane, sometimes referred to as segregated cycle facilities. Separating bicycle traffic from pedestrian or motor vehicle traffic is typically safer and improves traffic flow.
- Bus lane, an uncongested lane for buses to travel, load, or unload in.
- Emergency vehicle lane, to help emergency vehicles get to their destination as fast as possible while avoiding traffic congestion.
- Taxicab lanes, most often found at airports or other transit hubs for passenger loading and unloading.
- Horse and buggy lanes in areas with significant Amish populations

In some cases, these lanes may serve multiple functions. For example, a diamond lane may be designated for buses, bicycles, and right turns.

In mainland China, diamond sign can also be used as a pedestrian crossing advance warning line to warn the traffic that there is a pedestrian cross ahead.

In the US, the Federal Highway Administration's Manual on Uniform Traffic Control Devices states that diamonds indicates a lane reserved for high-occupancy vehicles.

== See also ==
- Reversible lane
- Local lane
- Bike lane debate
