= Snow Hill railway station (disambiguation) =

Birmingham Snow Hill railway station is in Birmingham City Centre, England.

Snow Hill railway station may also refer to:

- Holborn Viaduct railway station, formerly in London, part of which was previously known as Snow Hill
  - Snow Hill tunnel (London)
- St Helier railway station (Jersey Eastern Railway), a former railway station in the Channel Islands, originally known as St. Helier (Snow Hill)
