= Cliftondale Park, Virginia =

Unincorporated community in Virginia, United States

Coordinates: 37°49′24″N 79°47′55″W

- Census-designated place
- Location within Virginia Location within the United States
- Country: United States
- State: Virginia
- Counties: Alleghany
- Elevation: 1,122 ft (342 m)

Population (2020)
  - Total: 266
- Time zone: UTC-5 (Eastern (EST))
  - Summer (DST): UTC-4 (EDT)
- Area code: 540
- GNIS feature ID: 2807401

Cliftondale Park is an unincorporated community and census-designated place in Alleghany County, Virginia, United States. It was first listed as a CDP in the 2020 census with a population of 266.

== Demographics ==
Cliftondale Park first appeared as a census designated place in the 2020 U.S. census.
