= Snow Hill, Nicholas County, West Virginia =

Snow Hill, West Virginia
- Unincorporated community
- Location within West Virginia Location within the United States
- Coordinates: 38°08′07″N 80°46′53″W
- Country: United States
- State: West Virginia
- County: Nicholas
- Elevation: 2,690 ft (820 m)
- Time zone: UTC-5 (Eastern (EST))
  - Summer (DST): UTC-4 (EDT)
- Area codes: 304 & 681
- GNIS feature ID: 1555655

Snow Hill is an unincorporated community in Nicholas County, West Virginia, United States. Snow Hill is 10.5 miles (16.9 km) south-southeast of Summersville.

The community was descriptively named on account of a nearby snowy hill.
