= St. Peter's Church (Talleysville, Virginia) =

Historic church in Virginia, US

- U.S. National Register of Historic Places
- U.S. National Historic Landmark
- Virginia Landmarks Register
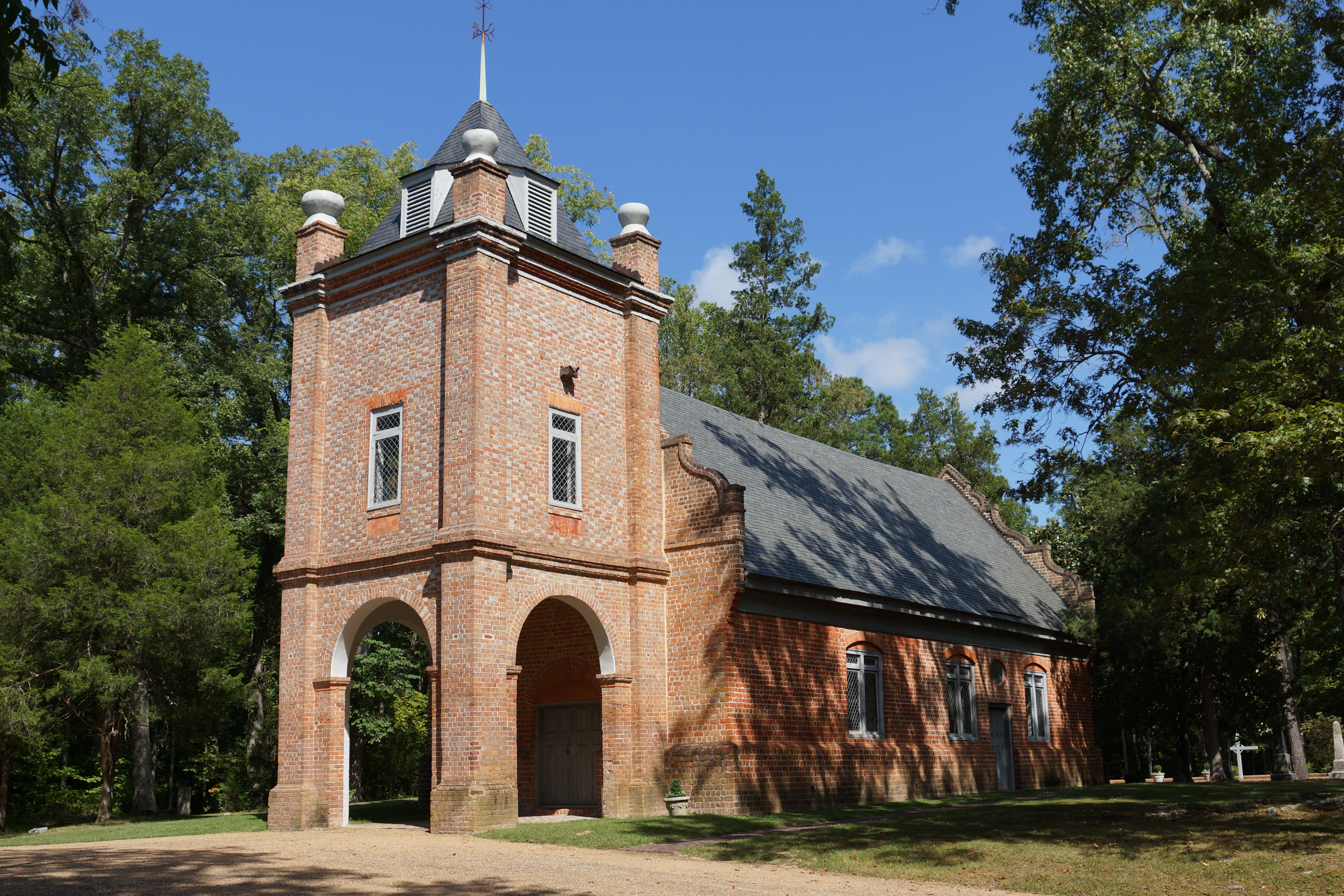
- St. Peter's Church

- Location within Virginia
- Location: 8400 Saint Peters Lane; Talleysville, Virginia 23124 (New Kent mailing address)
- Coordinates: 37°32′24″N 77°03′24″W
- Built: 1703
- NRHP reference No.: 69000263
- VLR No.: 063-0027

Significant dates
- Added to NRHP: October 1, 1969
- Designated NHL: March 2, 2012
- Designated VLR: November 5, 1968

St. Peter's Episcopal Church is an historic Episcopal church located at 8400 St Peters Lane in New Kent, Virginia 23124, nearby but not in Talleysville, Virginia, United States. Built in 1703, the church was designated as "The First Church of the First First-Lady" by the Virginia General Assembly in 1960 and added to the National Register of Historic Places in 1969. It was designated a National Historic Landmark on March 2, 2012, as an exceptionally well-preserved colonial-era church.

== History ==
St. Peter's Church was established in New Kent County, Virginia, on April 29, 1679. Construction began in 1701 (at a cost of 146,000 weight of tobacco) and was complete by 1703. The steeple was erected 12 years later. The builder of nearby Foster's Castle, Colonel Joseph Foster, was a vestryman and supervised construction at St. Peter's Church.

Another vestryman, Colonel Daniel Parke Custis, married Martha Dandridge on May 15, 1750, according to the groom as he wrote it in his own bible. Martha D. Custis became a widow after only eight years of marriage. On January 6, 1759, the Rector of St. Peter's, Rev. David Mossom, united Martha Custis and Colonel George Washington in marriage. Debate ensues over the exact location of the marriage; some believe it occurred within the church while others believe it took place a few miles away at the White House Plantation on the Pamunkey River.

Following the American Revolution and disestablishment of what had become the Episcopal Church and confiscation of vacant glebes in 1802 legislation, this church was abandoned and fell into disrepair. Sometime around 1820, Presbyterians started worshiping at the church. Episcopalian services began again in 1843. Both denominations shared the church, alternating weeks, until 1865.

Because of its central location in New Kent County about 30 miles from Richmond, the church suffered greatly during the Civil War, and most of its records predating the conflict were lost. Union soldiers stabled their horses in the pews and carved their names in the brick exterior. On October 23, 1869 General Robert E. Lee wrote "St. Peters is the church where General Washington was married and attended in early life. It would be a shame to America if allowed to go to destruction." His son, General William Henry Fitzhugh Lee oversaw the partial restoration in 1872.

After being designated as "The First Church of the First First-Lady" by the Virginia General Assembly in 1960, restoration again began on the church with the assistance of architectural and ecclesiastic experts. The renovation included structural improvements to the church which required completely gutting the interior.

== Architecture ==
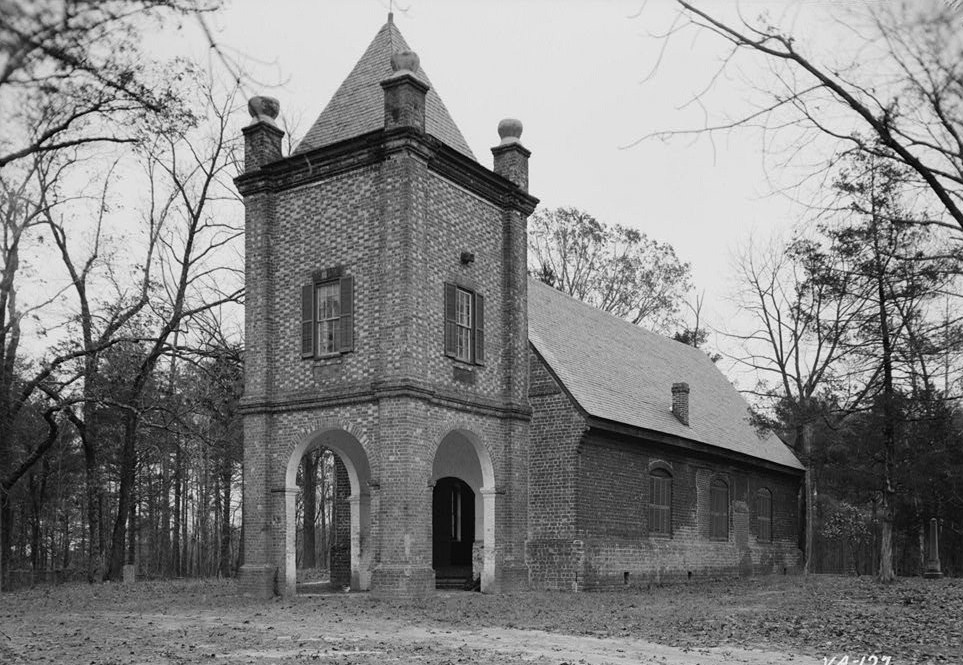
HABS photograph of the church, date unknown

Constructed of brick laid in Flemish bond, St. Peter's measures 64 feet 4 inches (19.61 m) by 28 feet 4.5 inches (8.649 m) and is one story high. The gable roof has curvilinear gable ends; segmental arches appear over the windows of the church and the open arches of the tower which was added in the mid-eighteenth century replacing an earlier wooden belfry. The two-story brick tower is of Flemish bond with some glazing and has a pyramidal roof. The top of the tower is also decorated by four original stuccoed brick urns. A wing was added sometime before the Revolution but was removed in the middle of the nineteenth century.

The original south doorway and several windows had been bricked up but have been restored as have the curvilinear gable ends for which evidence was found in the fabric of the building during the 1940s and again during the restoration work of 1951-52. Much of the interior and exterior has been restored or replaced in what is thought to be its original condition.

== See also ==
- List of National Historic Landmarks in Virginia
- List of the oldest buildings in Virginia
- National Register of Historic Places listings in New Kent County, Virginia
