= Interstate 295 (Virginia) =

Highway in Virginia

Interstate 295
- I-295 highlighted in red

Route information
- Auxiliary route of I-95
- Maintained by VDOT
- Length: 52.56 mi (84.59 km)
- Existed: Oct 1980–present
- NHS: Entire route

Major junctions
- South end: I-95 near Petersburg
- SR 895 Toll near Varina; I-64 / US 60 near Highland Springs; US 360 near Mechanicsville; US 301 / SR 2 near Mechanicsville; I-95 / US 1 near Glen Allen; US 33 near Glen Allen
- North end: I-64 near Short Pump

Location
- Country: United States
- State: Virginia
- Counties: Prince George, City of Hopewell, Chesterfield, Henrico, Hanover

Highway system
- Interstate Highway System; Main; Auxiliary; Suffixed; Business; Future; Virginia Routes; Interstate; US; Primary; Secondary; Byways; History; HOT lanes
| ← SR 294 | → SR 296 |

Interstate 295 (I-295) is a highway which runs eastward and northward bypass of the cities of Richmond and Petersburg in the US state of Virginia. The southern terminus is an interchange with I-95 southeast of Petersburg. I-295 then has an interchange with I-64 east of Richmond, crosses I-95 north of Richmond, and continues westward to its other terminus at a second interchange with I-64.

== Route description ==
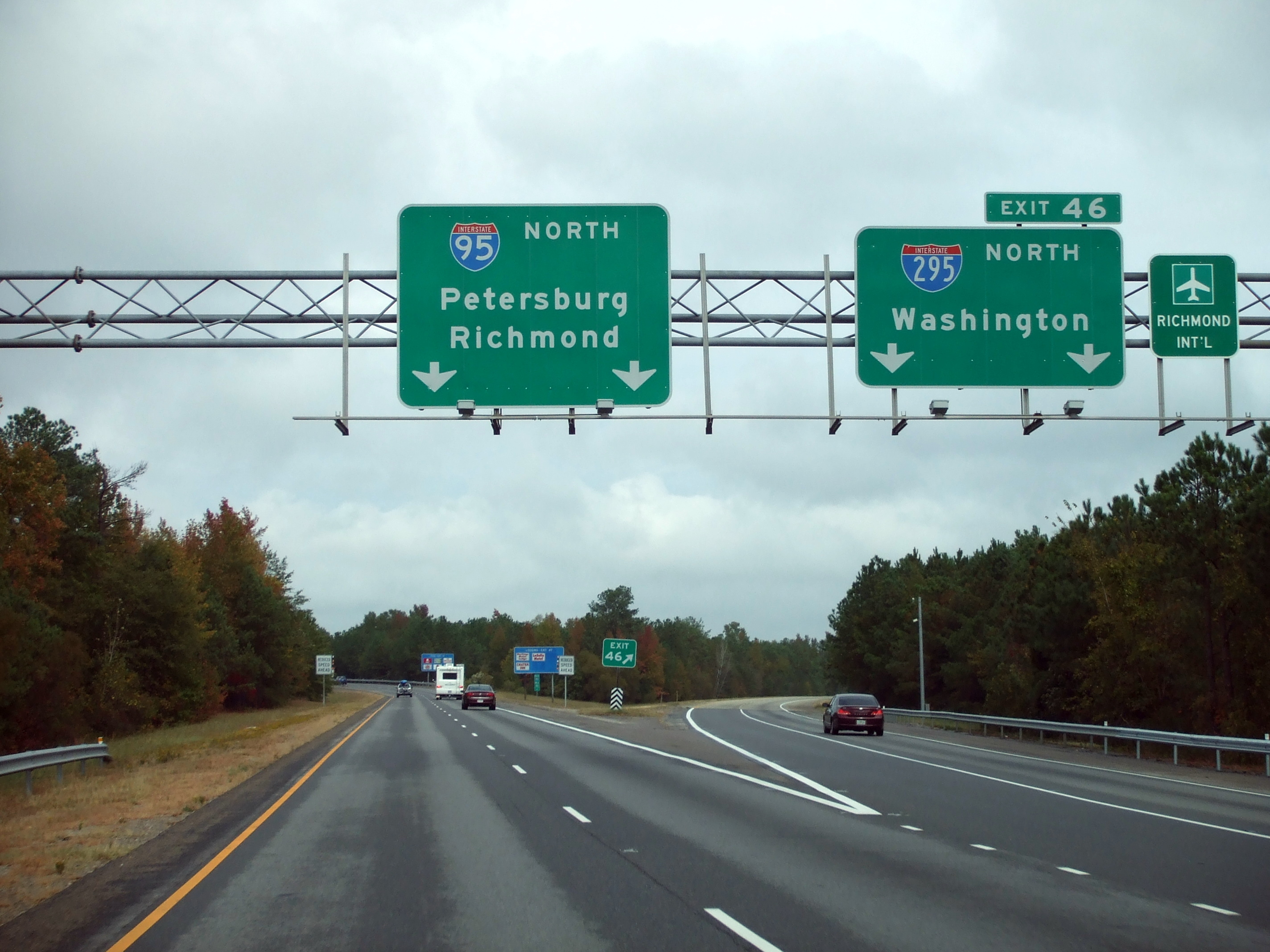
I-295 as it begins at northbound I-95 south of Petersburg

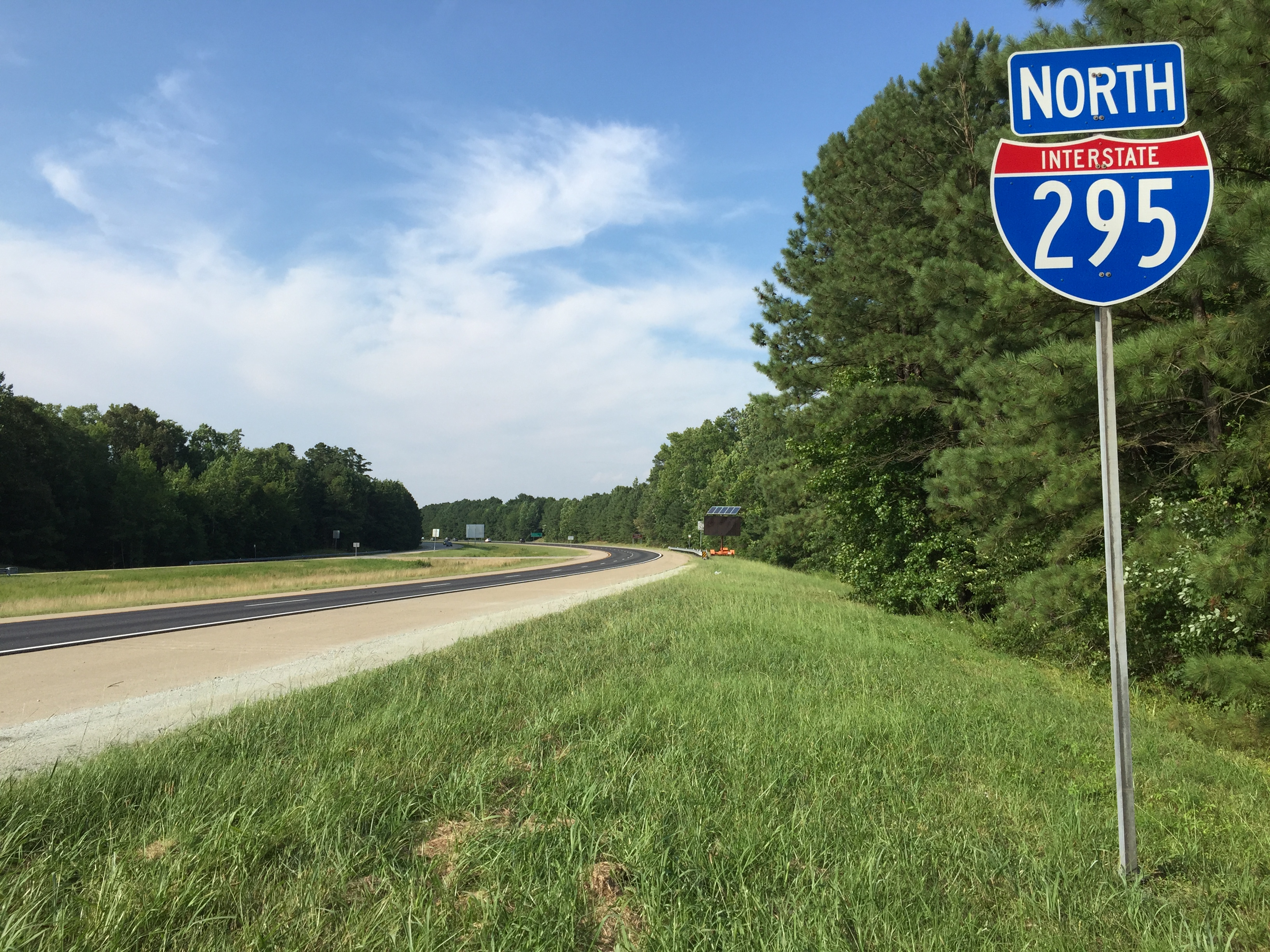
View north along I-295 just north of I-95 near Petersburg

I-295 serves as a bypass route around downtown Richmond for both I-64 and I-95. It also performs crossover duty for travelers between Washington DC (reached by I-95) and southeastern Virginia (reached by I-64) and links many of Richmond's suburbs (such as Short Pump, Mechanicsville, Highland Springs, Varina, and Hopewell). Much of the highway has a posted speed limit of 70 mph (110 km/h).

The highway begins at I-95 exit 46, south of Petersburg in unincorporated Prince George County with two lanes in each direction. Exit 3 provides access to US Route 460 (US 460), the most direct route from Petersburg to the Hampton Roads area. At exit 9 (State Route 36 [SR 36]), the road widens to three lanes in each direction. Exit 15 provides access to SR 10, a major arterial that connects Hopewell to Hampton Roads. Exit 16 provides access to the Meadowville Technology Parkway immediately before the road crosses the James River on the Varina-Enon Bridge, built in 1990 and the second major cable-stayed bridge in the US. Exit 22 provides access to SR 5, a mostly scenic route between Richmond and Williamsburg. Exit 25 is for SR 895, a short toll connector to I-95 that also provides access to Richmond International Airport. The massive exit 28 provides access to both I-64 and US 60. The exit complex features two-lane collector–distributor lanes and runs longer than one mile (1.6 km).

North of exit 28, the road widens to four lanes in each direction and bends to the northwest. Exit 31 is for SR 156 and northern access to Richmond International Airport. Exit 34 is for a local road, Creighton Road (SR 615). Exit 37 provides access to US 360. Exit 38 is for SR 627, which carries the local names Pole Green and Meadowbridge roads. Exit 41 is for US 301 and SR 2. Another large interchange complex (exit 43) marks the junction with both I-95 and US 1. The road reduces again to three lanes as it bends slightly to the southwest. Exit 45 is for Woodman Road, exit 49 is for US 33, and exit 51 is for Nuckols Road. I-295's northern terminus is at exit 53 with I-64. The northernmost 10 miles (16 km) of the route are not signed with directional signs, as the compass direction of the route is slightly southwest–northeast, in contravention of the nominal direction of the rest of the route.

All of the exits are cloverleafs with the exceptions of: its southern terminus I-95 (exit 1), Meadowville Technology Parkway (exit 16), SR 895 (exit 25), and the northern terminus with I-64 (exit 53).

Additionally, as the road's primary purpose is to direct long-distance travel away from Downtown Richmond, control cities on guide signs for the road include cities such as Washington DC, Charlottesville, and Rocky Mount, North Carolina, as destinations. However, the highway goes to none of those cities, but instead uses such destinations to direct long-distance travelers away from the congested areas in Downtown Richmond and Petersburg. In the 1990s, Miami, Florida, was also listed as a control city on some guide signs north of Richmond, but these have been removed or changed.

== Exit list ==
| County | Location | mi | km | Exit | Destinations | Notes |
|---|---|---|---|---|---|---|
| Prince George | | 0.00 | 0.00 | | I-95 south – Emporia, Rocky Mount, NC | Southern terminus; southbound exit and northbound entrance; I-95 exit 46 |
| Prince George | | 0.00 | 0.00 | 1 | I-95 north to I-85 – Petersburg | Southbound exit and northbound entrance; I-95 exit 46 |
| Prince George | New Bohemia | 2.50 | 4.02 | 3 | US 460 – Petersburg, Norfolk | Signed as exits 3A (east) and 3B (west) |
| City of Hopewell | | 9.04 | 14.55 | 9 | SR 36 – Fort Gregg-Adams, Colonial Heights, Petersburg, Hopewell | Signed as exits 9A (east) and 9B (west) |
| Chesterfield | Chester | 14.84 | 23.88 | 15 | SR 10 to I-95 – Chester, Hopewell | Signed as exits 15A (east) and 15B (west) |
| Chesterfield | Meadowville | 16.16 | 26.01 | 16 | SR 618 (Rivers Bend Boulevard) / Meadowville Technology Parkway | |
| James River | | 17.45– 17.62 | 28.08– 28.36 | Varina-Enon Bridge | | |
| Henrico | Varina Grove | 21.67 | 34.87 | 22 | SR 5 – Varina, Charles City | Signed as exits 22A (east) and 22B (west) |
| Henrico | | 24.60 | 39.59 | 25 | SR 895 Toll west to I-95 – Richmond, Richmond International Airport | |
| Henrico | | 27.70– 28.51 | 44.58– 45.88 | 28 | I-64 / US 60 – Richmond, Norfolk, Virginia Beach, Richmond International Airport, Seven Pines, Bottoms Bridge | Access from southbound I-295 to eastbound I-64 via both cloverleaf ramp and additional flyover ramp; signed as exits 28A (I-64 east) and 28B (I-64 west / US 60) southbound; I-64 exit 200 |
| Henrico | | 30.67 | 49.36 | 31 | SR 156 – Highland Springs, Cold Harbor, Richmond International Airport | Signed as exits 31A (north) and 31B (south) |
| Hanover | | 33.96 | 54.65 | 34 | SR 615 (Creighton Road) | Signed as exits 34A (east) and 34B (west) |
| Hanover | Mechanicsville | 36.51 | 58.76 | 37 | US 360 – Mechanicsville, Tappahannock | Signed as exits 37A (east) and 37B (west) |
| Hanover | Mechanicsville | 38.15 | 61.40 | 38 | SR 627 (Meadowbridge Road / Pole Green Road) | Signed as exits 38A (east) and 38B (west) |
| Hanover | | 40.72 | 65.53 | 41 | US 301 / SR 2 – Richmond, Hanover | Signed as exits 41A (north) and 41B (south) |
| Henrico | | 43.04 | 69.27 | 43A-B | I-95 – Richmond, Washington, D.C. | Signed as exits 43A (north) and 43B (south); I-95 exit 84 |
| Henrico | Glen Allen | 43.57 | 70.12 | 43C-D | US 1 – Richmond, Ashland | Signed as exits 43C (north) and 43D (south) |
| Henrico | Glen Allen | 45.07 | 72.53 | 45 | Woodman Road | Signed as exits 45A (north) and 45B (south) |
| Henrico | | 48.38 | 77.86 | 49 | US 33 – Richmond, Montpelier | Signed as exits 49A (west) and 49B (east) |
| Henrico | | 50.72 | 81.63 | 51 | Nuckols Road | Signed as exits 51A (north) and 51B (south) Former VA 695 |
| Henrico | | 52.43 | 84.38 | 53 | I-64 to SR 288 / US 250 – Richmond, Charlottesville | Signed as exits 53A (west) and 53B (east); I-64 exit 177; trumpet interchange. |
1.000 mi = 1.609 km; 1.000 km = 0.621 mi
