= Bottoms Bridge, Virginia =

Unincorporated community in Virginia, US

Coordinates: 37°30′39″N 77°11′34″W

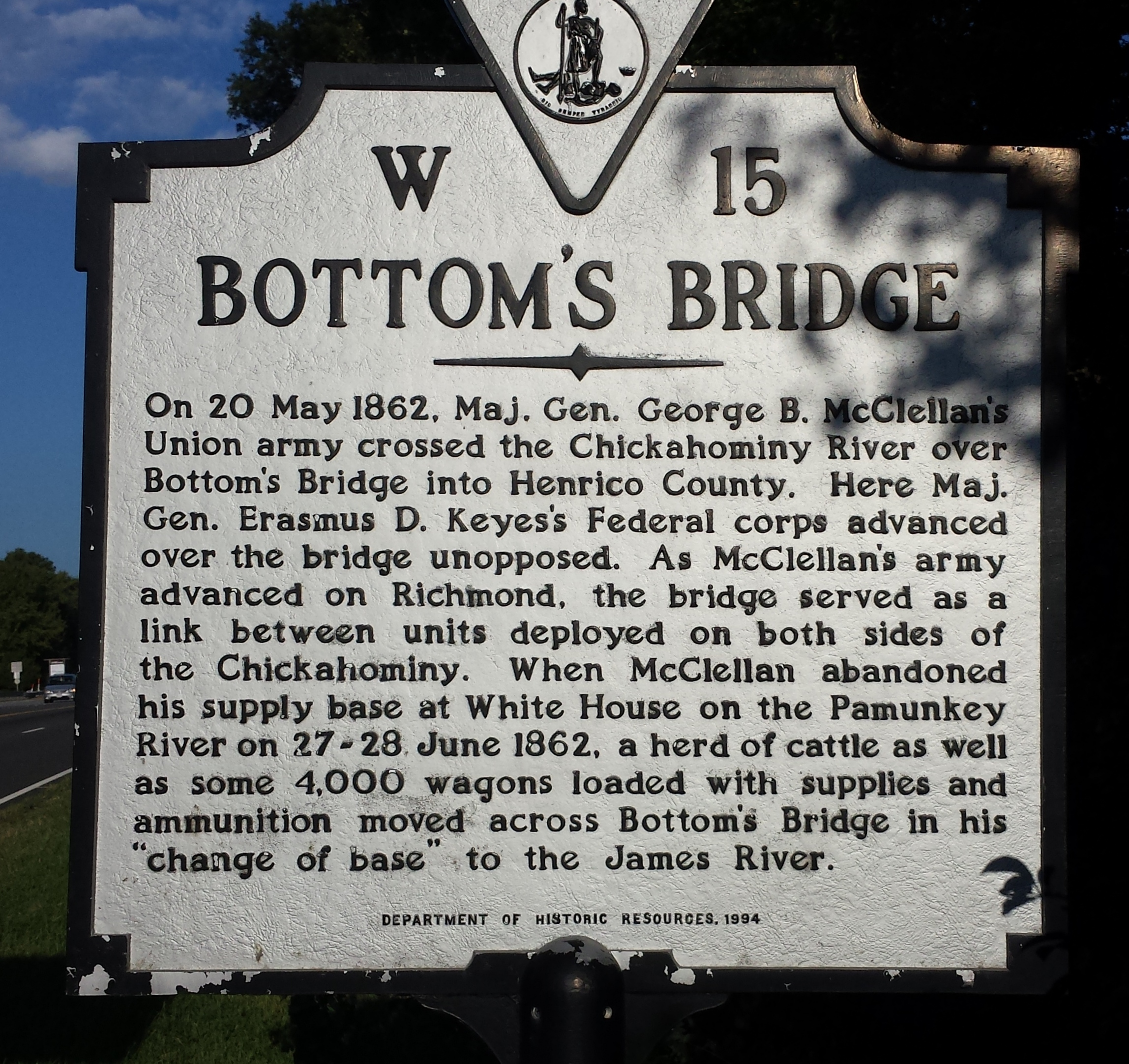
Chickahominy River and Rte. 60

Bottoms Bridge is a small unincorporated community in New Kent County, Virginia, United States. Located on U.S. Route 60 and State Route 33 in modern times, it was named for a crossing of the Chickahominy River between New Kent and Henrico County.
