= Talleysville, Virginia =

Unincorporated community in Virginia, US

Coordinates: 37.5245°N 77.0752°W

Talleysville is an unincorporated community in New Kent County, Virginia, United States.

Two buildings in the area, its St. Peter's Church and the Marl Hill were listed on the National Register of Historic Places in 1969 and 1990 respectively.
