= Bowers Hill Interchange =

Interchange in Virginia

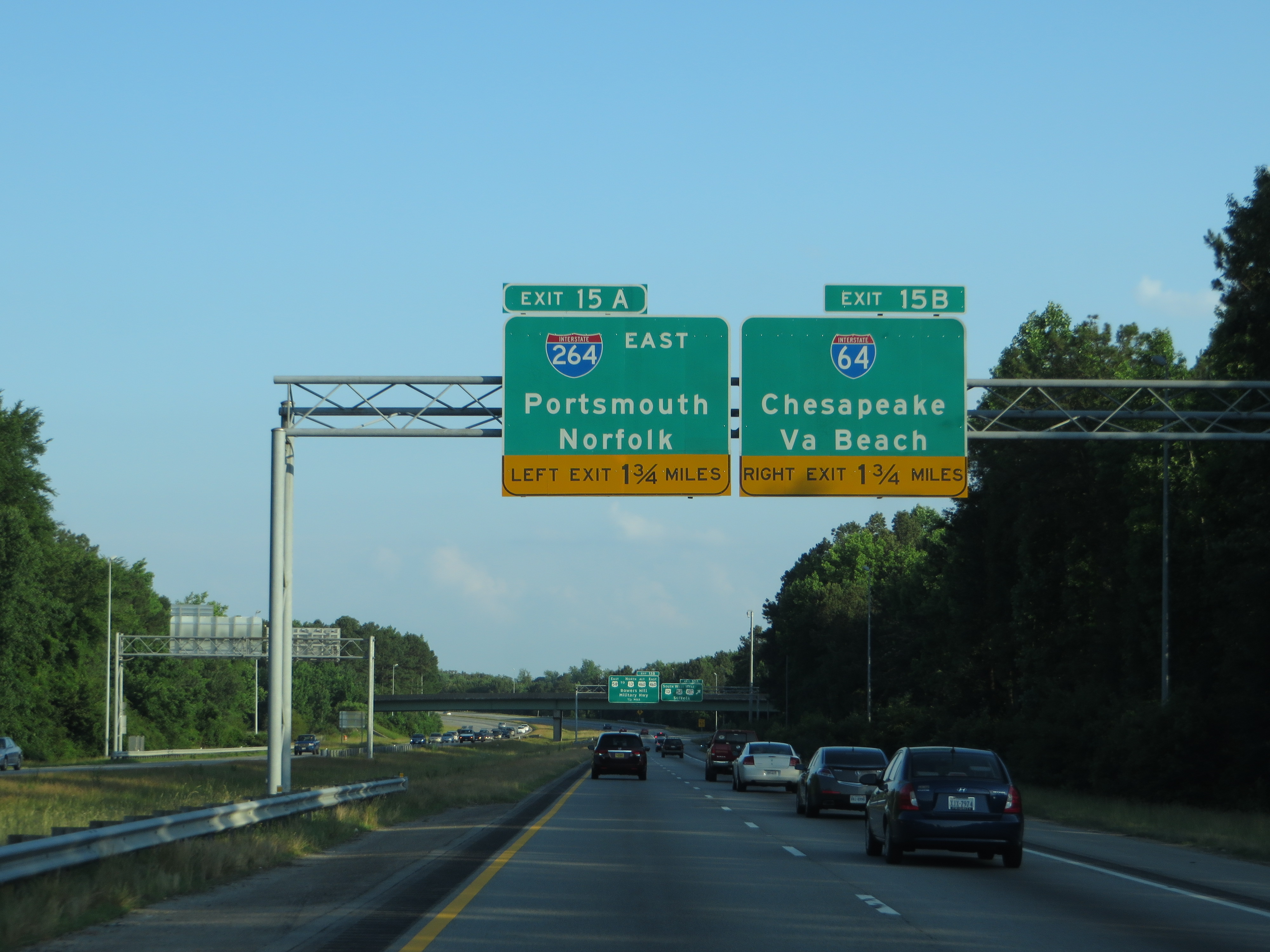
- Signs for I-264 east and I-64
- Interactive map of Bowers Hill Interchange

Location
- Chesapeake, Virginia
- Coordinates: 36°47′8.2″N 76°24′50.56″W
- Roads at junction: I-64 / I-664 (Hampton Roads Beltway); I-264; US 460 / US 13 / US 58 (Military Highway/Airline Blvd.)

Construction
- Type: Y-Interchange and Cloverstack
- Maintained by: VDOT

The Bowers Hill interchange is a large interchange complex where the Hampton Roads Beltway intersects with Interstate 264 (I-264) as well as Military Highway, which carries the three U.S. Highways. It is named for the unincorporated community surrounding it, Bowers Hill, Virginia, which itself is a part of the independent city of Chesapeake, Virginia.

== History ==
The first portions of I-264 were opened beginning in 1964 and in 1966 were completed from Bowers Hill to the western approach to the Downtown Tunnel in Portsmouth.

I-64, the region's major east–west artery, was built through the area beginning in the 1960s. The 22 miles (35 km) of I-64 between U.S. Route 460 (US 460) at Wards Corner in Norfolk and Bowers Hill in Chesapeake was completed in 1969. To reach the eastern terminus of the 945-mile (1,521 km) Interstate Highway at Bowers Hill, eastbound I-64 was built in a westerly direction for its final eight miles (13 km). By 1970, Bowers Hill had two Interstate Highways, and three arterial highways.

An additional crossing of Hampton Roads, to supplement the James River Bridge and the Hampton Roads Bridge-Tunnel, was a long-sought highway improvement in the area. A north–south roadway between Bowers Hill and the Churchland area was also wanted. Planning for what became I-664 began as early as 1964.

One of the more recent portions of the Interstate Highway System to be built in Virginia, I-664, was completed in April 1992. The 20.7-mile-long (33.3 km) highway connects Bowers Hill with Hampton. I-664 includes the 4.6-mile-long (7.4 km) Monitor-Merrimac Memorial Bridge-Tunnel across Hampton Roads between the independent cities of Newport News and Suffolk.

Major overpasses were built in conjunction with I-664, and its junction with the other highways required the demolition of the original overpass and interchange. A similar bridge to the original overpass remains nearby on Military Highway, crossing the now-abandoned Virginian Railway bed.

== Description ==
There are three main roads that make up the Bowers Hill Interchange: Airline Blvd from the northeast, the Hampton Roads Beltway from the north and the south, and Military Highway from the west and southeast.

The eastern terminus of Interstate 64 meets the southern terminus of Interstate 664 to continue the Hampton Roads Beltway. Because of the way the I-64 terminates—it is heading westerly, but is technically I-64 East, VDOT dropped all directional signs west of I-264 in Virginia Beach. Because of this, I-664 South and I-64 West traffic is called the Outer Loop. I-64 East and I-664 North is the Inner Loop. The eastern terminus of I-264 also meets in the same location to create a full Y-interchange.

I-264 traffic must exit northbound for the Inner Loop or the Outer Loop. Inner Loop traffic either exits left to continue on the Inner Loop or exits right to head eastbound on I-264 towards Portsmouth and Norfolk. Traffic on the Outer Loop north of I-264 will either continue on the Outer Loop, or exit left for I-264 East.

At the intersection of the Hampton Roads Beltway and concurrent routes of U.S. 460, U.S. 58 and US 13, the roads meet in a partial cloverstack interchange. Outer Loop traffic (southbound I-664) will exit on Exit 13A for U.S. 13 South, U.S. 58 West and U.S. 460 west, and use Exit 13B for the exact opposite (US 13 North, US 58 East and US 460 East). Inner Loop traffic (northbound I-664) will use a single ramp to access all of the U.S. Routes. At the conclusion of the Elizabeth River Tunnels Project however, U.S. 58 will no longer exit via the cloverstack interchange. Instead, it will share a concurrent route with I-264 eastbound until it interchanges with the MLK Freeway in Portsmouth.

=== Military Highway ===
Departing Suffolk, eastbound Military Highway traffic:

- Heading on the Inner Loop (I-664 N) or onto U.S. 58 East will utilize a left exit from Military Highway. Beltway traffic will use a right cloverleaf ramp to enter the beltway; Route 58 east and U.S. Route 460 Alternate east continue straight onto Airline Boulevard; U.S. Route 13 traffic turns right and continues on W. Military Hwy.
- Heading eastbound on I-264, or on the Outer Loop (I-64 West), or US-13 will utilize a right ramp, with all traffic technically merging onto the Outer Loop. I-264 traffic will exit to the left for exit 15A and U.S. 13 and Outer Loop traffic will exit at 15B. U.S. 13 traffic will then exit two miles later at exit 297 for Military Highway (signed for U.S. 13 / U.S. 460)

Departing Chesapeake, westbound Military Highway traffic headed on the Inner Loop (I-664 N) will use a right ramp to enter the beltway. Traffic headed for the outer loop, or I-264 will continue straight onto a clover loop exit to the Outer Loop. All other traffic (U.S. 13, U.S. 460) will continue straight to merge with U.S. 58 and continue westward.

Military Highway is the only route that will allow one to access the all directions of the interchange.
