= Western Branch, Virginia =

Western Branch
- Borough
- Location within the state of Virginia Western Branch (the United States)
- Coordinates: 36°50′45″N 76°24′0″W
- Country: United States
- State: Virginia
- Independent city: Chesapeake

Population (2010)
  - Total: 32,096
- Time zone: UTC−5 (Eastern (EST))
  - Summer (DST): UTC−4 (EDT)

Western Branch is a community located in the independent city of Chesapeake, Virginia (formerly Norfolk County) in the United States. It is located in the South Hampton Roads region and consists of generally low-lying sandy terrain of the coastal plain. Its namesake, the western branch of the Elizabeth River, defines the area's eastern boundary. Western Branch is the northernmost borough of Chesapeake.

== History ==
In the 1970s and early 1980s, many of the residents lived in Western Branch because of either the General Electric plant located in Suffolk, Virginia or because they were military families trying to live outside the busy Norfolk/Virginia Beach areas. As the GE plant shut down in the mid-1980s, many residents were left jobless, although many new opportunities opened up with the growth of business and industry in the area.

Throughout the 21st century, Western Branch is an almost exclusively residential area, with the exception of an area around the intersection of Taylor Road and Portsmouth Boulevard consisting of a Wal-Mart Supercenter, several small strip malls, and one enclosed mall, Chesapeake Square Mall which has become undersized relative to the rapid growth of the area since about 2001. Most residents commute to either Norfolk, Virginia Beach, or north across the harbor to the Virginia Peninsula.

Western Branch is bordered by Portsmouth to the east and northeast, Suffolk to the west and northwest, and the borough of Bowers Hill to the south.

== Transportation ==
Two highways are convenient for Western Branch residents; I-664, part of the Hampton Roads Beltway, cuts right through the center of Western Branch and takes residents north and south. Taking I-664 south allows residents to get on I-64, to head towards southern Chesapeake, and I-264, to head towards Portsmouth, and to Norfolk and Virginia Beach by taking the Downtown Tunnel.

At the northern boundary of the city, State Route 164 heads into the Norfolk/Virginia Beach area by taking a route through Portsmouth to the Midtown Tunnel.

== Education ==
Its only high school is Western Branch High School, operated by Chesapeake Public Schools which also serves the residents of Bower's Hill. The school's sports teams are named the "Western Branch Bruins." Historically, nearby Churchland High School in Portsmouth has been the school's closest rival. Nansemond River High School is one of Western Branch's newest rivalries, due to their classification in the Southeastern District and the social media trash talking that is persisted by the student sections Twitter accounts.
