= Inner circle =

Inner circle may refer to:

== Society ==
- Friendship networks, where "inner circle" may describe the closest of friends
- Esoteric teaching, knowledge that is confined to an inner group
- Inner–outer directions, a method of labeling direction of travel for geographic loops
- Inner Circle (addiction recovery), inner-most circle of three circles in addiction recovery diagram
- Inner circle (psychoanalysis) or Freud's inner circle
- Cabal, a group of people united in some close design together, usually to promote their private views or interests
- One of Kachru's Three Circles of English; see World Englishes

== Organizations ==
- Inner Circle of Advocates, trial lawyer group
- Inner Circle (parody group), a New York parody group
- The Inner Circle (dating site), an invitation-only online dating service for affluent, professional singles

== Transport ==
- Birmingham Inner Circle, a circular bus route following Birmingham's inner ring road in the West Midlands County of England
- Inner Circle, an early name for the central circuit route of the London Underground that is now known as the Circle line (London Underground)
- Inner Circle railway line, Melbourne, a former railway line in Melbourne, Australia
- clockwise service on the Yamanote Line in Tokyo, Japan

== Literature ==
- The Inner Circle (Boyle novel), a 2004 novel by T. C. Boyle about Alfred Kinsey
- The Inner Circle (Meltzer novel), a 2011 novel by Brad Meltzer

== Film and television ==
- The Inner Circle (1912 film), a film directed by D. W. Griffith
- The Inner Circle (1946 film), an American film directed by Philip Ford
- The Inner Circle (1991 film), a film about KGB officer Ivan Sanchin
- "The Inner Circle" (The Office), a 2011 television episode
- "Inner Circles" (Doctors), a 2004 television episode
- "Inner Circles" (Prime Suspect), a 1995 television episode
- The Inner Circle (game show), a 2025 television programme

== Music ==
- Inner Circle (band), a Jamaican reggae group
- The Inner Circle (album), a 2004 album by Evergrey
- The Black Metal Inner Circle from the early Norwegian black metal scene

== Other ==
- Inner Circle (board game), a Milton Bradley board game from 1981
- Inner Circle Rum, a brand of rum made and sold in Australia
- Inner Circle, a fictional terrorist group in Call of Duty: Modern Warfare 3
- Inner Circle (professional wrestling), professional wrestling stable in All Elite Wrestling led by Chris Jericho

== See also ==
- Outer Circle (disambiguation)
