= Outer Circle =

Outer Circle may refer to:

== Transportation ==
- Birmingham Outer Circle, West Midlands bus route 11, a 27-mile route around Birmingham, England
- Outer Circle (London), a railway route in London 1872–1908, and the related Super Outer Circle
- Outer Circle railway line, a steam-era suburban railway line in Melbourne, Australia
  - The Outer Circle Trail
- The Outer Circle Line, a former proposed line in Singapore merged into the Circle Line
- counterclockwise service on the Yamanote Line in Tokyo, Japan
- Inner–outer directions, labels that identify the direction of travel on opposing lanes of traffic

== Other ==
- one of Kachru's Three Circles of English
- one of the Three circles, an exercise/diagram used by recovering addicts

== See also ==
- Outer Ring (disambiguation)
- Inner Circle (disambiguation)
