= Interstate 64 =

East–west Interstate in the United States

Interstate 64
- I-64 highlighted in red

Route information
- Length: 963.52 mi (1,550.64 km)
- Existed: August 14, 1957–present
- NHS: Entire route

Major junctions
- West end: I-70 / US 40 / US 61 in Wentzville, MO
- I-44 / I-55 in St. Louis, MO; I-55 / I-70 / US 40 in East St. Louis, IL; I-57 in Mt. Vernon, IL; I-69 in Elberfeld, IN; I-65 / I-71 in Louisville, KY; I-75 through Lexington, KY; I-77 between Charleston and Beckley, WV; I-81 between Lexington and Staunton, VA; I-95 through Richmond, VA
- East end: I-264 / I-664 / US 13 / US 58 / US 460 in Chesapeake, VA

Location
- Country: United States
- States: Missouri, Illinois, Indiana, Kentucky, West Virginia, Virginia

Highway system
- Interstate Highway System; Main; Auxiliary; Suffixed; Business; Future

Interstate 64 (I-64) is an east–west Interstate Highway in the Eastern United States. Its western terminus is at I-70, U.S. Route 40 (US 40), and US 61 in Wentzville, Missouri. Its eastern terminus is at the Bowers Hill Interchange with I-264 and I-664 at Bower's Hill in Chesapeake, Virginia. I-64 connects Greater St. Louis, the Louisville metropolitan area, the Lexington–Fayette metropolitan area, the Charleston, WV metropolitan area, the Greater Richmond Region, and Hampton Roads.

== Route description ==
Lengths
	mi	km
MO	40.50	65.18
IL	128.12	206.19
IN	123.33	198.48
KY	191.0	307.4
WV	188.75	303.76
VA	297.62	478.97
Total	969.32	1,559.97

I-64 has concurrencies with I-55, I-57, I-75, I-77, I-81, and I-95. I-64 does not maintain exit number continuity for any of the overlaps, as each of the six north–south routes maintain their exit numbering on their respective overlaps with I-64. Of all the overlaps, I-64 only goes northeast and southwest with I-55 and I-81, while going southeast and northwest with the other Interstates.

=== Missouri ===
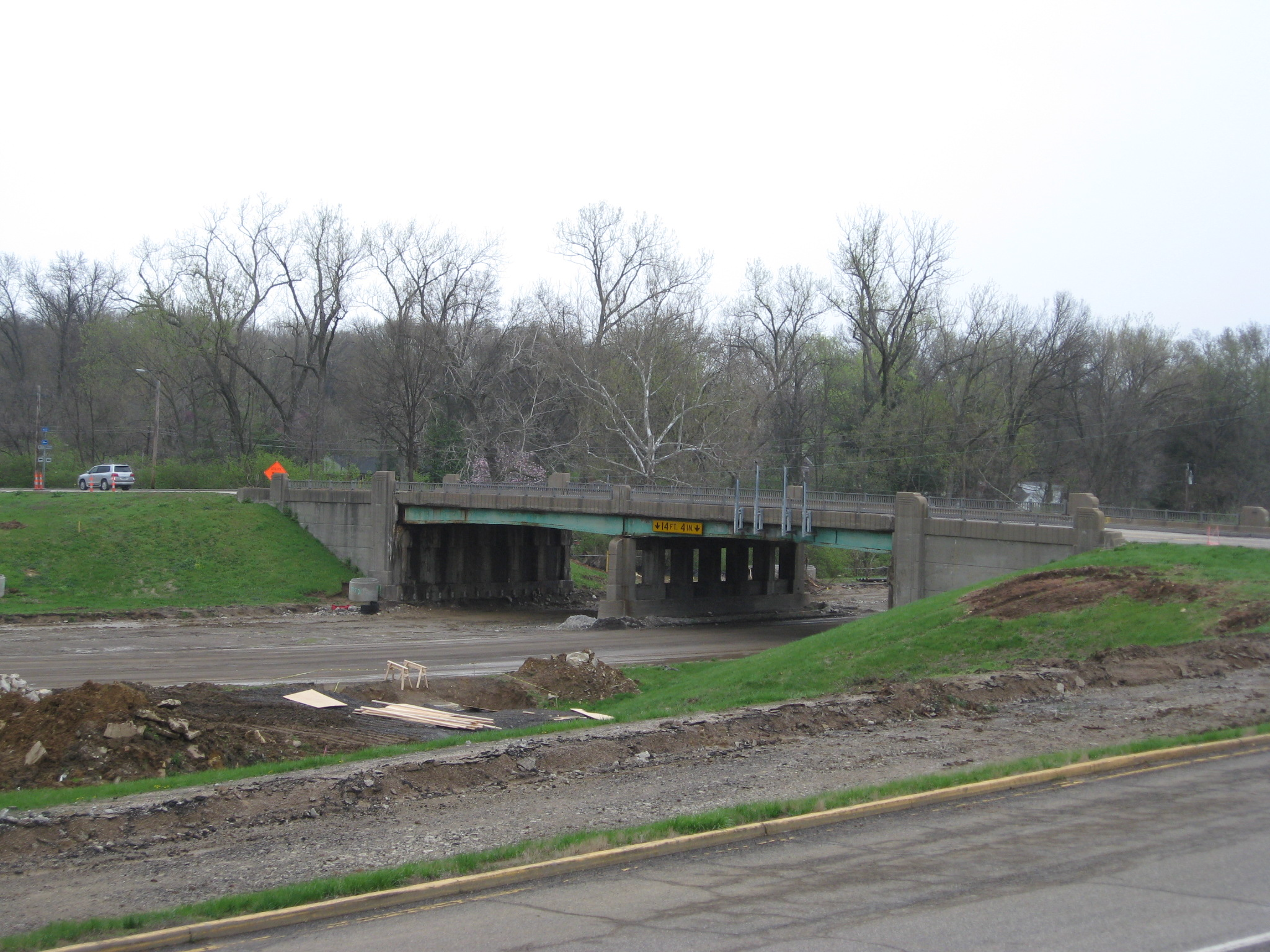
The Spoede Road overpass in Missouri above I-64, demolished in June 2008

In Missouri, the stretch was originally labeled as the Daniel Boone Expressway then only as US 40, and, as such, is still known to some locals in Greater St. Louis as Highway 40, even though the road has been designated as both I-64 and US 40 since 1988. This road is also the southernmost portion of the Avenue of the Saints. An interchange at Highway N in O'Fallon opened on December 13, 2004. This interchange also accommodates the tie-in of the Route 364 freeway to I-64. In April 2007, construction started to rebuild 10.5 miles (16.9 km) of I-64 in St. Louis from Spoede Road to Kingshighway. This project included repaving the entire road, rebuilding the overpasses and interchanges, adding a fourth lane between Spoede Road and I-170, and connecting I-64 to I-170 in all directions. Construction resulted in the complete closure of portions of the expressway in 2008 and 2009. In 2008, I-64 was closed from I-270 to I-170, reopening December 15, 2008. Beginning December 15, 2008, I-64 from I-170 to Kingshighway was closed. On December 6, 2009, with a grand opening ceremony and dedication, I-64 was completed in its entire length in Missouri from the Poplar Street Bridge to I-70 in Wentzville. As of December 7, 2009, I-64 is now complete and signed all the way to I-70 in Wentzville. All stoplights have been removed. The portion of I-64 in St. Louis has been named the Jack Buck Memorial Highway, in honor of the late sportscaster.

=== Illinois ===
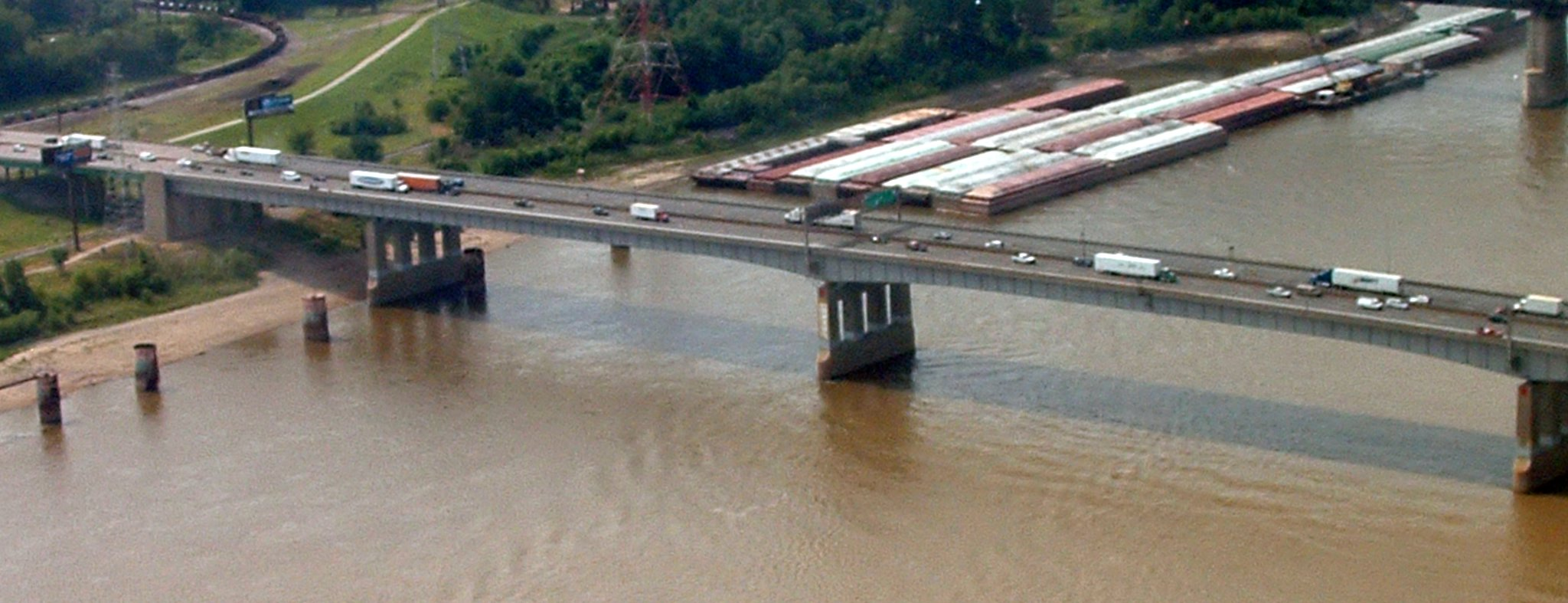
I-64 crosses the Poplar Street Bridge from Missouri to Illinois.

I-64 enters Illinois from St. Louis, Missouri, via the Poplar Street Bridge, where it overlaps I-55 as it crosses the Mississippi River. After crossing the city of East St. Louis and the rest of suburban St. Clair County, the freeway heads southeast through rural Southern Illinois. Shortly after passing MidAmerica St. Louis Airport at exit 23, I-64 enters Clinton County and then Washington County. After providing access to towns such as Carlyle, Breese, Nashville, and Centralia, the freeway overlaps I-57 through the Mount Vernon area for approximately five miles (8.0 km). East of Mount Vernon in Illinois, services along I-64 are slim to none. It is an almost completely flat and empty freeway, crossing Jefferson, Wayne, and White counties as it progresses east toward Indiana and the Evansville, Indiana, area. East of the St. Louis area, there are numerous oilwells dotting the landscape.

The section from Illinois Route 127 (IL 127) to I-57 opened on October 4, 1974. The section from IL 161 to IL 127 opened in December 1973. The section in Metro East, except for a short section near I-55/I-70, opened on December 23, 1975. The section from US 460 (later IL 142) to US 45 opened on August 7, 1975.

=== Indiana ===
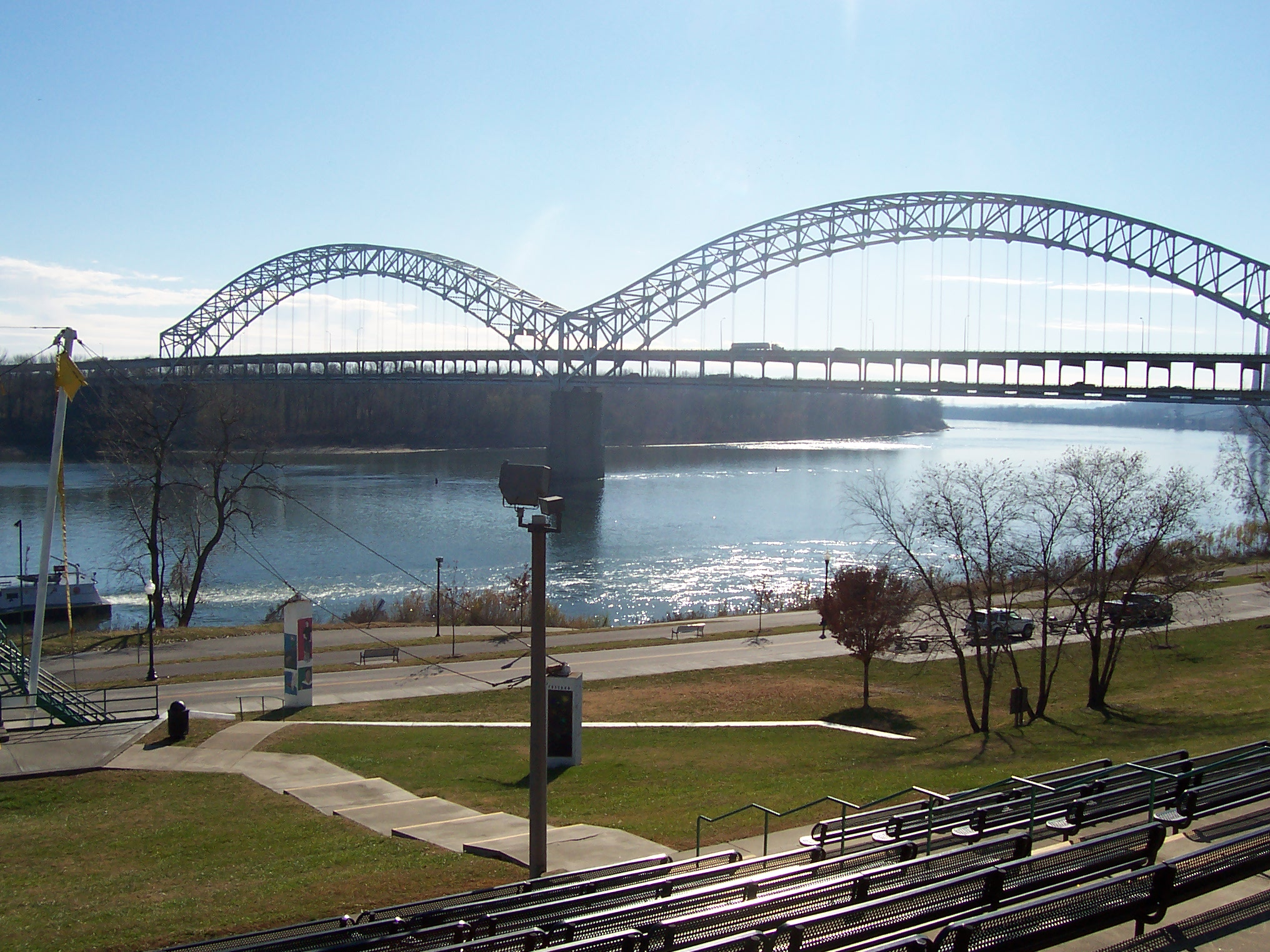
I-64 crosses the Sherman Minton Bridge in New Albany, Indiana.

I-64 crosses the Wabash River and enters the state of Indiana. It passes Griffin (State Road 69, or SR 69; exit 4) and Poseyville (SR 165; exit 12) and also passes under nearby SR 68 (no direct interchange serves SR 68, though one can access said route from either SR 165 or SR 65). The Interstate then passes three officially marked exits for Evansville (SR 65, US 41, and I-69 [formerly designated as I-164]) then proceeds through part of the scenic Hoosier National Forest, with exits leading to Dale and Huntingburg (US 231; exit 57); Santa Claus and Ferdinand (SR 162; exit 63); French Lick and Tell City (SR 37; exit 79); and Indiana's first state capital, Corydon (SR 135; exit 105).

Near milepost 61, there is a time change from the Central Time Zone (CT; Spencer County) to the Eastern Time Zone (ET; Dubois County). Between mileposts 60 and 80, I-64 crosses the CT–ET zone boundary five times. With most timezone changes on highways maintained by the Indiana Department of Transportation (INDOT), changes in timezone are not usually marked with any roadside signage. The final crossing into the ET zone at the Perry–Crawford county border, however, is marked with road signage.

Between Evansville and New Albany, I-64 intersects a few major north–south arterial highways, such as US 231, SR 37, and SR 135 and offers access to I-65 to Indianapolis via I-265 before crossing into Kentucky on the Sherman Minton Bridge.

The 123.33-mile (198.48 km) route in Indiana can be described as being somewhat winding, especially the farther east one travels within the state. The longest straight line distance along the route is the nine-mile (14 km) stretch from the SR 65 exit to mikemarker 26, one mile (1.6 km) east of US 41, along the Gibson-Vanderburgh county line. There are many points along the route where the two halves of the highway are nearly 500 feet (150 m) apart, especially around the Hoosier National Forest and points to the east. In addition, there are several points, especially in the very sharp valleys along its route in Dubois, Perry, Crawford, and Harrison counties, where the highway towers more than 100 feet (30 m) above the surrounding terrain.

=== Kentucky ===
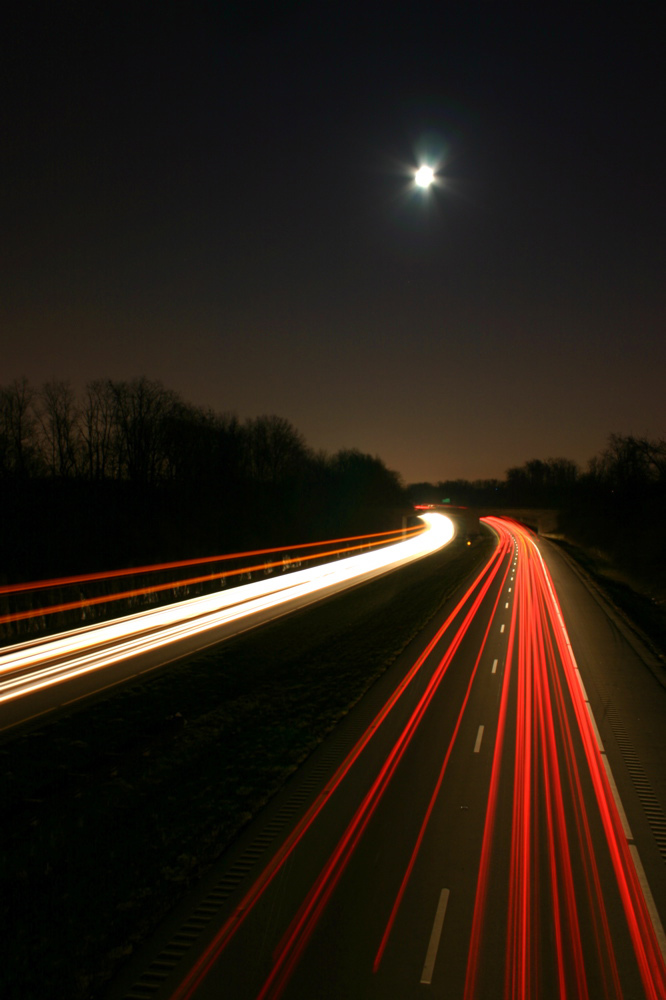
Streaking lights on I-64 as seen from the horse/bike bridge at Seneca Park in Louisville, Kentucky

I-64 enters Kentucky at Louisville, paralleling the Ohio River along the Riverfront Expressway. It intersects with several downtown interchanges before coming to the Kennedy Interchange, where it intersects I-65 and I-71 in a tangle of ramps often referred to as the "Spaghetti Junction". Moving eastward, I-64 passes through Shelbyville, Frankfort, Midway, Lexington, Winchester, Mount Sterling, Owingsville, and Morehead, before leaving the state near Ashland at Catlettsburg. It overlaps I-75 as it makes an arc around the northeast of Lexington's urban core, with the exit numbers for I-75 used for the concurrent portion. The two Interstates separate a few miles east of downtown Lexington.

=== West Virginia ===
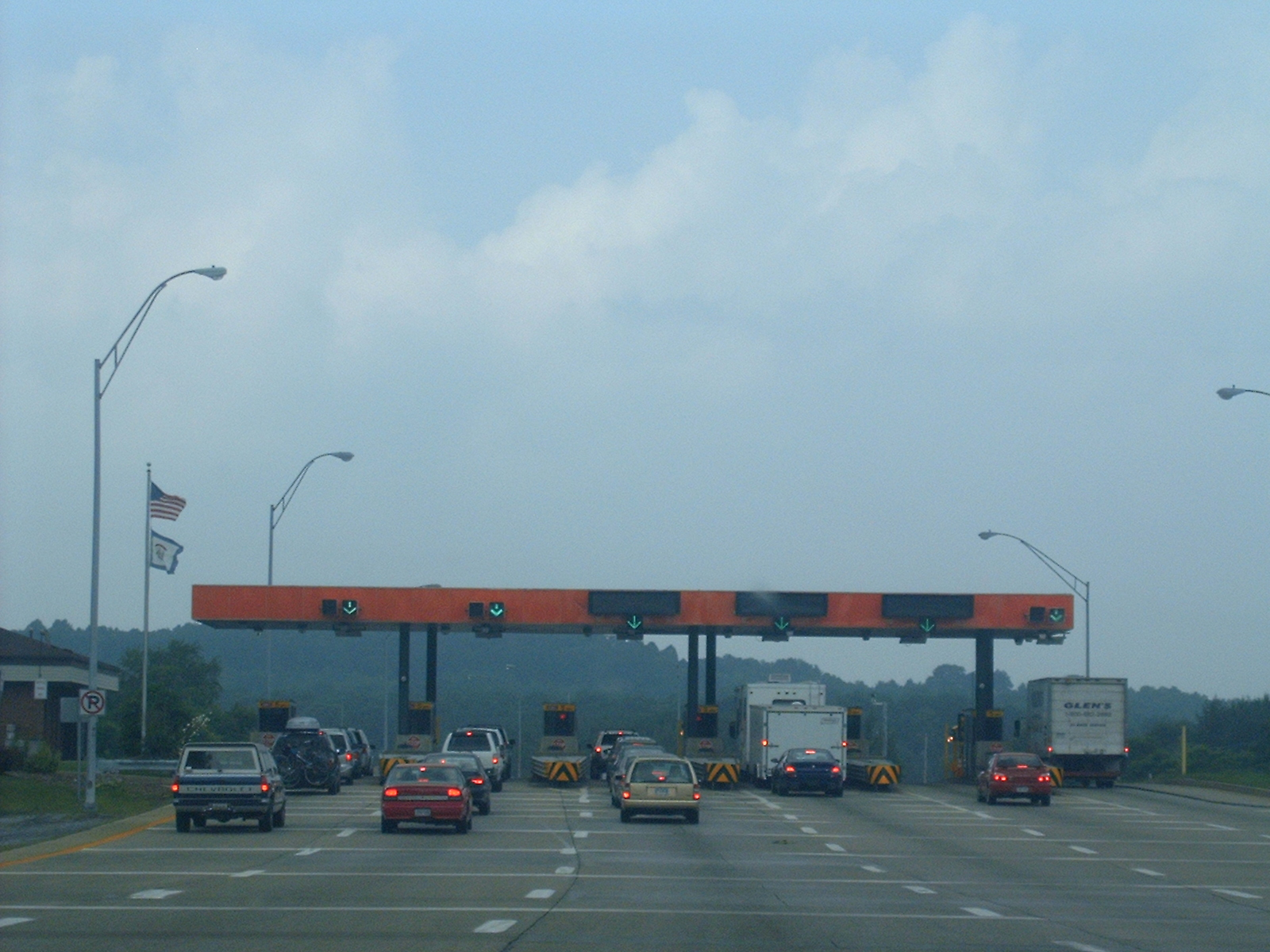
Tollbooths on the West Virginia Turnpike

I-64 travels for 188.75 miles (303.76 km) within the state of West Virginia, passing by the major cities of Huntington, Beckley, and Lewisburg and directly through the capital city of Charleston. It has only two major junctions within the state: I-77 in Charleston and in Beckley. It also crosses the Kanawha River a total of four times in a 20-mile (32 km) stretch (twice west of Charleston, immediately before entering the downtown Charleston area, then approximately five miles (8.0 km) east of downtown Charleston in Kanawha City).

Between I-64's two junctions with I-77, I-64 and I-77 overlap. From the final crossing of the Kanawha River east of Charleston to their split at exit 40 south of Beckley, the two Interstates are tolled, forming a part of the West Virginia Turnpike.

While the two expressways overlap, the exit signs are those for I-77. Thus, eastbound travelers entering from Kentucky will see exit numbers increase until exit 60, at which time I-77's exit numbers are used, decreasing from exit 100.

=== Virginia ===
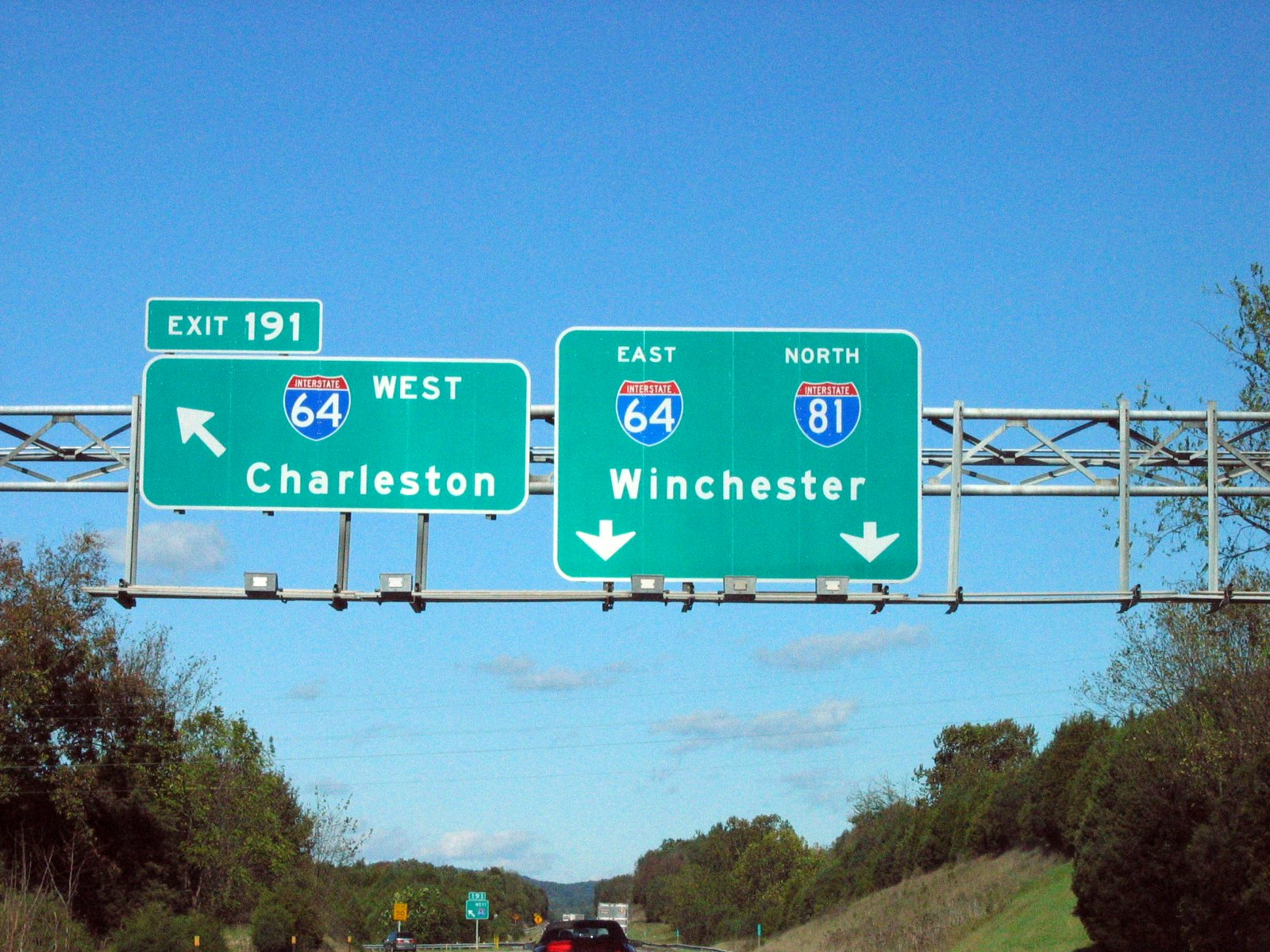
Southern terminus of the I-81/I-64 overlap near Lexington, Virginia

I-64 in Virginia runs east–west through central Virginia from West Virginia via Covington, Lexington, Staunton, and Charlottesville to Richmond. From Lexington to Staunton, it overlaps I-81 (using I-81 exit numbers). In Richmond, it overlaps I-95. From Richmond, I-64 continues southeasterly through Newport News and Hampton to the Hampton Roads Bridge–Tunnel and then through Norfolk and a small portion of Virginia Beach to end in Chesapeake.

I-64 itself does not reach the Oceanfront area of Virginia Beach, as it continues through the western portion of Virginia Beach as part of the circumferential Hampton Roads Beltway. At its terminus, eastbound I-64 runs over 12 miles (19 km) westbound (and westbound I-64 eastbound) as the route forms a fishhook around Norfolk. I-264 intersects the beltway, providing access to other parts of Norfolk and Chesapeake and extending east to the Oceanfront.

Access to the Oceanfront area is accomplished from I-64 via a portion of I-264, a roadway originally built as the Virginia Beach Expressway, funded by tolls to retire revenue bonds. It ends at I-664 and I-264 in Portsmouth

== History ==
Elements of I-64, such as the Sherman Minton bridge over the Ohio River on the Indiana–Kentucky border, were completed by the early 1960s. The Interstate was complete between St. Louis and Charleston with the completion of the 9th Street overpass in Louisville in December 1976.

In Virginia, the proposed southern route between Clifton Forge and Richmond called for the Interstate to follow from Richmond via US 360 and US 460, via Lynchburg to Roanoke and US 220 from Roanoke to Clifton Forge, then west following US 60 into West Virginia. The initial 1957 recommendation by a state-retained engineering consultant was for the northern route, but, due in large part to the efforts of a Virginia Senator Mosby Perrow Jr. from Lynchburg, the state changed the location to the southern route in 1959. Despite assurances from the federal government that the route would be decided by the state, Virginia's 1959 decision was overturned in favor of the northern route through Charlottesville.

I-64 had a proposed routing around the US 50 corridor in Illinois when the Interstates were first planned. Local pressure pushed the routing closer to the US 460 corridor because of the cheaper cost and shorter mileage compared to the original routing, but not before construction was started on a short section that is now US 50 between Vincennes, Indiana, and Lawrenceville, Illinois. It is also worth noting that the apparent route of I-64 would have taken it through the southern end of Carlyle Lake which was also under construction at this time.

I-64 signs started going up in August 1987 on the US 40 freeway in St. Louis. This change was made in part due to truck drivers deliberately using US 40 to avoid mandatory fines for overweight trucks.

On September 9, 2011, the Sherman Minton Bridge was closed down by Indiana Governor Mitch Daniels after construction crews found cracks in the main load bearing structural element. Mainline traffic was redirected to I-265, then south on I-65 across the John F. Kennedy Memorial Bridge before rejoining I-64 at the Kennedy Interchange in Louisville. Repairs were completed in a few months later, and the Sherman Minton Bridge reopened at 11:50 pm on February 17, 2012.

== Junction list ==
Missouri
I-70 / US 40 / US 61 in Wentzville. I-64/US 40 travels concurrently to East St. Louis. I-64/US 61 travels concurrently to the Frontenac–Ladue city line.
I-270 in Town and Country
US 61 / US 67 on the Frontenac–Ladue city line
I-170 in Richmond Heights
I-44 / I-55 in St. Louis. I-55/I-64 travels concurrently to East, St. Louis, Illinois.
Illinois
I-55 / I-70 / US 40 in East St. Louis
I-255 / US 50 in Caseyville. I-64/US 50 travels concurrently to O'Fallon.
US 51 in Richview
I-57 in Mount Vernon. The highways travel concurrently to south-southwest of Mount Vernon.
US 45 north of Mill Shoals
Indiana
US 41 west-southwest of Warrenton
I-69 west-northwest of Elberfeld. Former Junction of Interstate 164
US 231 in Dale
US 150 west of New Albany. The highways travel concurrently to Louisville.
I-265 in New Albany
Kentucky
I-264 in Louisville
I-65 in Louisville
I-71 in Louisville
US 42 / US 60 in Louisville
I-264 in Louisville
I-265 on the Middletown–Louisville city line
US 127 in Frankfort
US 60 in Jett
US 62 northwest of Lexington
I-75 in Lexington. The highways travel concurrently through Lexington.
US 27 / US 68 in Lexington
US 60 northeast of Winchester
US 460 in Mt. Sterling
US 60 northeast of Mt. Sterling
US 60 east-southeast of Owingsville
US 60 northeast of Olive Hill
US 60 in Coalton
US 23 south-southwest of Catlettsburg
West Virginia
US 52 in Kenova. The highways travel concurrently to Huntington.
US 60 in Barboursville
US 35 in Teays Valley
US 60 in South Charleston
US 119 in Charleston. The highways travel concurrently through Charleston.
US 60 in Charleston
I-77 in Charleston. The highways travel concurrently to southeast of Crab Orchard.
US 60 north of Chelyan
US 60 south-southeast of Crawley
US 219 in Lewisburg
US 60 east of White Sulphur Springs
US 60 east-southeast of White Sulphur Springs. The highways travel concurrently to Callaghan, Virginia.
Virginia
US 60 / US 220 in Mallow. I-64/US 60 travels concurrently to north-northwest of Lexington. I-64/US 220 travels concurrently to east-northeast of Clifton Forge.
US 11 in East Lexington
I-81 east of East Lexington. The highways travel concurrently to Jolivue.
US 11 northeast of East Lexington
US 11 in Greenville
US 340 in Waynesboro
US 250 in Rockfish Gap
US 250 in Yancey Mills
US 29 west-southwest of Charlottesville
US 250 east-southeast of Charlottesville
US 15 north-northeast of Zion Crossroads
US 522 northeast of Gum Spring
I-295 in Short Pump
US 250 in Innsbrook
US 250 in Dumbarton
US 33 in Dumbarton
I-195 in Richmond
I-95 in Richmond. The highways travel concurrently through Richmond.
US 1 / US 301 in Richmond
US 360 on the boundary of Richmond with East Highland Park
I-295 / US 60 east of Sandston
US 17 in Newport News
US 258 in Hampton
I-664 in Hampton
US 60 in Hampton. The highways travel concurrently to Norfolk
I-564 / US 460 in Norfolk
US 13 in Norfolk
I-264 in Norfolk
I-464 / US 17 in Chesapeake. I-64/US 17 travels concurrently through Chesapeake.
US 13 / US 460 in Chesapeake
I-264 / I-664 in Chesapeake

== Auxiliary routes ==
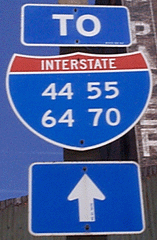
I-44/I-55/I-64/I-70 on one highway sign in Downtown St. Louis, Missouri

- I-164: Former spur to Evansville, Indiana, known as the Robert D. Orr Highway, became I-69 in 2014.
- I-264: Loop around Louisville, Kentucky; also called the Georgia Davis Powers/Shawnee Expressway west of the Dixie Highway (US 31W) exit and the Watterson Expressway east of US 31W/Dixie Highway
- I-264, I-464, I-564, I-664: All serving the Hampton Roads region in Virginia.
