= Hampton Roads Beltway =

Highway in Virginia

Hampton Roads Beltway
- Hampton Roads Beltway highlighted in red

Route information
- Maintained by VDOT
- Length: 56 mi (90 km)
- Component highways: I-64 northeast, east, and southern sides only; I-664 west side only

Major junctions
- Beltway around Hampton Roads
- I-64 in Hampton; I-564 in Norfolk; I-264 in Norfolk; I-464 in Chesapeake; I-264 in Chesapeake

Location
- Country: United States
- State: Virginia

Highway system
- Virginia Routes; Interstate; US; Primary; Secondary; Byways; History; HOT lanes

The Hampton Roads Beltway is a loop of Interstate 64 and Interstate 664, which links the communities of the Virginia Peninsula and South Hampton Roads which surround the body of water known as Hampton Roads and comprise much of the region of the same name in the southeastern portion of Virginia in the United States. It crosses the harbor of Hampton Roads at two locations on large four-laned bridge-tunnel facilities: the eastern half carries Interstate 64 (and U.S. Route 60) and uses the Hampton Roads Bridge-Tunnel and the western half carries Interstate 664 and uses the Monitor-Merrimac Memorial Bridge-Tunnel. The beltway has the clockwise direction (as looking down at a map of the area) signed as the Inner Loop, and the counter-clockwise direction signed as the Outer Loop. The entire beltway, including the bridge-tunnels, is owned and operated by the Virginia Department of Transportation.

== History ==
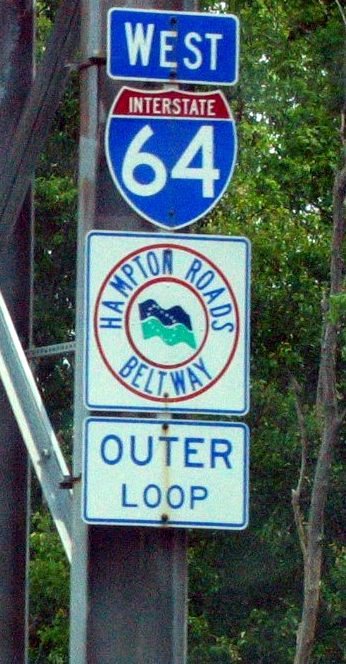
I-64 on the Hampton Roads Beltway, north of I-264

Even before Interstate 64 was built beginning in 1958, from some of the earliest planning stages, there were hopes of a circumferential highway to Interstate highway standards for the Hampton Roads region. Some proposals envisioned state and local and/or toll funding if necessary to achieve that goal.

Indeed, the first two-laned portion of the Hampton Roads Bridge-Tunnel was built with toll revenue bond funding in 1957 prior to the creation of I-64. It carried U.S. Route 60 and State Route 168 designations, and tied in with the new Tidewater Drive in Norfolk. (Tolls were removed when the other two lanes and tunnel were built adjacently to the immediate south of the older structure with federal Interstate Highway funding in the mid 1970s.)

Building of Interstate 64 was the first priority in the region, and a portion of Interstate 264 through Portsmouth connecting with the Downtown Tunnel was completed even as I-64 finally reached its eastern terminus at Bower's Hill in Norfolk County (which became the City of Chesapeake in 1963).

I-64, the portion of the Hampton Roads Beltway which was completed first, makes a huge 35-mile (56 km) long arc around the area, from Hampton through portions of Norfolk, Virginia Beach, and Chesapeake and around Portsmouth to reach Bower's Hill at the edge of the Great Dismal Swamp.

It was a number of years before the newer I-664 portion was built. The 21-mile (34 km) roadway connects with I-64 at Bower's Hill in Chesapeake and crosses through portions of Portsmouth and Suffolk to cross Hampton Roads via the Monitor-Merrimac Memorial Bridge-Tunnel and then pass through eastern Newport News to reconnect with I-64 in Hampton. This completed the loop in 1992.

In January, 1997, a 56-mile (90 km)-long I-64/I-664 loop was designated by the Virginia Department of Transportation (and signed) as the Hampton Roads Beltway.

== Route description ==
I-664 begins at a full Y interchange with I-64 and I-264 that serves as the terminus of all three Interstates in the Bowers Hill section of the city of Chesapeake. I-64 heads southeast as a continuation of the Hampton Roads Beltway through Chesapeake while I-264 heads east toward Portsmouth and Norfolk. I-664 heads west as an eight-lane freeway that has a southbound-only exit ramp to US 13 and US 460 (Military Highway) and crosses over Military Highway and a Norfolk Southern Railway rail line. The Interstate has a cloverleaf interchange with Military Highway, which here carries US 58 in addition to US 13 and US 460. The interchange also provides access to US 460 Alternate, which follows US 58 east into Portsmouth. I-664 curves north as a four-lane freeway that crosses Goose Creek and has a diamond interchange with SR 663 (Dock Landing Road) and a cloverleaf interchange with SR 337 (Portsmouth Boulevard).

Just south of its partial cloverleaf interchange with SR 659 (Pughsville Road), I-664 crosses a rail line; a spur from that rail line heads north in the median of the freeway as the highway enters the city of Suffolk. The rail spur leaves the median and heads northeast toward Portsmouth just south of its interchange with SR 164 (Western Freeway) and US 17 (Bridge Road). SR 164 heads east toward downtown Portsmouth while US 17 heads northwest to the James River Bridge. There is no access from southbound I-664 to southbound US 17; that movement is made via the next interchange, a cloverleaf interchange with SR 135 (College Drive) that serves satellite campuses of Tidewater Community College and Old Dominion University and the Portsmouth neighborhood of Churchland.

North of SR 135, northbound I-664 has a vehicle inspection station and crossovers before the highway enters the Monitor-Merrimac Memorial Bridge-Tunnel. The bridge-tunnel passes to the west of Craney Island, an artificial island in the city of Portsmouth that lies to the west of the mouth of the Elizabeth River. West of the highway is the confluence of the James River and Nansemond River to form Hampton Roads, as well as the James River Bridge a short distance to the north on the namesake river. I-664 heads north-northeast along a causeway for 3 miles (4.8 km) to a point west of the Newport News Middle Ground Light, where the pair of bridges curve to the north-northwest onto an artificial island where the highway descends into a pair of tunnels under the estuary's main shipping channel. The Interstate resurfaces on another artificial island at Newport News Point east of the coal piers in the city of Newport News.

I-664 has a southbound vehicle inspection station adjacent to its first interchange in Newport News, with Terminal Avenue. The Interstate parallels the southern end of CSX's Peninsula Subdivision as it passes through interchanges with several streets to the east of downtown Newport News. The southern interchange has ramps to and from 25th, 26th, and 27th streets; the first two streets carry eastbound and westbound US 60, which is unmarked from I-664. The northern interchange has ramps to and from 35th Street and Jefferson Avenue; Jefferson Avenue is SR 143, which is also unmarked from the Interstate. I-664 curves east as a six-lane freeway away from the railroad and has an oblique crossing of SR 351 (39th Street) prior to half-diamond interchanges with Roanoke Avenue and Chestnut Street. The Interstate enters the city of Hampton and has diamond interchanges with Aberdeen Road and Powhatan Parkway before reaching its northern terminus at I-64. I-664 meets its parent highway at a directional T interchange above Newmarket Creek just south of Hampton Coliseum.

The Hampton Roads Beltway continues east along I-64, continuing the Inner Loop. I-64 curves north-northeast to pass north of Downtown Hampton and cross the Hampton River, turning back southward to reach the Hampton Roads Bridge-Tunnel, which it utilizes to cross the main shipping channel at the entrance to the harbor of Hampton Roads from the Chesapeake Bay.

Once on the Southside, I-64 turns south through Norfolk, passing the eastern boundary of Naval Station Norfolk and Chambers Field, and the spur route supplying it, Interstate 564. At Wards Corner, it then becomes a six lane divided highway with a two lane reversible roadway in the middle, which is used for HOV-traffic during morning and afternoon rush hours. It continues through Norfolk, curving multiple times and eventually ending up heading due south as it passes the interchange with another of its spur routes, Interstate 264 on the northwest side of Virginia Beach.

After I-264, there are no more directional markers I-64 until its "eastern" terminus, because I-64 "east" will actually head west after its current southward course, and vice versa. From I-264 to its "eastern" terminus, it is simply only signed as the Inner and Outer loop of the Hampton Roads Beltway.

Shortly after the I-264 interchange, I-64 leaves Virginia Beach for the city of Chesapeake. It soon comes to a complex interchange between another of its spur routes, Interstate 464, along with SR 168 and U.S. 17. I-64, now running westward, crosses the Southern Branch of the Elizabeth River using the High Rise Bridge. The road then curves northwesterly and comes back to Bowers Hill, where it meets the western terminus of Interstate 264 and the southern terminus of Interstate 664, completing the Beltway.

== Projects ==
=== High Rise Bridge & I-64 widening ===
The Southside portion of the Beltway (from the I-464/SR 168/U.S. 17 interchange in Chesapeake to the Bowers Hill Interchange in Suffolk) was approved in March 2015 for the addition of two lanes of capacity in each direction, with the possibility of them being either 2 HOT lanes, 1 HOV & 1 general purpose lane or all four lanes being tolled. Widening would be accomplished by adding the lanes in the median east of U.S. 17 and to the outside shoulder west of U.S. 17. The approved plan also calls for the construction of a new, four-lane 135 ft. fixed span bridge to the south of the current High Rise Bridge. Construction will be conducted in multiple phases, similar to the widening project on the Peninsula:

- The first phase of the project would widen I-64 to 6 lanes in each direction by adding the new lane to the median in both directions as a managed lane, begin the construction of the new High Rise Bridge, and replace and rehabilitate other existing bridges in the area. This segment is estimated to cost around $600 million.
- The second phase would see all six lanes of I-64 shifted to the newly constructed bridge while the old bridge is demolished and replaced with a new four lane bridge that would eventually carry Inner Loop (I-64 West) traffic.
- The final phase would see the addition of the fourth lanes of traffic added to both directions and the shift of Inner Loop/I-64 West to the newly reconstructed bridge.

Once completed, the entire corridor would be an eight-lane stretch of highway, with two 135-ft fixed span bridges. Estimated costs for the entire project are currently estimated at $2.30 billion. Currently, the project is expected to be awarded in August 2017, with construction likely to begin in 2018. Plans have construction to be complete by 2020.

=== Outer Loop/I-264 interchange widening ===
In 2016, VDOT undertook a project to build and improve on the exit ramp from the Outer Loop (I-64 westbound, from Chesapeake towards Norfolk/Hampton) to eastbound I-264. The single lane exit ramp is typically highly congested during peak traffic hours due to the fact that it requires vehicles exiting onto I-264 to weave merge into a collector-distributor lane which carries traffic exiting to nearby Virginia State Route 403 (Newtown Road). Plans call for adding a second Outer Loop exit lane and widening of the exit ramp from one to two lanes. The project will also build a new, two lane collector distributor road for traffic exiting to Newtown Road, while allowing traffic from the Outer Loop to connect to the old collector-distributor lanes without weaving through traffic. The projects expected cost is $158 million, and should be completed by October 2019.

=== High Occupancy - Toll (HOT) lane conversion ===
As part of the I-64 Express Lanes project, the Hampton Roads Beltway will see the conversion of all of its HOV lanes to HOT lanes. Segment 1 will convert the 2 lane reversible roadway in Norfolk between the I-64/I-564 interchange and the I-64/I-264 interchange to HOT-2 lanes, Segment 2 would convert the single HOV-2 diamond lane in each direction to HOT-2 lanes, and will extend those lanes across the new High Rise Bridge to the Bowers Hill interchange, and Segment 3 would continue the project from the I-564/I-64 interchange in Norfolk across the Hampton Roads to the I-64/I-664 interchange in Newport News.

Segment 1 is currently the only completed section. Segment 2 is currently under construction as part of the I-64 Southside Widening and the Segment 3 as part of the HRBT Expansion in 2024.
