= Outer ring road =

Several cities include one or more outer ring roads, including:

== Australia ==
- Outer Metropolitan Ring Road, Melbourne

== China ==
- S20 Outer Ring Expressway in Shanghai
- Outer Ring Road (Tianjin)

== India ==
- Outer Ring Road, Amaravati
- Outer Ring Road, Bangalore
- Outer Ring Road, Chennai
- Outer Ring Road, Delhi
- Outer Ring Road, Erode
- Outer Ring Road, Hyderabad
- Outer Ring Road, Nagpur
- Thiruvananthapuram Outer Ring Road
- Outer Ring Road, Warangal

== Indonesia ==
- Jakarta Outer Ring Road
- Jakarta Outer Ring Road 2

== Ireland ==
- The R136 road in Dublin

== Kenya ==
- Outer Ring Road, Nairobi

== Malaysia ==
- KLIA Outer Ring Road in Sepang
- Kuala Lumpur Outer Ring Road in Kuala Lumpur
- Penang Outer Ring Road in George Town
- Butterworth Outer Ring Road

== Singapore ==
- The Outer Ring Road System

== South Africa ==
- Durban Outer Ring Road

== Thailand ==
- Kanchanaphisek Road, also known as the Bangkok Outer Ring Road

== United Kingdom ==
- The A4040 road in Birmingham
- Leeds Outer Ring Road
- Sheffield Outer Ring Road
