= Outer Ring =

Outer Ring may refer to:

- Outer Ring (Munich), a ring road in Germany
- Berlin outer ring, a railway line in Germany
- Monoceros Ring, a formation in space

== See also ==
- Outer ring road (disambiguation)
