= Newport News Middle Ground Light =

Lighthouse in Virginia, United States

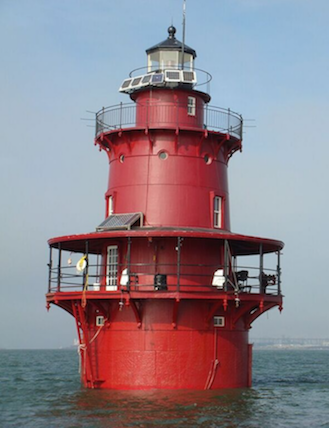
- 1997 photograph of Newport News Middle Ground Light, Virginia (NPS)
- Location: East of the Monitor-Merrimac Memorial Bridge-Tunnel in Hampton Roads
- Coordinates: 36°56′42″N 76°23′30″W

Tower
- Constructed: 1891
- Foundation: Pneumatic wooden caisson
- Construction: Cast iron
- Automated: 1954
- Height: 70 feet (21 m)
- Shape: Round "spark plug"
- Heritage: National Register of Historic Places listed place, Virginia Historic Landmark

Light
- First lit: 1891
- Focal height: 52 feet (16 m)
- Lens: Fourth order Fresnel lens (original), Vega VRB-25 solar-powered beacon (current)
- Range: 12 nautical miles (22 km; 14 mi)
- Characteristic: Flashing Red, 10 seconds
- Newport News Middle Ground Light Station
- U.S. National Register of Historic Places
- Virginia Landmarks Register
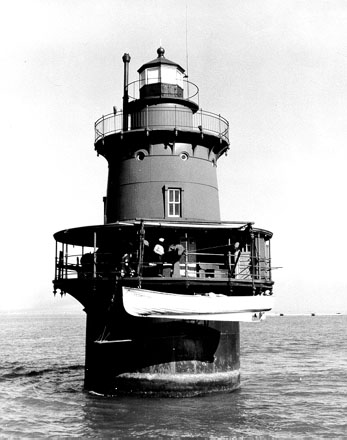
- Nearest city: Newport News, Virginia
- Area: Less than 1 acre (0.40 ha)
- Architect: US Lighthouse Board
- MPS: Light Stations of the United States MPS
- NRHP reference No.: 02001438
- VLR No.: 121-0020

Significant dates
- Added to NRHP: December 2, 2002
- Designated VLR: September 10, 2003

Newport News Middle Ground Light is a lighthouse near the Monitor–Merrimac Memorial Bridge–Tunnel (MMMBT) on Interstate 664 in Hampton Roads. It is the oldest caisson lighthouse in Virginia.

== History ==
An L-shaped shoal sits in the middle of major shipping lanes just off the coast of Hampton Roads, Virginia, creating a hazard in the 1880s as ships drew more water. The US Lighthouse Board identified the need for a lighthouse in this area in 1887, and, after several economizing changes to the design, construction began in 1890 and was completed in the spring of the following year. This was the first sparkplug lighthouse built in Virginia.

The station was automated in 1954, at which time the light and fog bell were altered. The light flashed a white 3,000 candlepower every six seconds, and the fog bell sounded one stroke every 15 seconds, instead of two. The lighthouse was also downgraded, with the Coast Guard reclassifing it as a "second class tall nun buoy". This marked the beginning of a period of neglect. In 1979, the now unstaffed light was struck by a tugboat, and an inspection in 1982 showed serious damage to the first floor gallery and leaks into the foundation. Broken and jammed windows and doors allowed seagulls into the interior. Some repairs were made, but more significant changes were made in 1986–1987 when the light was converted to solar power. The new beacon was placed outside the lantern, and, the following year, a more substantial renovation was done in an effort to remedy the damage and neglect. However, inspections in 1992 and 1994 showed that the decline of the light continued.

Construction of the MMMBT produced a background to the light which tended to obscure it. In 2000, the beacon was returned to the interior of the lantern, and the characteristic changed to red in order to make it more visible against the bridge's lights.

This light was offered to nonprofit groups under the National Historic Lighthouse Preservation Act in 2002. Two applications were submitted in 2003 but were not accepted. In 2005, the lighthouse was put up for auction and was purchased by the Billingsley and Gonsoulin families with a final bid of $31,000. The families renovated the lighthouse and used it as a vacation home. The Coast Guard continued to maintain the light.

In May 2026, the lighthouse was offered for sale, with an asking price of $995,000.

== Sources ==
- Newport News Middle Ground Lighthouse, Virginia from LighthouseFriends.com
- de Gast, Robert (1973). The Lighthouses of the Chesapeake. Baltimore: Johns Hopkins University Press.
- Chesapeake Bay Lighthouse Project
