= Virginia State Route 135 =

State highway in the City of Suffolk, Virginia, US

State Route 135
- College Drive

Route information
- Maintained by VDOT
- Length: 2.20 mi (3.54 km)
- Existed: 1950s–present

Major junctions
- South end: US 17 in Suffolk
- SR 164 in Suffolk; I-664 in Suffolk
- North end: SR 367 at Tidewater Community College in Suffolk

Location
- Country: United States
- State: Virginia
- Counties: City of Suffolk

Highway system
- Virginia Routes; Interstate; US; Primary; Secondary; Byways; History; HOT lanes
← SR 134	→ SR 136

State Route 135 (SR 135) is a primary state highway in the U.S. state of Virginia. Known as College Drive, the state highway runs 2.20 miles (3.54 km) from U.S. Route 17 (US 17) north to the entrance of Tidewater Community College, where the highway continues as SR 367, within the independent city of Suffolk. In addition to providing access to the community college's Suffolk location, SR 135 connects US 17 with SR 164 and Interstate 664 (I-664).

== Route description ==
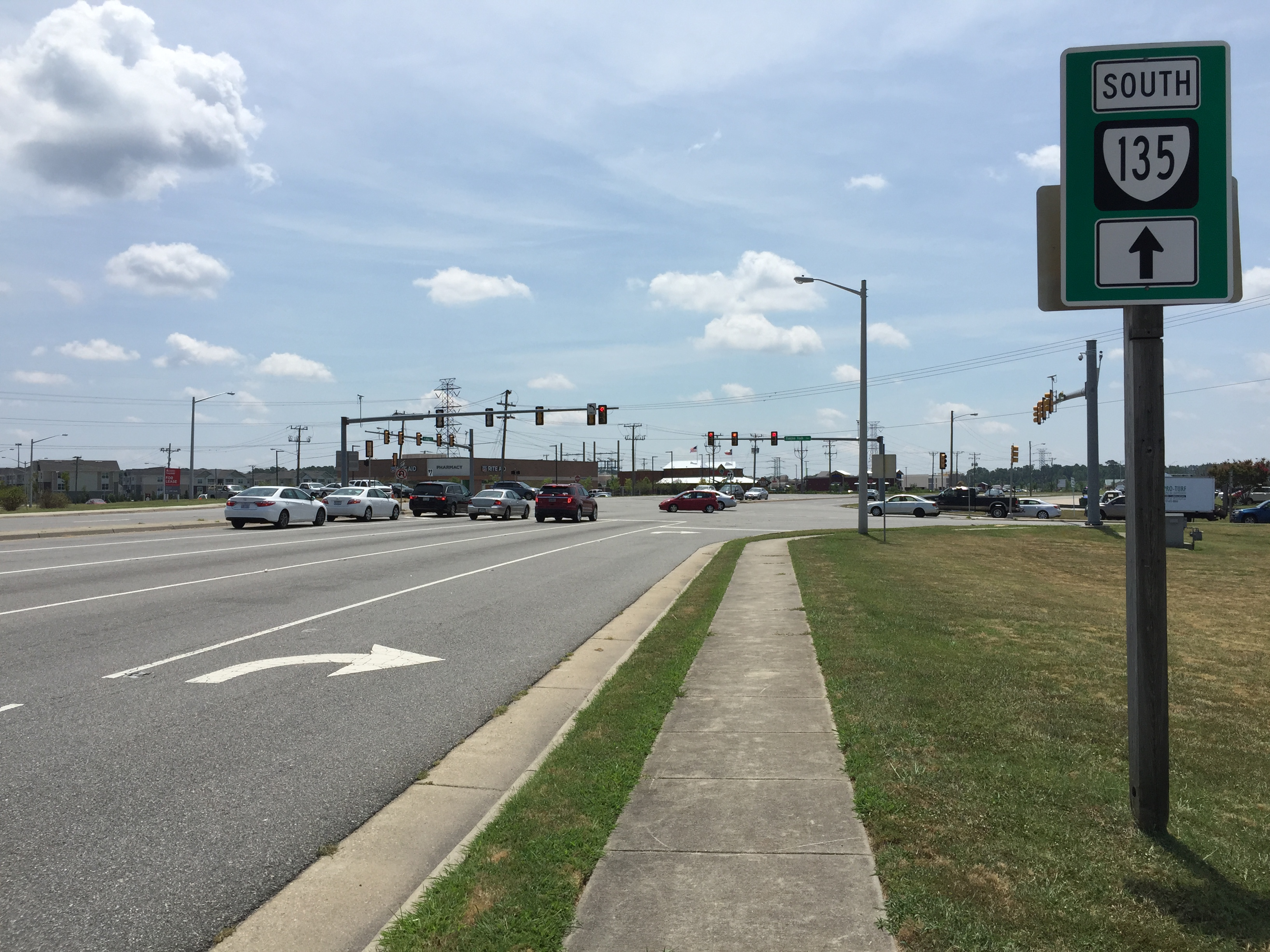
View south along SR 135 at Hampton Roads Parkway in Suffolk

SR 135 begins at an intersection with US 17 (Bridge Road) to the west of the village of Churchland. The intersection is very close to the tripoint of the boundaries of the independent cities of Suffolk, Chesapeake, and Portsmouth. SR 135 heads north as a four-lane divided highway and immediately has a partial diamond interchange that allows access to SR 164 (Western Freeway) to and from the east. The state highway passes the Tri-cities Higher Education Center, a satellite campus of Old Dominion University, and passes through a commercial area. SR 135 meets I-664 (Hampton Roads Beltway) at an oblique cloverleaf interchange; this interchange is the first junction for I-664 south of the Monitor-Merrimac Memorial Bridge-Tunnel. The state highway reduces to two lanes for the final stretch to its northern terminus at the entrance of the Tidewater Community College's Regional Workforce Development Center and Truck Driver Training Site, which fronts Hampton Roads at Pig Point. College Drive continues onto campus as SR 367.

== Major intersections ==
The entire route is in Suffolk.

mi	km	Destinations	Notes
0.00	0.00	US 17 (Bridge Road)	Southern terminus
0.20	0.32	SR 164 east – Downtown Portsmouth	interchange
1.61	2.59	I-664 – Chesapeake, Newport News, Hampton	Exit 8 (I-664)
2.20	3.54	College Drive (SR 367) – Tidewater Community College	Northern terminus
1.000 mi = 1.609 km; 1.000 km = 0.621 mi: Incomplete access
