= Outer Ring Road, Warangal =

Road in Telangana, India

Route information
- Length: 69 km (43 mi)

Location
- Country: India
- States: Telangana

Highway system
- Roads in India; Expressways; National; State; Asian

The Outer Ring Road is a 69-kilometre (43 mi) long ring road expressway under construction, encircling the city of Warangal, Telangana, India.

== History ==
The foundation of the expressway was laid by the Chief Minister of Telangana, K. Chandrashekar Rao in October 2017. The 69-kilometre (43 mi) long is constructed jointly by National Highways Authority of India (NHAI) and R&B Department of the government of Telangana. NHAI took up the construction of 29-kilometre (18 mi) stretch which would act as a bypass of National Highway 163 while the remaining 40-kilometre (25 mi) would be constructed by R&B. The total estimated cost of the project is ₹7 billion.

== Progress ==
As of March 2020, construction of. NH bypass stretch of the expressway is completed.
