= Mallow, Virginia =

Unincorporated community in Virginia, United States

Coordinates: 37°46′15″N 79°58′21″W

- Census-designated place
- Location within Virginia Location within the United States
- Country: United States
- State: Virginia
- Counties: Alleghany
- Elevation: 1,214 ft (370 m)

Population (2020)
  - Total: 671
- Time zone: UTC-5 (Eastern (EST))
  - Summer (DST): UTC-4 (EDT)
- GNIS feature ID: 2807402

Mallow is an unincorporated community and census-designated place in Alleghany County, Virginia, United States. It was first listed as a CDP in the 2020 census with a population of 671.

== Demographics ==
Historical population
Census	Pop.	Note	%±
1950	389		—
2020	671		—
U.S. Decennial Census; 1950 1960 1970; 1980 2010

A community named Fairlawn-Mallow was listed as an unincorporated community in the 1950 U.S. census (pop 389). It was not listed in subsequent censuses until it appeared as a census designated place under the name Mallow in the 2020 U.S. census.

=== Racial and ethnic composition ===
Mallow CDP, Virginia – Racial and ethnic composition Note: the US Census treats Hispanic/Latino as an ethnic category. This table excludes Latinos from the racial categories and assigns them to a separate category. Hispanics/Latinos may be of any race.
Race / Ethnicity (NH = Non-Hispanic)	Pop 2020	2020
White alone (NH)	597	88.97%
Black or African American alone (NH)	37	5.51%
Native American or Alaska Native alone (NH)	0	0.00%
Asian alone (NH)	5	0.75%
Native Hawaiian or Pacific Islander alone (NH)	0	0.00%
Other race alone (NH)	1	0.15%
Mixed race or Multiracial (NH)	20	2.98%
Hispanic or Latino (any race)	11	1.64%
Total	671	100.00%
