= Interstate 664 =

Highway in Virginia

Interstate 664
- Hampton Roads Beltway
- I-664 highlighted in red

Route information
- Auxiliary route of I-64
- Maintained by VDOT
- Length: 20.79 mi (33.46 km)
- Existed: 1971–present
- NHS: Entire route

Major junctions
- South end: I-64 / I-264 in Chesapeake
- US 13 / US 58 / US 460 / SR 191 in Chesapeake; SR 337 in Chesapeake; SR 164 / US 17 in Suffolk; US 60 in Newport News
- North end: I-64 in Hampton

Location
- Country: United States
- State: Virginia
- Counties: City of Chesapeake, City of Suffolk, City of Newport News, City of Hampton

Highway system
- Interstate Highway System; Main; Auxiliary; Suffixed; Business; Future; Virginia Routes; Interstate; US; Primary; Secondary; Byways; History; HOT lanes
← SR 598	→ SR 895

Interstate 664 (I-664) is an auxiliary Interstate Highway in the US state of Virginia. The Interstate runs 20.79 miles (33.46 km) from I-64 and I-264 in Chesapeake north to I-64 in Hampton. I-664 forms the west side of the Hampton Roads Beltway, a circumferential highway serving the Hampton Roads metropolitan area. The Interstate crosses Hampton Roads via the Monitor–Merrimac Memorial Bridge–Tunnel (MMMBT) between Suffolk and Newport News. I-664 is connected to the other major cities of the metropolitan area—Portsmouth, Norfolk, and Virginia Beach—by I-264. The Interstate also has a connection to Portsmouth through State Route 164 (SR 164) and to Suffolk via U.S. Route 13 (US 13), US 58, and US 460.

== Route description ==
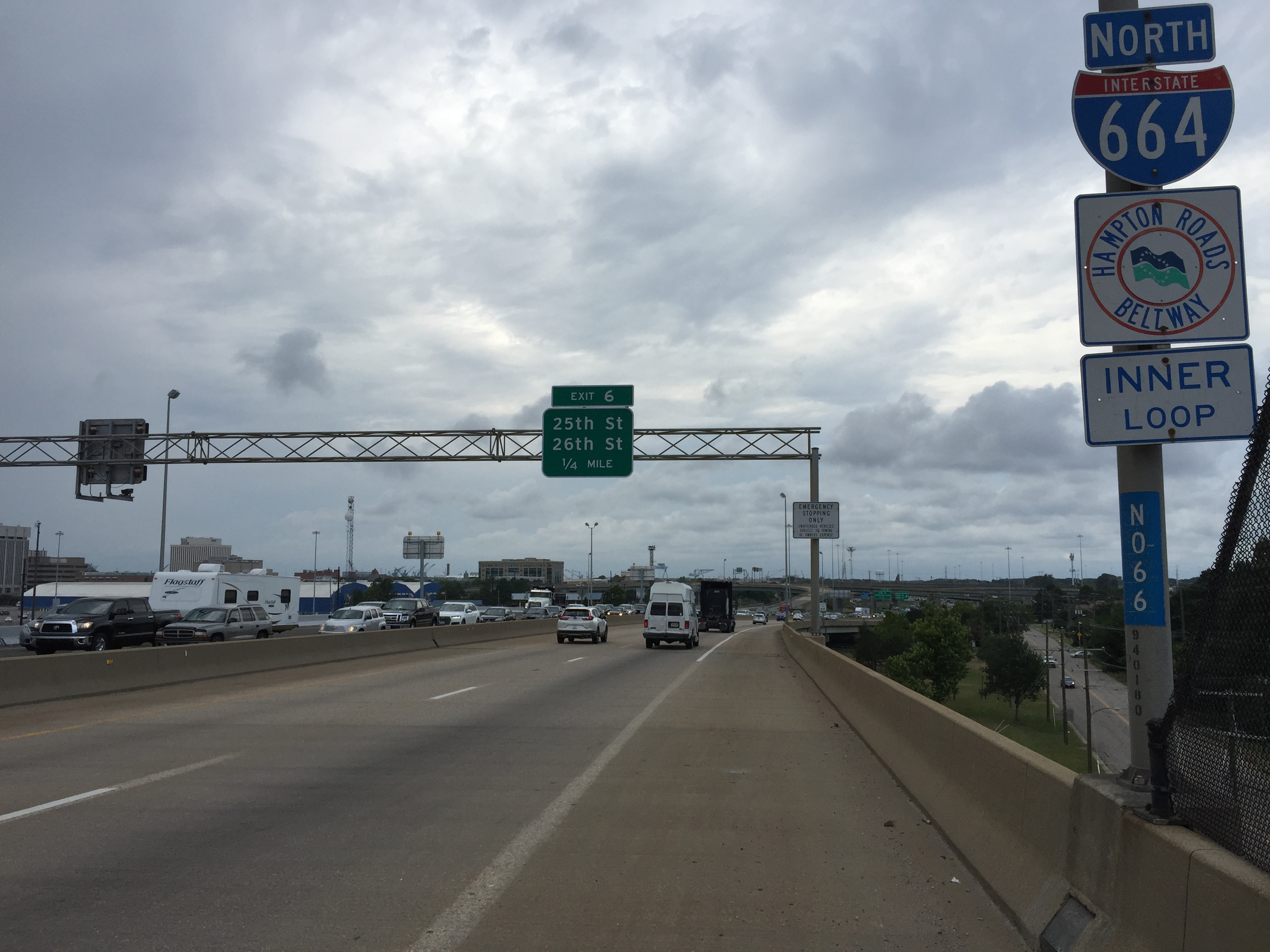
View north along I-664 between Terminal Avenue and US 60 in Newport News

I-664 begins at a full Y interchange with I-64 and I-264 that serves as the terminus of all three Interstates in the Bower's Hill section of the city of Chesapeake. I-64 heads southeast as a continuation of the Hampton Roads Beltway through Chesapeake while I-264 heads east toward Portsmouth and Norfolk. I-664 heads west as an eight-lane freeway that has a southbound-only exit ramp to US 13 and US 460 (Military Highway) and crosses over Military Highway and a Norfolk Southern Railway rail line. The Interstate has a cloverleaf interchange with Military Highway, which here carries US 58 in addition to US 13 and US 460. The interchange also provides access to U.S. Route 460 Alternate (US 460 Alt.), which follows US 58 east into Portsmouth. I-664 curves north as a four-lane freeway that crosses Goose Creek and has a diamond interchange with SR 663 (Dock Landing Road) and a cloverleaf interchange with SR 337 (Portsmouth Boulevard).

Just south of its partial cloverleaf interchange with SR 659 (Pughsville Road), I-664 crosses a rail line; a spur from that rail line heads north in the median of the freeway as the highway enters the city of Suffolk. The rail spur leaves the median and heads northeast toward Portsmouth just south of its interchange with SR 164 (Western Freeway) and US 17 (Bridge Road). SR 164 heads east toward downtown Portsmouth while US 17 heads northwest to the James River Bridge. There is no access from southbound I-664 to southbound US 17; that movement is made via the next interchange, a cloverleaf interchange with SR 135 (College Drive) that serves the satellite campus of Old Dominion University and the community of Churchland.

North of SR 135, northbound I-664 has a vehicle inspection station and crossovers before the highway enters the MMMBT. The bridge–tunnel passes to the west of Craney Island, an artificial island in the city of Portsmouth that lies to the west of the mouth of the Elizabeth River. West of the highway is the confluence of the James River and Nansemond River to form Hampton Roads, as well as the James River Bridge a short distance to the north on the namesake river. I-664 heads north-northeast along a causeway for three miles (4.8 km) to a point west of the Newport News Middle Ground Light, where the pair of bridges curve to the north-northwest onto an artificial island where the highway descends into a pair of tunnels under the estuary's main shipping channel. The Interstate resurfaces on another artificial island at Newport News Point east of the coal piers in the city of Newport News.

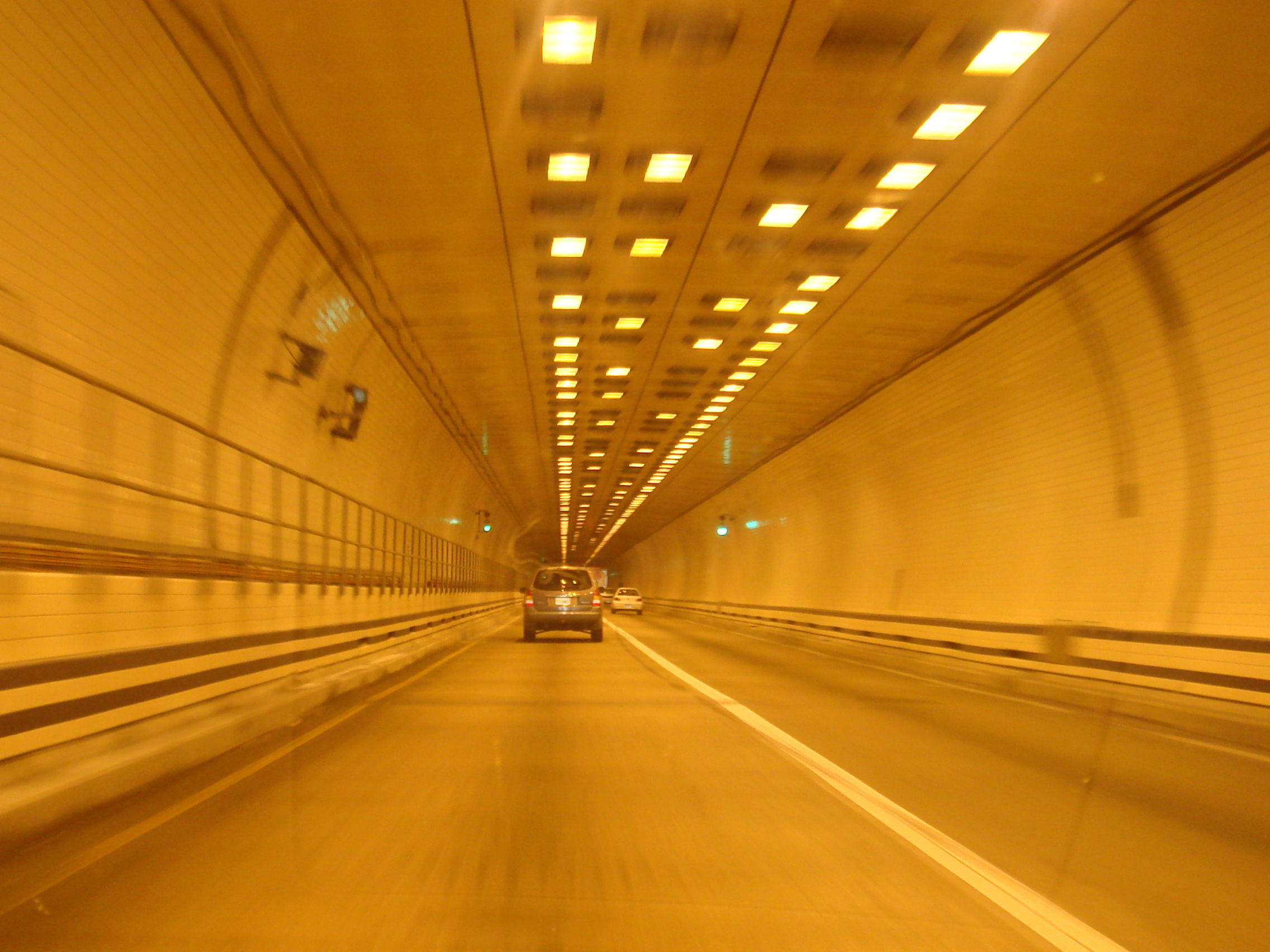
The MMMBT

I-664 has a southbound vehicle inspection station adjacent to its first interchange in Newport News with Terminal Avenue. The Interstate parallels the southern end of CSX's Peninsula Subdivision as it passes through interchanges with several streets to the east of downtown Newport News. The southern interchange has ramps to and from 25th, 26th, and 27th streets; the first two streets carry eastbound and westbound US 60, which is unmarked from I-664. The northern interchange has ramps to and from 35th Street and Jefferson Avenue; Jefferson Avenue is SR 143, which is also unmarked from the Interstate. I-664 curves east as a six-lane freeway away from the railroad and has an oblique crossing of SR 351 (39th Street) prior to half diamond interchanges with Roanoke Avenue and Chestnut Avenue. The Interstate enters the city of Hampton and has diamond interchanges with Aberdeen Road and Powhatan Parkway before reaching its northern terminus at I-64. I-664 meets its parent highway at a directional Y interchange above Newmarket Creek just south of Hampton Coliseum. The Hampton Roads Beltway continues east along I-64 through Hampton before crossing Hampton Roads on the Hampton Roads Bridge–Tunnel (HRBT) into the city of Norfolk.

== History ==
I-664 was completed in sections, beginning in 1971 with the construction of the "Tunnel Road" section, which led from Aberdeen Road to I-64. The road was built to lead northbound traffic from I-64 and the HRBT to downtown Newport News.

The interchange at I-64 was rebuilt as a partial stack interchange in 1980.

I-664 was completed in sections by 1989, between Aberdeen Road and the 26th/27th street exit ramps in downtown Newport News.

I-664 was completed in Suffolk and Chesapeake in 1990 between US 17 and Pughsville Road.

With the opening of the MMMBT on April 30, 1992, I-664 was almost complete.

I-664 between Pughsville Road and the Bower's Hill interchange was completed in 1993, thus completing I-664 as a whole.

== Exit list ==
The exit numbering sequence on I-664 breaks two conventions for Interstate highways. First, I-664 uses a sequential numbering pattern while most Interstates utilize a mileage-based pattern. Second, exit 1 is at I-664's northern end, in contrast with the convention of beginning exits for north–south highways at the highway's southern end.

County	Location	mi	km	Exit	Destinations	Notes
City of Chesapeake		20.79	33.46	15	I-64 west (Hampton Roads Beltway) – Chesapeake, Virginia Beach I-264 east – Portsmouth, Norfolk	Southern terminus; eastern terminus of I-64; western terminus of I-264; signed as exits 15B (west) and 15A (east)
City of Chesapeake		19.89	32.01	14	US 13 north / US 460 east (Military Highway)	Southbound exit only
City of Chesapeake		1.21	1.95	13	US 13 / US 460 / US 58 (Military Highway) / SR 191 north to US 460 Alt. – Bowers Hill, Suffolk	Signed as exits 13B (north/east) and 13A (south/west)
City of Chesapeake		2.69	4.33	12	SR 663 (Dock Landing Road)	
City of Chesapeake		3.72	5.99	11	SR 337 (Portsmouth Boulevard) – Portsmouth	Signed as exits 11B (east) and 11A (west)
City of Chesapeake		5.82	9.37	10	SR 659 (Pughsville Road)	
City of Suffolk		7.41	11.93	9	US 17 / SR 164 east – Portsmouth, James River Bridge	Signed as exits 9B (south) and 9A (north) northbound; no southbound access to US 17 south
City of Suffolk		8.45	13.60	8	SR 135 (College Drive) to US 17 south – Churchland	Signed as exits 8B (south) and 8A (north)
Hampton Roads				Monitor-Merrimac Memorial Bridge-Tunnel		
City of Newport News		14.84	23.88	7	Terminal Avenue	
City of Newport News				6	US 60 (25th Street / 26th Street) / 27th Street	
City of Newport News		16.25	26.15	5	US 60 / 35th Street	
City of Newport News				5	Jefferson Avenue (SR 143)	Northbound exit and southbound entrance
City of Newport News		17.03– 17.41	27.41– 28.02	4	Chestnut Avenue / Roanoke Avenue	
City of Hampton		17.86	28.74	3	Aberdeen Road	
City of Hampton		19.13	30.79	2	Power Plant Parkway / Powhatan Parkway	
City of Hampton		20.79	33.46	1A	I-64 west – Williamsburg, Richmond, NN/Williamsburg Airport	Northbound exit and southbound entrance; I-64 exit 264
City of Hampton		20.79	33.46	1B	I-64 east (Hampton Roads Beltway inner loop) – Norfolk, Virginia Beach	Northern terminus
1.000 mi = 1.609 km; 1.000 km = 0.621 mi: Incomplete access
