= Inner Circle (board game) =

Board game

Inner Circle is a board game for two to four players, first published in 1981 by Milton Bradley and designed by Virginia Charves and Wayne J. Yee. Inner Circle uses a modular, four-level board design. Each level is hexagonal, with holes (referred to in the game as "survival spots") that allow playing pieces to pass from the current level to the next. Movement spaces are marked with different numbers of dots ranging from one to four, which indicate the number of spaces that a pawn occupying a space must move. The number of survival spots decreases from one level to the next, with only one spot on the fourth level; the goal is to occupy that spot.

== Gameplay ==
The four board levels are stacked in order, with the first level on top, and each player receives an equal number of pawns (nine for a two-player game, six for three players, and four for four players). To begin the game, the players take turns placing one pawn at a time in the spaces around the perimeter of the board. Once all the pawns are in place, players take turns moving one pawn at a time in a straight line, following the number of dots on the original space. Players are not allowed to land in an occupied space but may jump over any other pawns during a move. Peeking under a pawn is not allowed; once a pawn is lifted, the player must either make a complete move if possible or lose his/her turn. Any player landing in the unmarked central space must immediately move that same pawn up to four spaces in any direction.

Once a pawn lands in a survival spot, it cannot be moved again for the rest of the level. After all the survival spots on a level are filled, the board is lifted away and any pawns not in those spots are removed from the game. Play continues as before, with each level having fewer survival spots. The fourth level has only one survival spot at its center, rather than an unmarked space; the winner is the first player to land a pawn there. If one player fills all the survival spots on an earlier level with his/her own pawns, though, the game ends immediately and he/she wins by default.

== Reception ==
Games magazine included Inner Circle in their "Top 100 Games of 1981", praising it as a "new board game for two to four players" that "requires concentration".
