= Monitor–Merrimac Memorial Bridge–Tunnel =

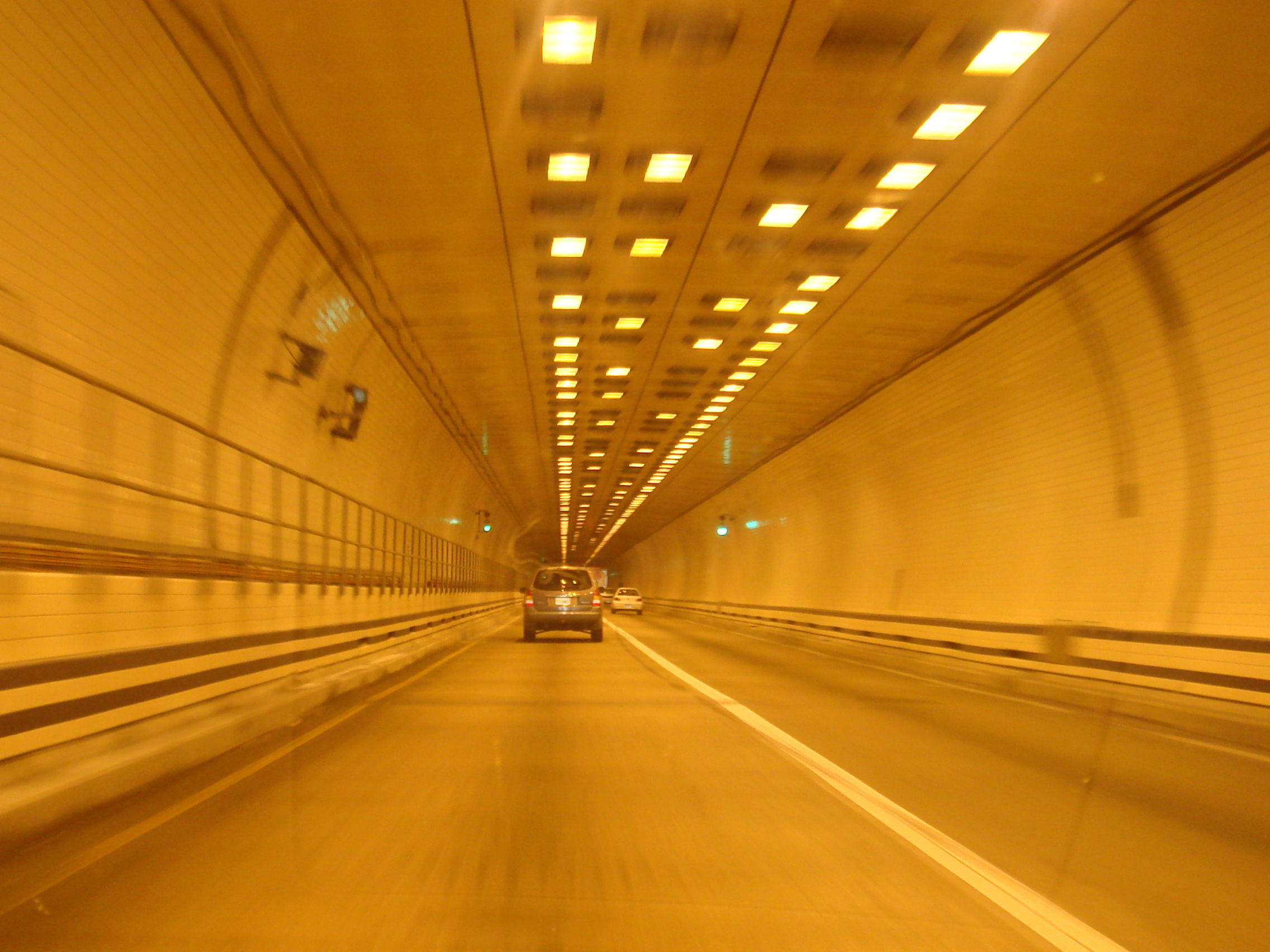
- Southbound side of the tunnel in 2006
- Coordinates: 36°56′27″N 76°24′06″W
- Carries: I-664
- Crosses: Hampton Roads
- Locale: Suffolk to Newport News, Virginia
- Maintained by: Virginia Department of Transportation

Characteristics
- Design: Composite: low-level trestle, double-tube tunnel, artificial islands
- Total length: 4.6 mi (7.4 km)
- Clearance above: 14 ft 6 in (4.42 m)
- No. of lanes: 4

History
- Opened: April 30, 1992; 34 years ago

Location
- Interactive map of Monitor–Merrimac Memorial Bridge–Tunnel

The Monitor–Merrimac Memorial Bridge–Tunnel (MMMBT) is the 4.6-mile-long (7.4 km) Hampton Roads crossing for Interstate 664 (I-664) in the southeastern portion of Virginia in the United States. It is a four-lane bridge–tunnel composed of bridges, trestles, artificial islands, and tunnels under a portion of the Hampton Roads harbor where the mouths of the James, Nansemond, and Elizabeth rivers come together.

It connects the independent cities of Newport News on the Virginia Peninsula and Suffolk in South Hampton Roads and is part of the Hampton Roads Beltway, a circumferential Interstate Highway which links the seven largest cities of Hampton Roads.

The MMMBT, completed in 1992, provided a third major vehicle crossing of the Hampton Roads harbor area, supplementing the Hampton Roads Bridge–Tunnel which carries I-64 between the independent cities of Hampton and Norfolk (1957), and the James River Bridge connecting the independent city of Newport News and Isle of Wight County in the South Hampton Roads region (1928).

The MMMBT cost $400 million to build, and it includes a four-lane tunnel that is 4,800 feet (1,500 m) long, two artificial portal islands, and 3.2 miles (5.1 km) of twin trestle. It was the largest public project in Virginia history at the time in was built.

== Battle of Hampton Roads ==
Map of I-664

The MMMBT is named for the two ironclad warships which engaged in the famous Battle of Hampton Roads on March 8–9, 1862, during the US Civil War. The battle took place between USS Monitor and CSS Virginia. The latter ship had been rebuilt from the wreck of USS Merrimack. The site of the battle was within one mile (1.6 km) of the bridge–tunnel structure named by the Commonwealth of Virginia as a memorial.

== See also ==
- List of bridges
- Lists of tunnels
- List of bridge–tunnels
