= Three circles =

Type of diagram related to behavioral addiction

The three circles is an exercise / diagram used by recovering addicts to describe and define behaviors that lead either to a relapse into or recovery from addictive behaviors. Some treatment groups and twelve-step recovery programs related to behavioral addictions encourage recovering addicts to complete the three circle exercise to help the addict identify behaviors that promote or endanger their sobriety. The first use of the term is found in a pamphlet publication of Sex Addicts Anonymous, entitled "Three circles: Defining sobriety in S.A.A." Minneapolis, MN: SAA Literature (1991). It has since been republished.

When creating the three circles diagram, the addict draws three concentric circles, one inside the other (like a bull's eye). The addict then lists behaviors in each of the circles that reset, endanger or promote their sobriety. The circles may also be referred to as "lines". Where "top line" corresponds to the outer circle, "middle line" corresponds to the middle circle and "bottom line" corresponds to the inner circle.

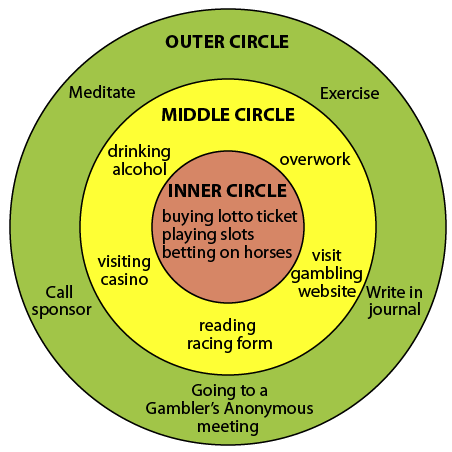

Inner Circle (or bottom line)
The addict lists behaviors they want to stop engaging in in the inner-most circle. Engaging in any of these "inner circle" or "bottom-line" behaviors would result in a loss of sobriety for the addict. Addicts typically consider their "sobriety date" to be the last day they engaged in these "inner circle" behaviors.

Middle Circle (or middle line)
The addict then lists "middle line" or "boundary behaviors" in the second or "middle circle." These include behaviors that may or may not be appropriate but lead to the bottom line behaviors listed in the inner circle. Examples of middle-circle behaviors include not getting enough sleep, overwork, procrastination, etc.

Outer Circle (or top line)
Finally, the addict list their "top lines" or healthy behaviors in the "outer circle." These "outer circle" behaviors lead the addict away from the objectionable behavior listed in the inner circle. Examples include going to a recovery meeting, calling one's sponsor or other person in the addict's support group, spiritual reading, recovery writing, etc.

This visual image of three circles can help addicts realize when they are in trouble and what they need to do to move closer to their definition of a healthy behavior.
