= Inner–outer directions =

Method of labeling direction of travel for geographic loops

In nations that drive on the right, traffic flows clockwise in the inner lanes (blue) of a beltway and counterclockwise in the outer lanes (red).

In nations that drive on the left, traffic flows counterclockwise in the inner lanes (blue) of a beltway and clockwise in the outer lanes (red).

Inner–outer directions are labels that identify the direction of travel on opposing lanes of traffic on certain ring roads or beltways. They can be used to sign individual routes that encircle a city or metropolitan area, where east–west and north–south orientations cannot be applied uniformly. The labels are also used in select double track rail systems that form a loop, indicating the direction of travel of each line.

Variations of the labels include "inner loop" or "outer loop", "inner beltline" or "outer beltline", "inner ring" or "outer ring", "inner rail" or "outer rail", and "inner circle" or "outer circle".

In 2009, Interstate 277 in Charlotte, North Carolina, became the first non-contiguous loop route to utilize inner–outer directional signage.

== Concept ==
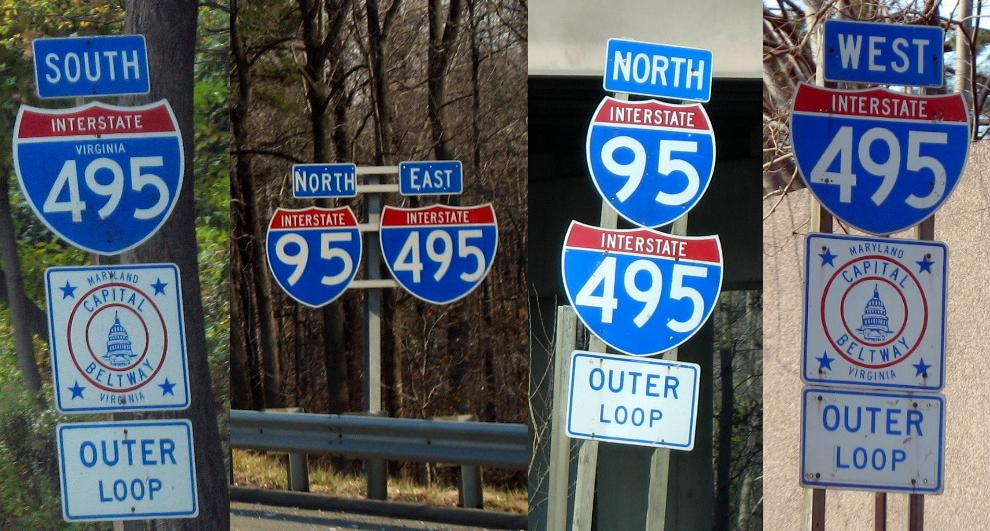
The Capital Beltway around Washington, D.C., is signed by all four compass directions at various points, but is consistently signed with inner–outer labeling.

In nations where automobiles drive on the right side of a road, traffic traveling in a clockwise direction around a loop will always be in the "inner" lane(s) (assuming that there is no lane crossing). Likewise, traffic traveling in a counterclockwise direction will always be in the "outer" lane(s). "Inner" and "outer" labels stem from this reasoning, applying the concept of concentric loops to the geographic characteristics of circular road or rail.

== Criticism and alternatives ==
Despite the logical benefits and uniformity of inner/outer labeling, many find the concept confusing, especially those in nations where compass directions (e.g., east and west) are by far more commonly used to sign routes (e.g. the United States). More confusion can occur in places where more than one route encircles an area (such as Houston, which is encircled by Interstate 610 and the Sam Houston Tollway); the outermost route may be called an Outer Loop and the innermost route may be called an Inner Loop (like in Rochester, New York), causing confusion with the labels. The labeling system is also rarely used, so travelers are largely unfamiliar with the terms. As a result, most applications of inner and outer are secondary to compass directions, which change as one travels along the loop.

Most beltways in the United States do not use inner–outer directions, since compass directions are the predominant way to designate direction on numbered routes. Beltways with a single number for the entire route, such as Interstate 285 in the Atlanta area, are generally given compass directions that change as one travels along the route (what would be the inner loop is instead posted as north, then east, then south, then west, and vice versa for the outer loop).

A special case is the beltway for Twin Cities which was numbered before it was common to use a single number for an entire beltway. That road is split into northern and southern halves for numbering purposes, with Interstate 694 assigned to the northern and eastern half and Interstate 494 assigned to the southern and western half. Both halves are posted with east and west directions on their entire lengths. However, the milemarkers for those Interstates treat them as a single highway, beginning at the Minnesota River bridge on I-494, increasing going clockwise and including I-694, returning to the Minnesota River bridge on I-494.

The Meijō Line in Nagoya, Japan uses the terms clockwise and counterclockwise.

Hong Kong's Transport Department employs yet another method of orbital road signing: clockwise traffic on Route 9 is denoted by the letter "A", while counterclockwise traffic is denoted by the letter "B".

== Examples ==
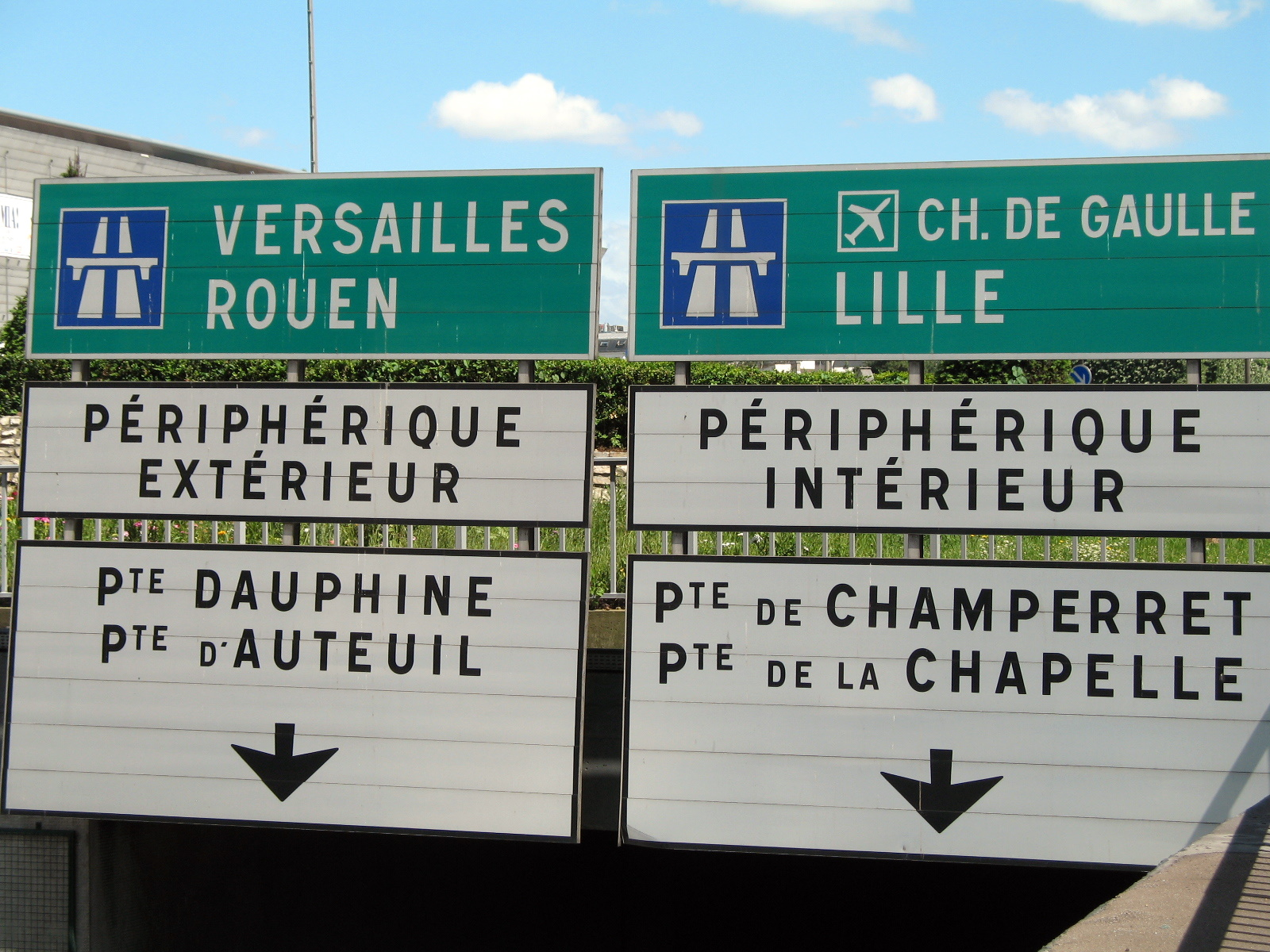
The Boulevard Périphérique around Paris, France is signed with inner and outer (French: intérieur and extérieur) labelling. Roads in France are not given compass directions.

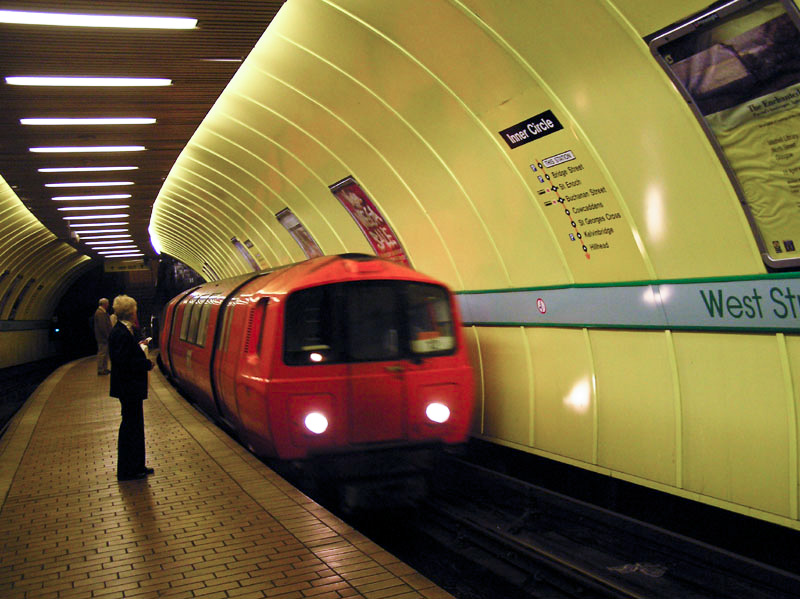
An "Inner Circle" train (note signage) arrives at West Street subway station on the Glasgow Subway.

Inner and outer directions may be used as the primary labeling system for routes or as a system secondary to another system such as compass directions.

=== Primary labeling system ===
Right-hand traffic (the inner loop is clockwise) :

- Georgia State Route 10 Loop encircling Athens, Georgia, United States
- Hampton Roads Beltway encircling the Hampton Roads area, United States
- The Boulevard Périphérique around Paris, France
- Interstate 485 encircling the Charlotte, North Carolina, metropolitan area, United States
- Interstate 277 partially encircling Uptown Charlotte, North Carolina, United States
- Seoul Subway Line 2 in Seoul, Korea

Left-hand traffic (the outer loop is clockwise) :

- Glasgow Subway, Scotland
- Yamanote Line in Tokyo, Japan
- Osaka Loop Line in Osaka, Japan
- MRT Circle Line in Kuala Lumpur, Malaysia
- Circle Line in Singapore

=== Secondary labeling system ===
- Interstate 495 (Capital Beltway) encircling Washington, D.C., United States
- Interstate 695 encircling Baltimore, Maryland
- London Underground's Circle line, London, England

=== Former labeling system ===
- Interstate 440 encircling Raleigh, North Carolina, United States, (pioneered the inner–outer directional system for highways; highway truncated in 2008, labels being phased out and replaced with east/west orientation in order to avoid confusion with the newly constructed "Outer Loop", Interstate 540)

== See also ==
- Ring road
- Roundabout
