= Hampton Roads Bridge–Tunnel =

Roadway connecting the Virginia cities of Norfolk and Hampton

- Westbound in the tunnel
- Coordinates: 36°59′14″N 76°18′20″W
- Carries: I-64 / US 60
- Crosses: Hampton Roads
- Locale: Norfolk to Hampton, Virginia
- Maintained by: Virginia Department of Transportation

Characteristics
- Design: Composite: low-level trestle, parallel single-tube tunnels, artificial islands
- Total length: 3.5 mi (5.6 km)
- Clearance above: 14 ft 6 in (4.42 m) (eastbound); 13 ft 6 in (4.11 m) (westbound)
- No. of lanes: 4 total: 2 westbound, 2 eastbound

History
- Opened: November 1, 1957; 68 years ago (westbound); November 1, 1976; 49 years ago (eastbound)

Location
- Interactive map of Hampton Roads Bridge–Tunnel

The Hampton Roads Bridge–Tunnel (HRBT) is a 3.5-mile-long (5.6 km) Hampton Roads crossing for Interstate 64 (I-64) and US Route 60 (US 60). It is a four-lane facility comprising bridges, trestles, artificial islands, and tunnels under the main shipping channels for Hampton Roads harbor in the southeastern portion of Virginia in the United States.

It connects the historic Phoebus area of the independent city of Hampton near Fort Monroe on the Virginia Peninsula with Willoughby Spit in the city of Norfolk in South Hampton Roads and is part of the Hampton Roads Beltway.

== History and design ==
Prior to the opening of the HRBT (and well before even the HRBT's counterpart the Monitor–Merrimac Memorial Bridge–Tunnel, or MMMBT), the Virginia Department of Transportation (VDOT) operated ferries to carry vehicle traffic across the harbor from the Southside to the peninsula. There were two routes: one from Hampton Boulevard near Naval Station Norfolk to downtown Newport News, and a second, less popular route from Willoughby Spit to Fort Monroe in Hampton. Traffic at the time was typically about 2500 vehicles per day. The original two-lane structure opened November 1, 1957, at a cost of $44 million (equivalent to $375 million in 2024) as a toll facility. The tunnel Norfolk to Hampton had a clearance of 13 feet 6 inches (4.11 m). VDOT currently has identified new systems to improve the overheight detection system, by detecting vehicles well in advance of the tunnel to cut down on the over heights approaching the tunnel, This project is estimated to cost the state $900,000.

The HRBT had two 12-foot-wide (3.7 m) lanes each way, on separately built bridge–tunnel structures. The bridge–tunnel was originally signed as State Route 168 (SR 168) and US 60. It later received the I-64 designation when the second span opened in 1976, and, much later, SR 168 was truncated south of the crossing. The centerline of the HRBT tunnels crosses a naturally deep channel ranging from 50 to 60 feet (15 to 18 m) deep and 1.5 miles (2.4 km) wide, with water only 6 to 10 feet (1.8 to 3.0 m) deep between the edge of the deep channel and each shore.

The HRBT includes two artificial islands for the tunnel portals, where Hampton Roads flows into Chesapeake Bay. The south portal island is about 1.2 miles (1.9 km) north of Willoughby Spit. It is connected by an earthen causeway to Rip Raps, a 15 acres (6.1 ha) artificial island 250 feet (76 m) to the northeast, built in 1817 as part of the harbor defenses.

The north portal island is about 0.25 miles (0.40 km) west of Old Point Comfort. However, the northern bridge section of the HRBT runs 0.6 miles (0.97 km) north to the mainland of Hampton.

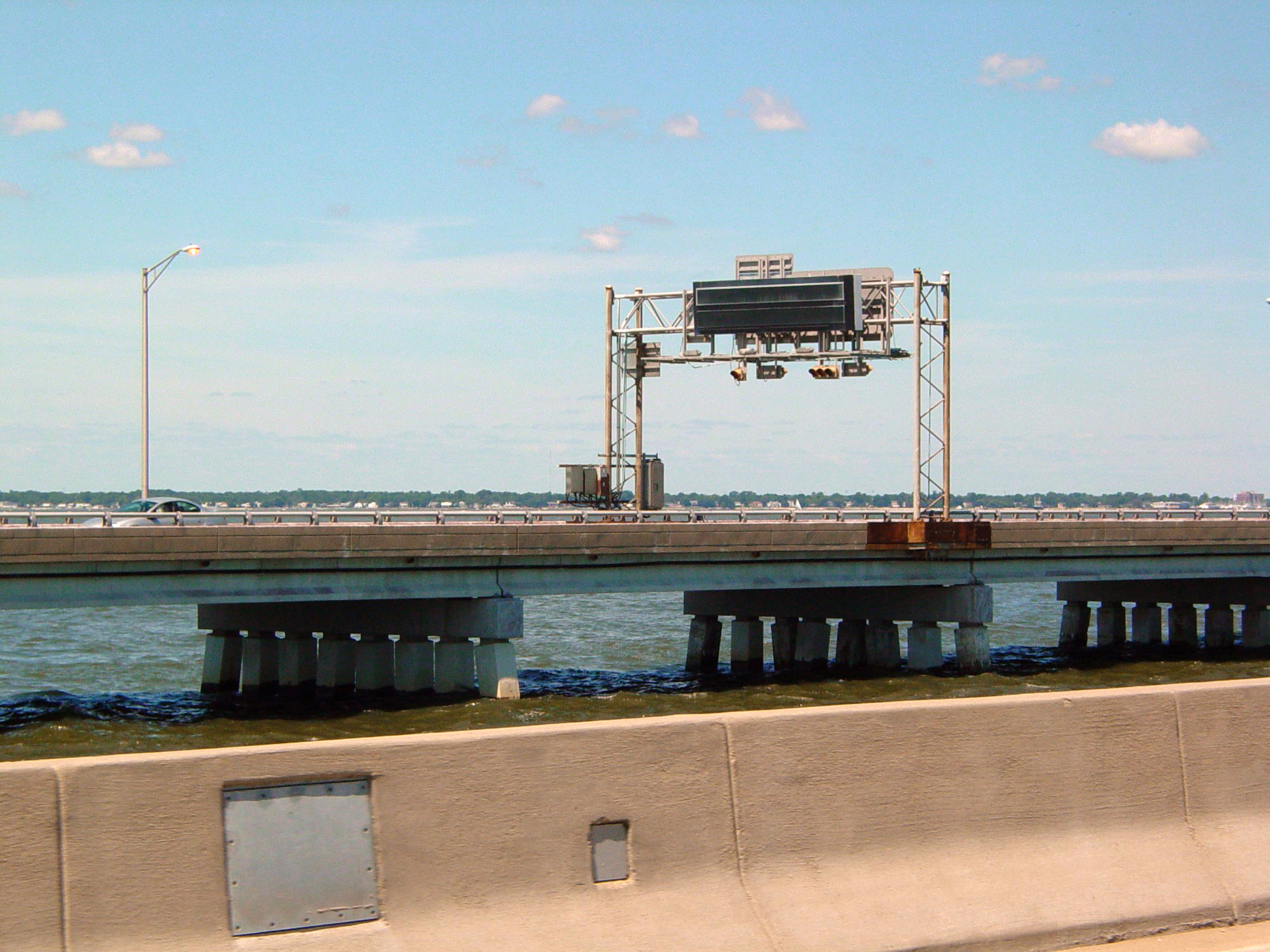
The eastbound span

Given its proximity to the US Navy's Atlantic Fleet home base at Naval Station Norfolk, many nearby shipyards and critical port facilities, the HRBT design incorporates a tunnel instead of a more cost effective drawbridge. A bridge–tunnel, if destroyed in wartime or due to natural disaster, would not block the vital shipping channels.

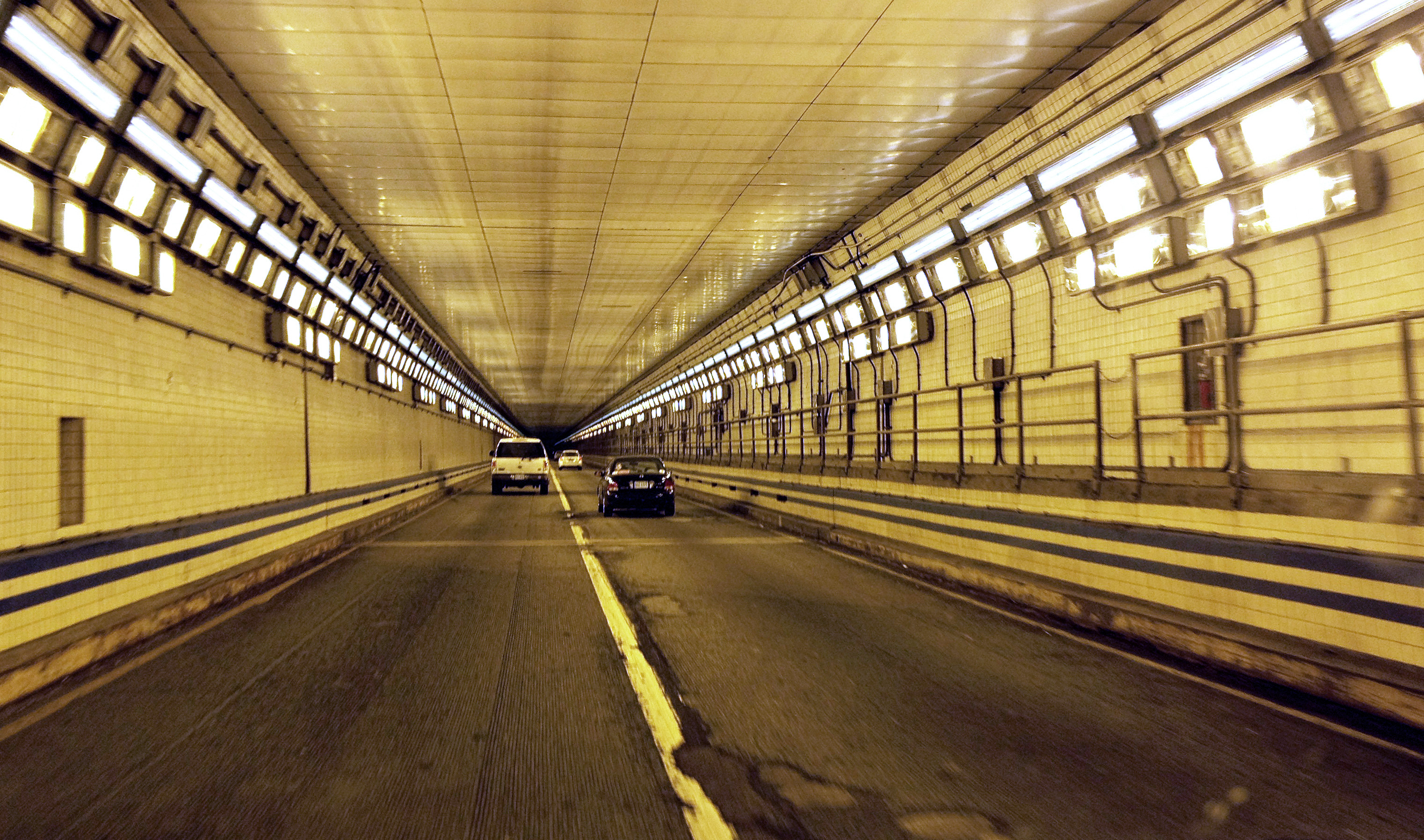
Eastbound in the tunnel

Another four-lane facility, the MMMBT was completed in 1992. The MMMBT provided a second bridge–tunnel crossing of the Hampton Roads harbor, supplementing the HRBT and providing some traffic relief. The MMMBT also forms part of the Hampton Roads Beltway.

=== Widening to four lanes ===
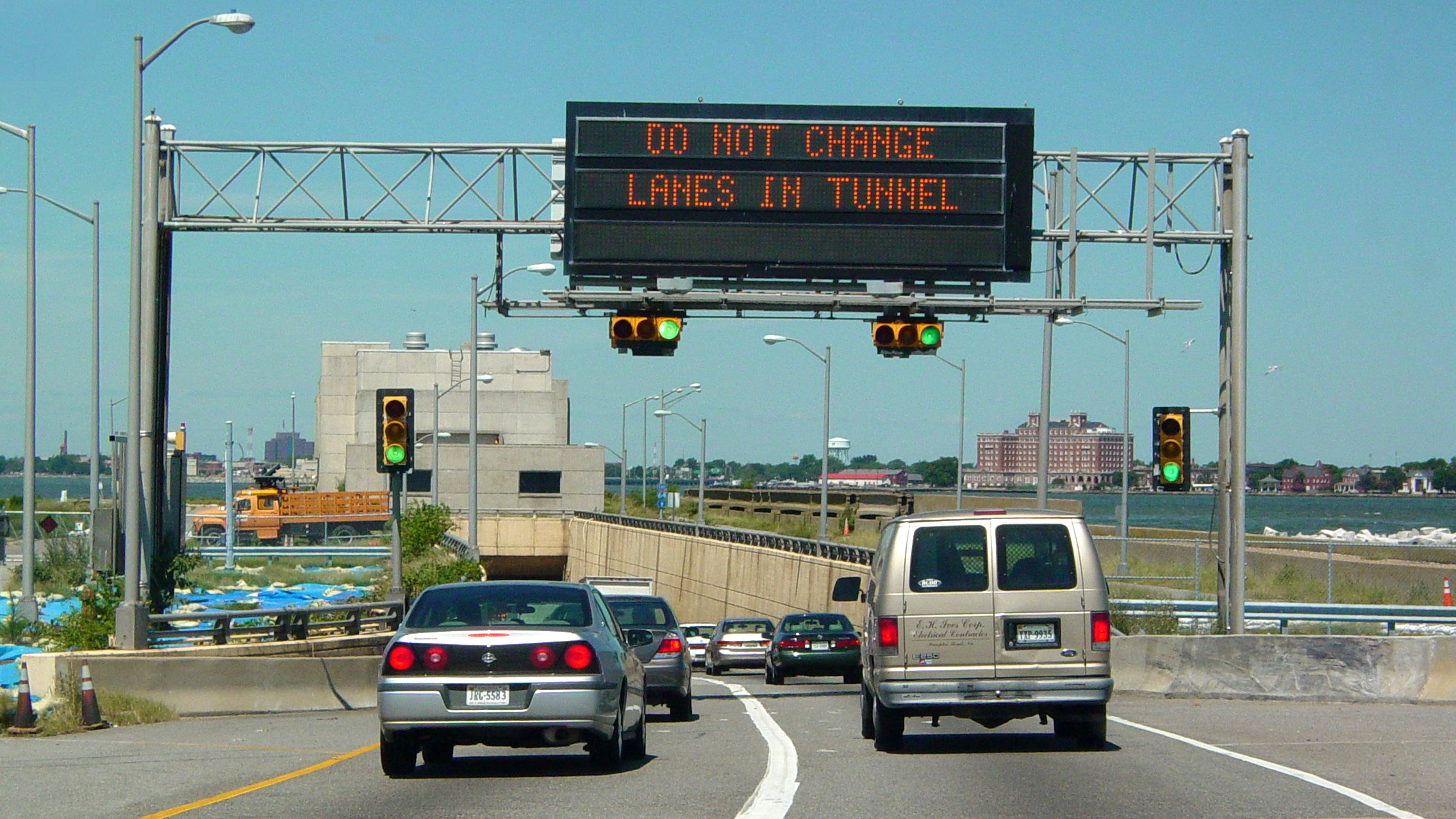
The tunnel entrance

A second bridge-tunnel was necessary with the construction of I-64 in the area. Work on this expansion began in 1972, and it was opened on November 1, 1976, the nineteenth anniversary of the first structures completion. The old bridge-tunnel was subsequently closed for renovations and reopened in 1977. With this, the crossing was a four lane, toll free facility, thus meeting Interstate Highway standards.

=== Over-height vehicles ===
The current westbound tunnel from Norfolk to Hampton is the original tunnel constructed in 1957 and has a lower clearance than the eastbound tube, as it is 13 feet 6 inches (4.11 m) in comparison to 14 feet 6 inches (4.42 m). Because of this, special over-height detectors have been installed near the Willoughby Spit end of the bridge alerting the truck driver to stop at the inspection station for a more precise measurement of the truck's height. If a truck driver ignores this alert or for whatever reason does not stop at the inspection station, VDOT personnel at the tunnel will be alerted and the truck will be alerted and flagged to stop prior to the tunnel entrance, where a fine up to $2,500 may be assessed if the over height occurs during rush hour. This is because any vehicle turnaround at the tunnel requires a full-stoppage of traffic in both directions in order to redirect the affected vehicle from one side of the bridge–tunnel to the other. VDOT currently has identified new systems to improve the overheight detection system, by detecting vehicles well in advance of the tunnel to cut down on the over heights approaching the tunnel, This project is estimated to cost the state $900,000.

=== July 2009 flood ===
In July 2009, the westbound tube partially flooded after a thunderstorm hit the Hampton Roads region. The flooding was caused by a failed water main, which burst and led a chamber below the tunnel roadway to fill with millions of gallons of water. Pumps designed to remove water from the chamber were overwhelmed, and water began to puddle on the roadway, forcing VDOT to close the tunnel for nearly seven hours during midday on July 2, 2009.

This closure forced hundreds of thousands of commuters, tourists, as well as Hampton Roads residents heading westbound for the Fourth of July holiday, to divert and go through the MMMBT or the James River Bridge, the only alternate routes to get to the peninsula. The MMMBT had troubles of its own during the afternoon, as a multiple-vehicle collision shut down the northbound lanes, closing the tunnel and causing a 20-mile (32 km) traffic jam along I-664. The James River Bridge was also closed on July 2 because of downed wires from the storm. The series of events involving all three water crossings led to a "perfect storm" of traffic which led to gridlock throughout all major arteries of Hampton Roads.

The flooding of the Hampton Roads Bridge–Tunnel caused widespread concern about evacuation capabilities of the region during the approach of a hurricane, as the HRBT, MMMBT, and the James River Bridge serve as the primary hurricane evacuation routes for residents of Virginia Beach, Portsmouth, Norfolk, and Chesapeake.

=== July 2016 vehicle crash and fire ===
At 7:30 pm on July 16, 2016, a two-car collision between a Volkswagen Passat and an Acura occurred three-quarters of the way inside the eastbound tunnel, which travels from Hampton to Norfolk. The Acura was struck from the rear by the Passat; both vehicles burst into flames and filled the tunnel with smoke, leaving 35 vehicles stuck inside the tunnel behind the scene. Because neither of the tunnels have escape walkways, 80 drivers and passengers were required to walk out of the tunnel through the smoke, leaving their vehicles behind. While four others were taken to the hospital, 15 people were treated on the scene for smoke inhalation. The fires caused moderate to major damage to the walls of the tunnel, which VDOT repaired through nightly road work at the tunnel.

The crash shut down traffic in both directions for four hours, finally reopening westbound at 11:00 pm, and reopening eastbound at 11:45 pm. The driver of the Passat was cited with following too closely by Virginia State Police.

=== 2020s expansion ===
Hampton Roads Bridge–Tunnel Expansion Project
- Location: Hampton Roads, Virginia
- Proposer: VDOT
- Status: Under construction
- Type: new bridge–tunnel and widening of highway to six lanes
- Cost estimate: $3.3 billion USD
- Completion date: originally November 2025 later revised to 2027
- Stakeholders: VDOT, Cities of Hampton and Norfolk

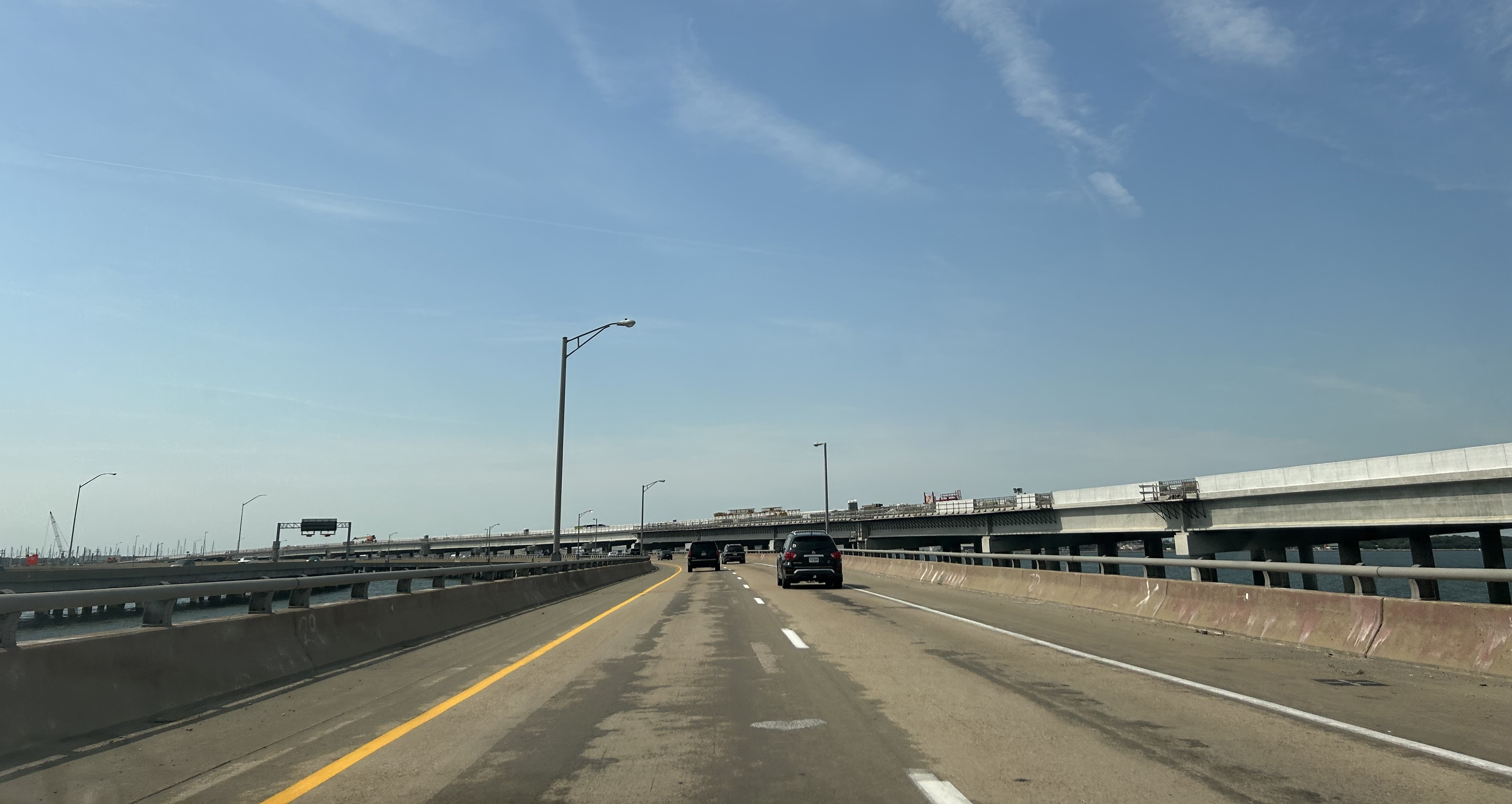
View east along the Hampton Roads Bridge–Tunnel in 2024 with the new bridge under construction to the right

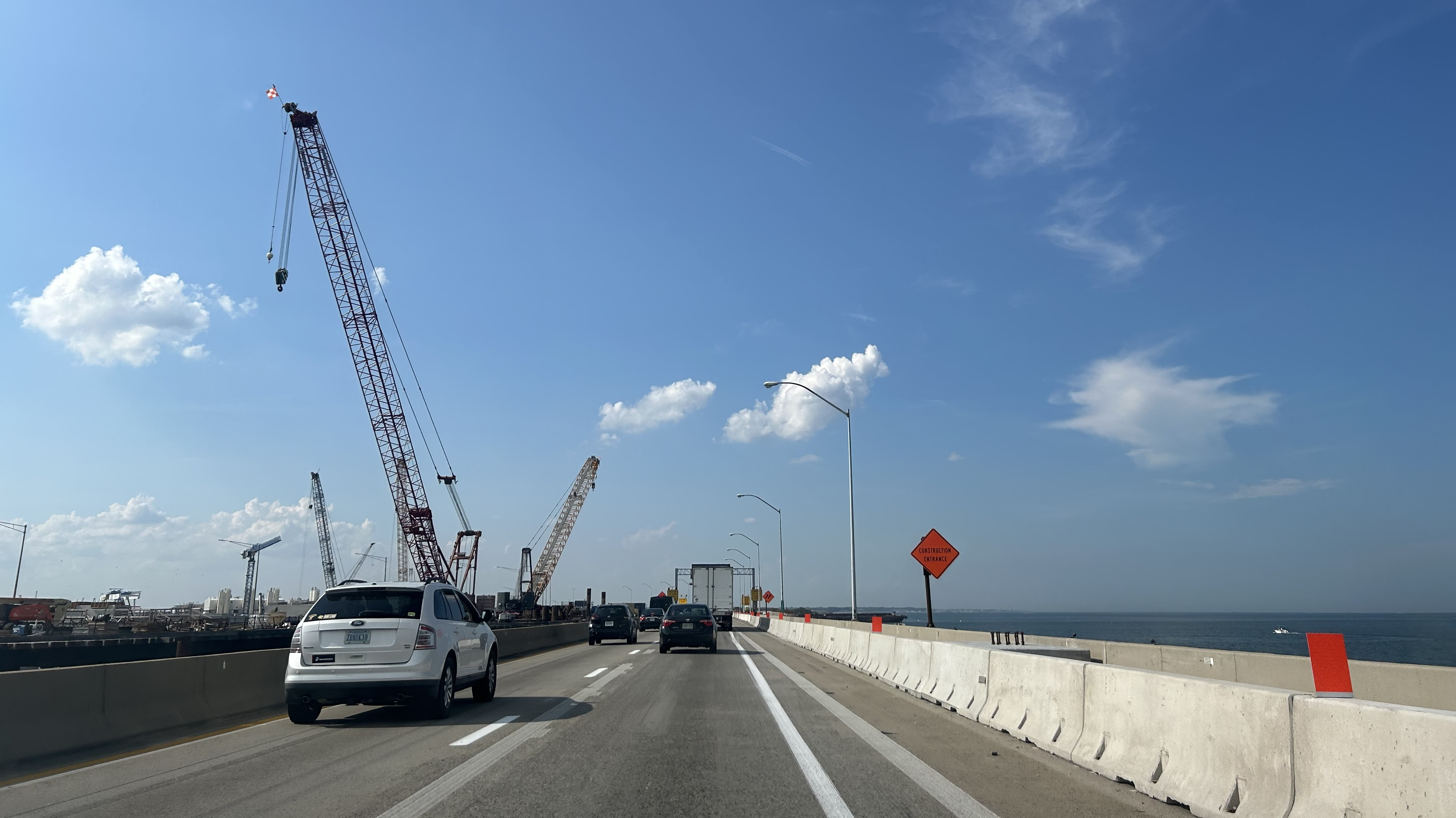
View west along the Hampton Roads Bridge–Tunnel in 2024 with construction underway on adding more tubes

According to Virginia Department of Transportation (VDOT), in 1958, an average of 6,000 vehicles a day used the facility whereas an average of 88,000 vehicles a day were using the crossing in 2008, with volumes exceeding 100,000 during the tourist season, well exceeding the original design capacity of 77,000 vehicles per day, which sparked decades of debate on how to improve traffic flow at the region's most important water crossing. Studies into the growing traffic at the HRBT have roots back to the early 1990s. In 1992, the Virginia General Assembly had requested that VDOT study growing traffic at the HRBT. The conclusion of that study determined that a long-term large-scale solution to the problem would be required to alleviate backups. For the next 14 years, VDOT would undertake numerous studies in 1999, 2008, 2012, and 2016 to help choose a candidate build that was financially and physically feasible to build.

After nearly two decades of studies and planning, the Commonwealth Transportation Board, and the two regional boards responsible for the project (Hampton Roads Transportation Accountability Commission/HRTPO) voted unanimously in 2016 to a $3.3-billion expansion of the current bridge–tunnel and its approaches from four lanes total to four lanes in each direction from the I-664 interchange to the I-564 interchange, with two new, two-lane bridge–tunnels built to carry traffic eastbound (Hampton to Norfolk), while the existing tunnels would be renovated and converted into westbound only. A final environmental impact study was published in May 2017, and the record of decision from the FHWA was granted in June. On October 29, 2020, a groundbreaking ceremony was held in Hampton for the project. It was expected to be completed by November 2025 but this was later changed to February 2027.

On April 17, 2024, a 430-foot-long (130 m) boring machine broke through a concrete-lined pit on North Island, finishing the outline of one of the new westbound tunnels.

== See also ==
- List of bridges
- Lists of tunnels
- List of bridge–tunnels
