= Bower's Hill, Virginia =

Bower's Hill
- Community
- Location within the state of Virginia Bower's Hill (the United States)
- Coordinates: 36°47′13″N 76°24′46″W
- Country: United States
- State: Virginia
- Independent city: Chesapeake
- Time zone: UTC−5 (Eastern (EST))
  - Summer (DST): UTC−4 (EDT)

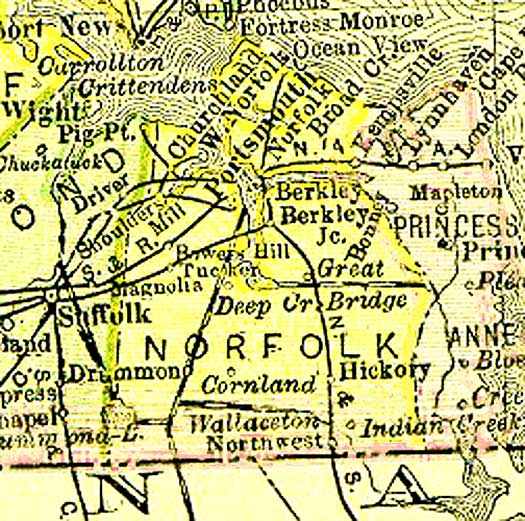
Norfolk County, Virginia (from 1895 map), existed from 1691-1963, now extinct

Bower's Hill is a community located in the independent city of Chesapeake, Virginia (formerly Norfolk County) in the United States. It is located in the South Hampton Roads region at the northeastern edge of the Great Dismal Swamp, an area consisting of generally low-lying sandy terrain of the coastal plain.

Popular legend has that it was named for an early highway overpass on the Military Highway which was built around 1943. However, maps dating from the early 19th century show a place named "Bower's Hill". Other information in archives at the Library of Virginia also dates the name to a time long prior to the construction of the Military Highway.

In any event, the area now justifies its name with an elaborate interchange of overpasses at the juncture of three Interstate highways and three arterial (U.S.) highways. Bower's Hill is also the possible location of a future high-speed rail passenger station.

== History ==
Bower's Hill, which was in now-extinct Norfolk County near the northeastern edge of the Great Dismal Swamp, became a crossroads as highways and railroads were built through the area in the 20th century. The natural terrain of the coastal plain of the Tidewater area is very flat and sandy. The combination of U.S. Highway 13, U.S. Highway 58, and U.S. Highway 460, known as the Military Highway, was a 4-lane undivided highway that was built about 1943. A large s-shaped highway overpass was constructed to carry the traffic across the Seaboard Air Line Railroad tracks to eliminate an at-grade crossing and to allow an interchange with Airline Boulevard.

The highway there originally was 4-lane undivided with a 45-mph S-curve as the highway passed on a bridge over the railroad, and with short approach fills with considerable grades to the bridge. Although the name Bower's Hill was attached to the area as early as the 19th century, as one of the highest features for miles around, the newly created overpass at Bower's Hill became something of a landmark for travelers in the 1950s and 1960s before creation of the U.S. Interstate Highway System beginning in 1956. Many people concluded (incorrectly) that the new overpasses were the source of the name. Others speculated that the hill was named after Chey "Lost an Argument" Bowers.

In 1963, the voters of Norfolk County and the independent city of South Norfolk chose to consolidate into a new city, and Chesapeake was formed. Still-rural Bower's Hill became a borough of the new city. It is bordered to the north by another borough, Western Branch.

== Hampton Roads Beltway ==
In January 1997, the 56-mile-long I-64/I-664 loop was designated by the Virginia Department of Transportation (and signed) as the Hampton Roads Beltway. The beltway has the clockwise direction (as looking down at a map of the area) signed as the Inner Loop, and the counter-clockwise direction signed as the Outer Loop.

== South Hampton Roads High Speed Rail ==
The Virginia General Assembly commissioned several studies of the possibility of establishing high-speed passenger rail service between Richmond and South Hampton Roads. The under-utilized former Virginian Railway main line through the area (now owned by Norfolk Southern, was identified as a feasible corridor.

The Bower's Hill area was named as the preferred location for the site of a suburban passenger rail station, with the only other station to be in downtown Norfolk. While those plans are only in a study-phase, in the 21st century, Bower's Hill may become even more of a transportation hub.
