= Virginia State Route 173 =

State highway in Virginia, United States

State Route 173

Route information
- Maintained by VDOT
- Length: 10.84 mi (17.45 km)
- Existed: 1933–present

Major junctions
- West end: Moyer Road in Newport News
- US 60 in Newport News; SR 143 in Newport News; US 17 in Grafton
- East end: SR 629 in Dandy

Location
- Country: United States
- State: Virginia
- Counties: City of Newport News, York

Highway system
- Virginia Routes; Interstate; US; Primary; Secondary; Byways; History; HOT lanes
← SR 172	→ SR 174

State Route 173 (SR 173) is a primary state highway in the U.S. state of Virginia. The state highway runs 10.84 miles (17.45 km) from Moyer Road in Newport News east to SR 629 in Dandy. SR 173 connects the Denbigh area of Newport News with Grafton, Seaford, and Dandy in eastern York County.

== Route description ==
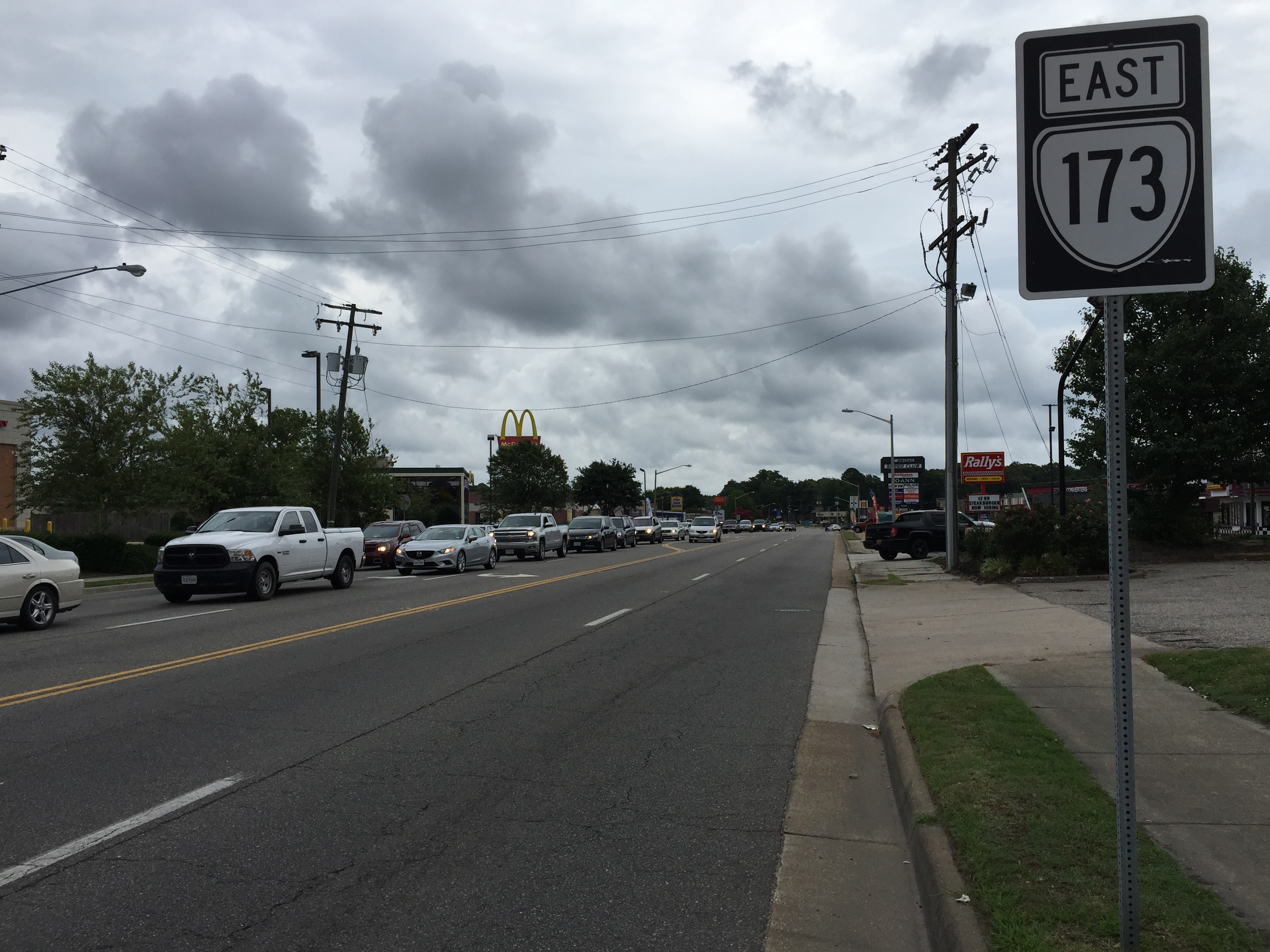
View east along SR 173 at US 60 in Newport News

SR 173 begins at the intersection of Denbigh Boulevard and Moyer Road on the western edge of the Denbigh section of the independent city of Newport News. Denbigh Boulevard continues west to the Warwick River, where the highway ends at the Denbigh Park Boat Ramp within Denbigh Park. The state highway starts east through a residential area as a two-lane undivided road but expands to four lanes at Catalina Drive. At its intersection with U.S. Route 60 (US 60, Warwick Boulevard), SR 173 gains a center left-turn lane. The state highway crosses over CSX's Peninsula Subdivision and Interstate 64 with no access. SR 173 veers northeast and becomes a divided highway at its junction with SR 143 (Jefferson Avenue) west of Newport News/Williamsburg International Airport in the Oriana section of Newport News. At the boundary between the city of Newport News and York County, SR 173 reduces to a two-lane undivided road and its surroundings change from a suburban area to forest. After crossing the Poquoson River, the state highway intersects US 17 (George Washington Memorial Highway) in Grafton. SR 173 continues northeast as Goodwin Neck Road, which passes to the west of Seaford then curves east onto Goodwin Neck between Back Creek to the south and the Yorktown Refinery to the north. The state highway reaches its eastern terminus at SR 629 (Dandy Loop Road) in the community of Dandy on Goodwin Neck.

== Major intersections ==
County	Location	mi	km	Destinations	Notes
City of Newport News		0.00	0.00	Moyer Road / Denbigh Boulevard	Western terminus
City of Newport News		1.82	2.93	US 60 (Warwick Boulevard)	
City of Newport News		2.96	4.76	SR 143 (Jefferson Avenue) to I-64	
York	Grafton	6.16	9.91	US 17 (George Washington Memorial Highway) – Yorktown, Newport News	
York				SR 622 (Seaford Road) – Seaford	
York	Dandy	10.84	17.45	SR 629 (Dandy Loop Road)	Eastern terminus
1.000 mi = 1.609 km; 1.000 km = 0.621 mi

< SR 516	District 5 State Routes; 1928–1933	SR 518 >
< SR 527	District 5 State Routes; 1928–1933	SR 529 >
