= Anderson's Corner, Virginia =

Anderson's Corner, Virginia is located in James City County near the unincorporated community of Toano. Located at the intersection of U.S. Route 60 and State Route 30, Anderson's Corner was the western terminus of State Route 168 a new four-laned highway also known as the Merrimack Trail which was established in the pre-World War II era to supplement the heavily traveled Route 60 through the Williamsburg where the Colonial Williamsburg Restoration funded by Abby and John D. Rockefeller Jr. had added to traffic, as well as the growing Virginia Peninsula area, connecting via harbor ferry with similarly designated roads in South Hampton Roads.

On the south side of the harbor, Route 168 connected with North Carolina's own Route 168 leading to the Outer Banks resorts. The newly completed two-laned Hampton Roads Bridge-Tunnel was designated Route 168 when it opened in 1957. The new Tidewater Drive received the Route 168 designation after World War II.

As portions of Interstate 64 were completed in the late 1950s and 1960s, they occasionally bore a Route 168 designation for a period of time until substantial through service using the I-64 signage became more practical for use. The route 168 designation was eventually truncated south of the bridge-tunnel, and portions of the former roadway became reused as frontage routes, as well as parts of state routes 30 and State Route 143).

Anderson's Corner became far less busy with through tourist and other traffic after the interstate opened, not unlike many older business areas in the United States during that era of the mid-20th century.
