= Virginia State Route 105 =

State highway in southeastern Virginia, US

State Route 105
- Fort Eustis Boulevard

Route information
- Maintained by VDOT
- Length: 4.90 mi (7.89 km)
- Existed: 1950s–present

Major junctions
- West end: Fort Eustis in Newport News
- US 60 in Newport News; I-64 in Newport News; SR 143 in Newport News
- East end: US 17 / SR 1050 near Grafton

Location
- Country: United States
- State: Virginia
- Counties: City of Newport News, York

Highway system
- Virginia Routes; Interstate; US; Primary; Secondary; Byways; History; HOT lanes
← SR 103	→ SR 106

State Route 105 (SR 105) is a primary state highway in the U.S. state of Virginia. Known as Fort Eustis Boulevard, the state highway runs 4.90 miles (7.89 km) from Fort Eustis in Newport News east to U.S. Route 17 (US 17) near Grafton in York County. SR 105 is a cross-peninsula highway that connects Fort Eustis, a U.S. Army installation, with US 60 and Interstate 64 (I-64), and US 17 near Yorktown.

== Route description ==
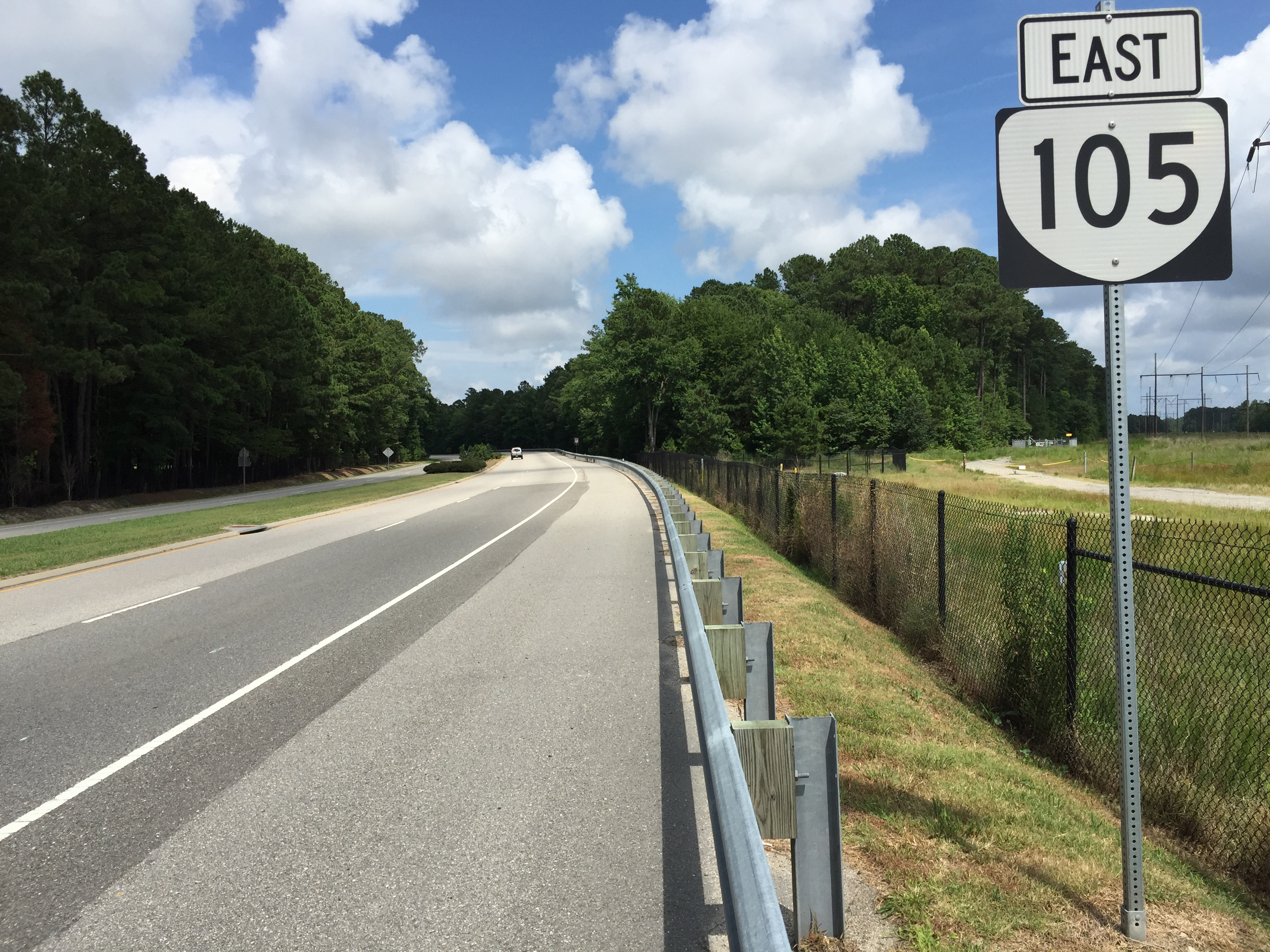
View east along SR 105 entering York County

SR 105 begins at the entrance to Fort Eustis, which is the home of U.S. Army Transportation Corps and the U.S. Army Transportation Museum. The highway continues southwest onto the military base as Washington Boulevard. Just west of SR 105's western terminus, the westbound direction has a grade crossing with the Fort Eustis Military Railroad.

SR 105 heads east as a four-lane divided highway that has a partial cloverleaf interchange with US 60 (Warwick Boulevard); the interchange includes a flyover ramp from westbound US 60 to westbound SR 105. The state highway crosses Lee Hall Reservoir and CSX's Peninsula Subdivision railroad line. East of the railroad, SR 105 has a cloverleaf interchange with I-64 and an intersection with SR 143 (Jefferson Avenue). SR 143 is used as an intermediary for the ramps from westbound I-64 to eastbound SR 105 and from westbound SR 105 to westbound I-64.

SR 105 continues east along the southern edge of Newport News Park before entering York County, where the highway passes through a forested area with scattered residential subdivisions. SR 105 reaches its eastern terminus at US 17 (George Washington Memorial Highway) between Yorktown to the north and Grafton to the south. Fort Eustis Boulevard continues east as SR 1050 to the named highway's present eastern terminus at SR 634 (Old York Hampton Highway).

In late 2009 the Virginia Department of Transportation began a widening project of SR 105 between Jefferson Avenue in Newport News and US 17 in York County. The road was widened from two to four lanes with a raised median. Construction was completed in Spring 2012.

== Major intersections ==
County	Location	mi	km	Destinations	Notes
City of Newport News		0.00	0.00	Fort Eustis	Western terminus
City of Newport News		0.04	0.064	US 60	interchange
City of Newport News		1.05	1.69	I-64 – Williamsburg, Richmond, Hampton, Norfolk	I-64 exit 250
City of Newport News		1.28	2.06	SR 143 (Jefferson Avenue) – Hampton	
York	Harris Grove	4.90	7.89	US 17 (George Washington Memorial Highway) / SR 1050 (Fort Eustis Boulevard) – Yorktown, Newport News, Coast Guard Training Center, Colonial Parkway	Eastern terminus
1.000 mi = 1.609 km; 1.000 km = 0.621 mi
