= Rosney, Virginia =

Unincorporated community in Virginia, United States

Coordinates: 37°30′34″N 78°25′31″W

Rosney is an unincorporated community in Buckingham County, in the U.S. state of Virginia.

== Geography ==
Rosney is located in eastern Buckingham County at 37°30'34"N 78°25'31"W (37.50944444, -78.42527778). U.S. Route 60 is the community's major thoroughfare.
