= Manchester Bridge =

Manchester Bridge may refer to one of the following bridges:

- Manchester Bridge (Pittsburgh), a bridge that spanned the Allegheny River in Pittsburgh, Pennsylvania, United States
- Manchester Bridge (Virginia), carries U.S. Route 60 across the James River, in Richmond, Virginia, United States
