= Virginia State Route 351 =

State highway in Virginia, United States

State Route 351

Route information
- Maintained by VDOT
- Length: 8.81 mi (14.18 km)
- Existed: mid-1940s–present

Major junctions
- West end: US 60 in Newport News
- SR 143 in Newport News; SR 415 in Hampton; SR 134 in Hampton; US 258 in Hampton; SR 169 in Hampton
- East end: Second Street in Hampton

Location
- Country: United States
- State: Virginia
- Counties: City of Newport News, City of Hampton

Highway system
- Virginia Routes; Interstate; US; Primary; Secondary; Byways; History; HOT lanes
← SR 350	→ SR 352

State Route 351 (SR 351) is a primary state highway in the U.S. state of Virginia. Known for most of its length as Pembroke Avenue, the state highway runs 8.81 miles (14.18 km) from U.S. Route 60 (US 60) in Newport News east to Second Street in Hampton.

== Route description ==
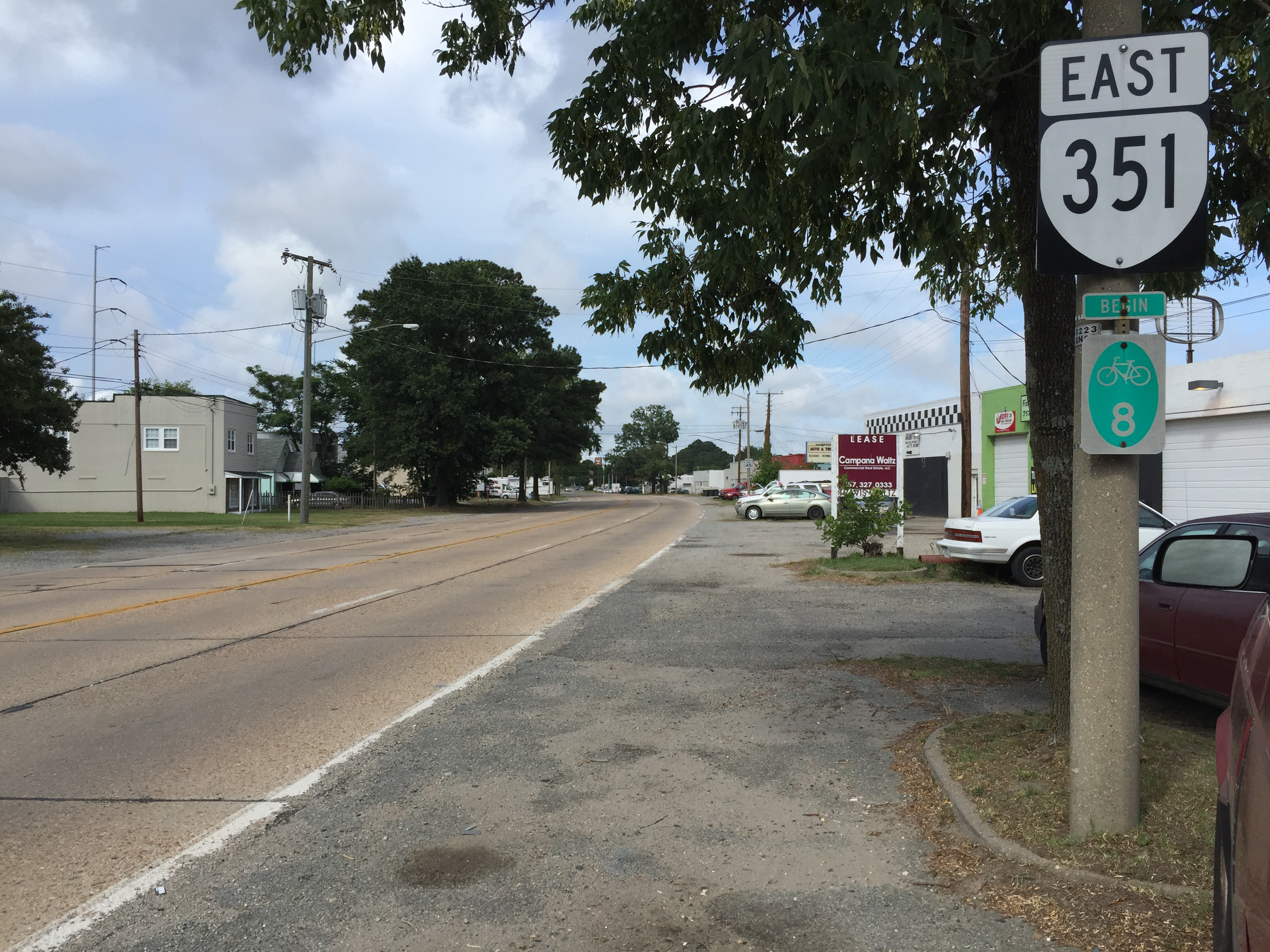
View east along SR 351 just after entering Hampton from Newport News

SR 351 begins at eastbound US 60 (Huntington Avenue) within parking lots serving the waterfront industrial area to the west and near The Apprentice School in the East End of the independent city of Newport News. Access to westbound US 60 (Warwick Boulevard) is by following Huntington Avenue south one block and using 38th Street. SR 351 heads east as two-lane undivided 39th Street, which follows a viaduct over Warwick Boulevard; CSX's Peninsula Subdivision near its eastern end and at its junction with its Hampton Branch; and SR 143 (Jefferson Avenue). Access to SR 143 is provided through ramps to 40th Street. East of the ramps, SR 351 expands to a four-lane undivided street and has a long, oblique underpass of Interstate 664 (I-664) (Hampton Roads Beltway). SR 351 heads east between I-664 immediately to the north and the Hampton Branch rail line one block to the south. Access to the Interstate is provided through Roanoke Avenue and Chestnut Avenue, which each have half-diamond interchanges with the freeway.

SR 351 enters the city of Hampton just east of where I-664 veers away from the immediate vicinity of the state highway and the Hampton Branch crosses to the north side of the highway at an oblique grade crossing. The state highway continues northeast as Pembroke Avenue, which closely parallels the railroad beginning at the highway's intersection with Aberdeen Road, which provides further access to I-664. SR 351 passes War Memorial Stadium, the home of the Peninsula Pilots baseball team, before intersecting Powhatan Parkway, which provides SR 351's final access to I-664. SR 351 intersects SR 415 (Queen Street) and Settlers Landing Road, which heads east toward downtown Hampton. East of Lasalle Avenue, the state highway curves east away from the railroad.

SR 351 intersects SR 134 (Armistead Avenue) and passes along the northern edge of downtown Hampton, passing the municipal center and becoming a two-lane divided highway. The state highway becomes undivided just before it passes under I-64 (Hampton Roads Beltway) and crosses the Hampton River. SR 351 follows a three-lane road with a center left-turn lane to its junction with US 258 (Mercury Boulevard), then veers northeast as a four-lane undivided highway toward the Buckroe Beach neighborhood of Hampton. The state highway reduces to two lanes at its western intersection with SR 169 (Old Buckroe Road). The two highways run concurrently east to Mallory Street, onto which SR 169 turns south toward the Phoebus neighborhood of Hampton. SR 351 reaches its eastern terminus one block to the east at Second Street on the edge of Buckroe Park two blocks west of the Chesapeake Bay.

== History ==
King Street north from downtown Hampton, continuing northeast on current State Route 169, was added to the state highway system in 1928 as State Route 513. The Shell Road alignment between Newport News and Hampton was added in 1931 and 1932 as State Route 532. Also in 1932, the road from Hampton part of the way towards Buckroe Beach was added.

In the 1933 renumbering, a Newport News-Hampton-Buckroe Beach route, along with Jefferson Avenue in Newport News towards Williamsburg, became State Route 168. From Newport News east, this used what had been SR 532 to the intersection of Shell Road and LaSalle Avenue. There it followed State Route 167 (former State Route 511) along Shell Road, Newport News Avenue, and Back River Road to Queen Street, State Route 27/167 (former State Route 514) along Back River Road, and SR 167 (former State Route 533) along Rip Rap Road to King Street (former SR 513). SR 167 continued northeast on former SR 513, while SR 168 turned south on SR 513 into Hampton, where it headed east on Pmbroke Avenue as added in 1932. The rest of the route to Buckroe Beach (via Old Buckroe Road and Buckroe Avenue to Third Street, ending at State Route 169), was added in 1936.

A new alignment of SR 168 between 39th Street and Huntington Avenue in Newport News and Pembroke Avenue and King Street in Hampton was built in the early 1940s, and added to the state highway system in 1944; the old route (then on Shell Road) became State Route 143. By 1947, SR 168 was rerouted in Hampton to continue south on Jefferson Avenue, and State Route 351, which had been used for a route in Norfolk that SR 168 absorbed, was assigned to the old alignment to Buckroe Beach, as well as the continuation west to Warwick Boulevard (U.S. Route 60). In 1976, when US 60 eastbound was moved to Huntington Avenue, SR 351 was extended west a block to meet it.

== Major intersections ==
County	Location	mi	km	Destinations	Notes
City of Newport News		0.00	0.00	US 60 east (Huntington Avenue) to US 60 west	Western terminus; access to US 60 west is via 38th Street
City of Newport News		0.64	1.03	To SR 143	interchange
City of Hampton		4.56	7.34	SR 415 west (West Queen Street) / Settlers Landing Road	Eastern terminus of SR 415
City of Hampton				LaSalle Avenue	former SR 167
City of Hampton		5.43	8.74	SR 134 (North Armistead Avenue)	
City of Hampton		6.84	11.01	US 258 (East Mercury Boulevard)	
City of Hampton		8.14	13.10	SR 169 north (Old Buckroe Road) – Grandview	West end of concurrency with SR 169
City of Hampton		8.74	14.07	SR 169 south (Mallory Street)	East end of concurrency with SR 169
City of Hampton		8.81	14.18	Second Street	Eastern terminus
1.000 mi = 1.609 km; 1.000 km = 0.621 mi: Concurrency terminus
