= Virginia State Route 312 =

State highway in Newport News, Virginia, US

State Route 312
- J. Clyde Morris Boulevard; Avenue of the Arts

Route information
- Maintained by VDOT
- Length: 1.11 mi (1.79 km)
- Existed: 1950s–present

Major junctions
- West end: US 60 in Newport News
- East end: US 17 / SR 143 in Newport News

Location
- Country: United States
- State: Virginia
- Counties: City of Newport News

Highway system
- Virginia Routes; Interstate; US; Primary; Secondary; Byways; History; HOT lanes
← SR 311	→ SR 313

State Route 312 (SR 312) is a primary state highway in the U.S. state of Virginia. Known as J. Clyde Morris Boulevard and the Avenue of the Arts, the state highway runs 1.11 miles (1.79 km) from U.S. Route 60 (US 60) east to US 17 and SR 143 within the independent city of Newport News. SR 312 serves as a connector between US 60 and US 17 and SR 143 in the central part of Newport News. In conjunction with US 17, the state highway connects Interstate 64 (I-64) with several cultural institutions, including Christopher Newport University.

== Route description ==
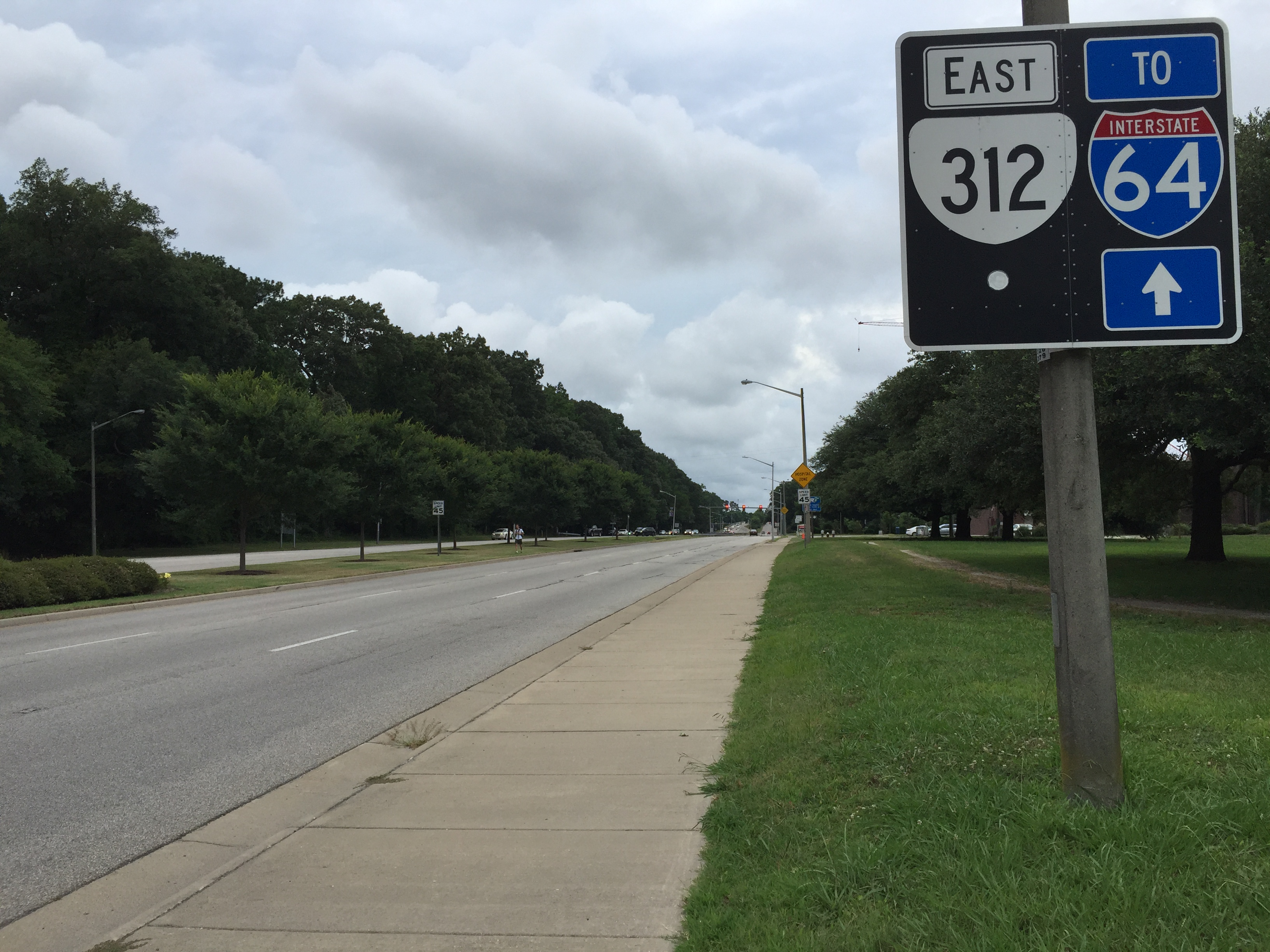
View east at the west end of SR 312 at US 60 in Newport News

SR 312 begins at a four-way intersection with US 60 (Warwick Boulevard). The west leg of the intersection is Avenue of the Arts, which leads to Christopher Newport University, the Ferguson Center for the Arts, the Peninsula Fine Arts Center, the Mariners' Museum, and the Mariners' Lake. SR 312 heads northeast as a four-lane divided highway that crosses over CSX's Peninsula Subdivision. The state highway passes the Virginia Living Museum before reaching its eastern terminus at US 17 and SR 143, which head southeast concurrently on Jefferson Avenue toward downtown Newport News and Hampton. SR 143 also heads northwest on Jefferson Avenue toward Williamsburg and US 17 follows the continuation of J. Clyde Morris Boulevard toward I-64 and Yorktown.

== Major intersections ==
The entire route is in Newport News.

mi	km	Destinations	Notes
0.00	0.00	US 60 (Warwick Boulevard) / Avenue of the Arts – Mariners Museum, Peninsula Fine Arts Center	
1.11	1.79	US 17 / SR 143 (J. Clyde Morris Boulevard / Jefferson Avenue) to I-64 – Newport News/Williamsburg International Airport	
1.000 mi = 1.609 km; 1.000 km = 0.621 mi
