= Merrimack Trail =

Merrimack Trail is the local name for State Route 143 as it passes through portions of York County and James City County and the independent city of Williamsburg in the Virginia Peninsula subregion of Hampton Roads in Virginia.

== History ==
With the Restoration and additional tourism traffic generated by Colonial Williamsburg beginning in the late 1920s, Merrimack Trail was built in the early 1930s to supplement U.S. Route 60 as part the State Route 168 project which extended all the way east to North Carolina.

The Merrimack Trail portion of VA-168 extended on the Virginia Peninsula from Anderson Corner near Toano to a crossing of Hampton Roads to South Hampton Roads by ferry, prior to the opening of the Hampton Roads Bridge-Tunnel on November 1, 1957. The ferry, which connected to Norfolk at the end of 99th Street at Pine Beach, charged a toll of automobile and driver, $1 and $1.25 for each additional passenger.

The name originated because the road lead to a ferry landing in Newport News was located near the historic location of the Battle of Hampton Roads between the ironclad warships in March 1862 during the American Civil War. The Confederate ironclad C.S.S. Virginia had been built from the hull of the U.S.S. Merrimack, partially burned by Union troops evacuating the Norfolk Naval Shipyard the previous year.

In the 1960s, as the new Interstate 64 was completed, major portions of VA-168 west of Old Point Comfort were redesignated as State Route 143.
