= Virginia State Route 169 =

State highway in Virginia, United States

State Route 169

Route information
- Maintained by VDOT
- Length: 7.41 mi (11.93 km)
- Existed: 1933–present

Major junctions
- West end: I-64 / US 60 in Hampton
- US 258 in Hampton
- North end: US 258 in Hampton

Location
- Country: United States
- State: Virginia
- Counties: City of Hampton

Highway system
- Virginia Routes; Interstate; US; Primary; Secondary; Byways; History; HOT lanes
← SR 168	→ SR 170

State Route 169 (SR 169) is a primary state highway in the U.S. state of Virginia. The state highway runs 7.41 miles (11.93 km) from Interstate 64 (I-64) and U.S. Route 60 (US 60) to US 258 within the independent city of Hampton. SR 169 is a C-shaped route that connects the Hampton neighborhoods of Phoebus, Buckroe Beach, and Fox Hill.

== Route description ==
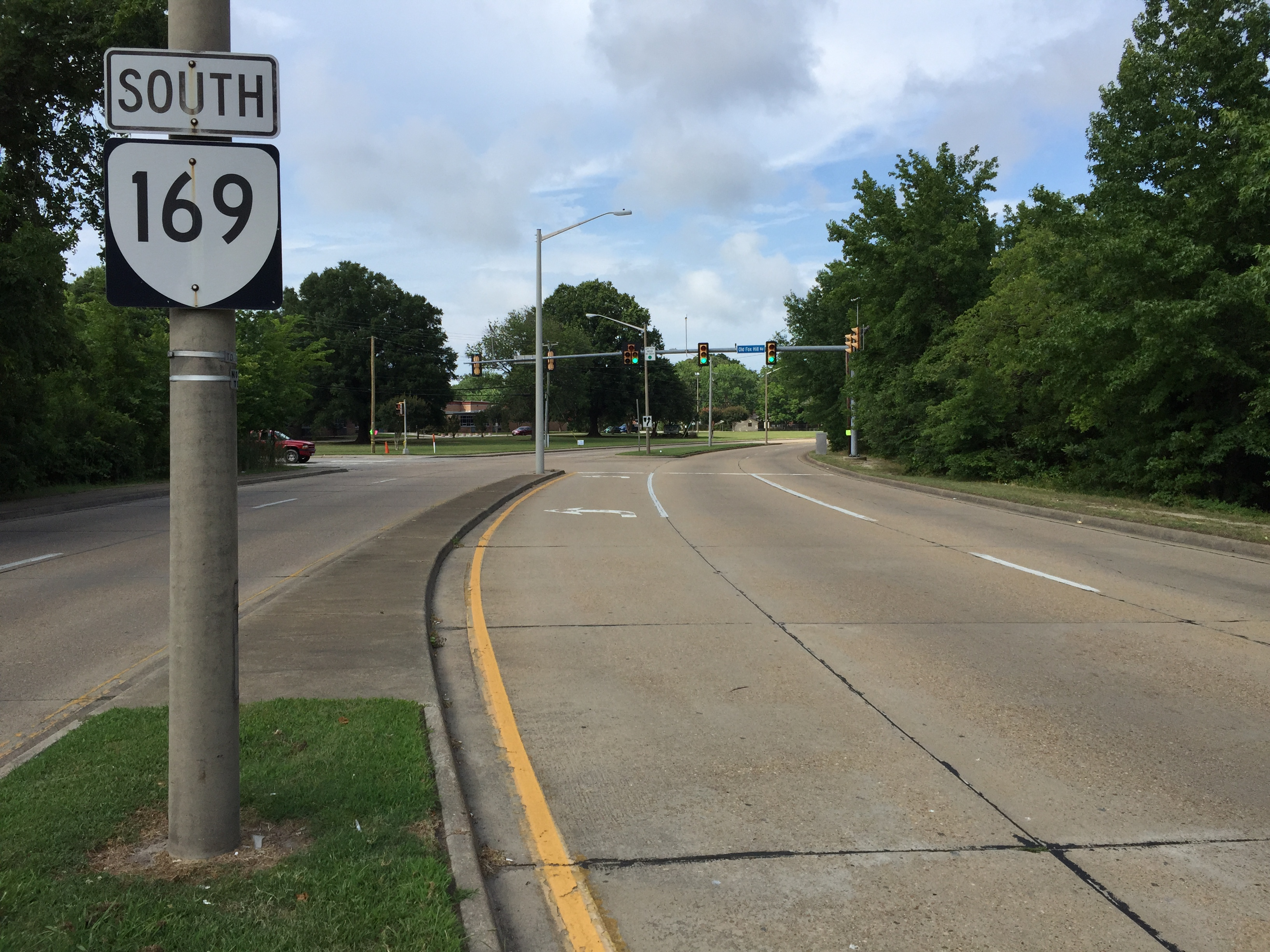
View south near the north end of SR 169 at US 258 in Hampton

SR 169 begins at the highway's partial cloverleaf interchange with I-64 and US 60 (Hampton Roads Beltway) just north of the Hampton Roads Bridge–Tunnel. The road continues west onto the campus of the Hampton VA Hospital. SR 169 heads east as two-lane undivided Mallory Street into the Phoebus neighborhood of Hampton, where the highway intersects SR 143 (Mellen Street) and US 258 (Mercury Boulevard). Both highways provide access to Fort Monroe. From US 258, SR 169 heads northeast as a four-lane divided highway to the Buckroe Beach neighborhood. Next to Buckroe Park, the state highway intersects SR 351 (Pembroke Avenue). SR 169 turns west and runs concurrently with SR 351 on two-lane undivided Pembroke Avenue before turning northeast onto Old Buckroe Road. The state highway follows the two-lane road to the southern edge of the Fox Hill neighborhood, where the highway turns west onto Fox Hill Road. SR 169 follows the four-lane undivided highway west and then southwest through several neighborhoods to its northern terminus at US 258 (Mercury Boulevard).

== History ==
The road from State Route 9 (now State Route 143), at the intersection of County and Mallory Streets in Phoebus, northeast along Mallory Street (then the Mill Creek Road) to the intersection of Point Comfort Avenue and Resort Boulevard at Buckroe Beach, was added to the state highway system in 1923 as State Route 394 (a spur of State Route 39, renumbered from SR 9). In the 1928 renumbering, SR 394 became State Route 512, and in the 1933 renumbering it became State Route 169.

In 1934, a loop at Buckroe Beach was added to SR 169, running north on Resort Boulevard, west on Buckroe Avenue, and south on Mallory Street. In addition to this loop, SR 169 was extended north and west from Buckroe Beach in 1966, running west on State Route 351 (Pembroke Avenue) and then replacing part of what had been State Route 167 on Old Buckroe Road and Fox Hill Road, ending at State Route 278 (King Street) just north of U.S. Route 258 (Mercury Boulevard). The loop was removed in 1975, leaving only the Mallory Street-Pembroke Alignment at Buckroe Beach. Fox Hill Road has since been realigned to meet US 258 east of SR 278.

At the Phoebus end, SR 169 was extended southwest along Mallory Street to Mellen Street, a single block extra, in 1979, due to a realignment of State Route 143. SR 169 has never officially extended further along Mallory Street to Interstate 64 near the Veterans Administration, despite Hampton requesting said extension in 1948 and this extension being signed on I-64.

In September 2019, the section of SR 169 from SR 351 to US 258 in Phoebus was given to the city of Hampton, creating a gap in the route. So far, there has been no announcement of renumbering one of the two remaining sections of the road.

== Major intersections ==
The entire route is in Hampton.

mi	km	Destinations	Notes
0.00	0.00	I-64 (US 60) – Norfolk, Virginia Beach, Williamsburg, Richmond	Exit 268 (I-64); western terminus
0.36	0.58	SR 143 (Mellen Street) – Fort Monroe	
0.58	0.93	US 258 / SR 143 Truck (East Mercury Boulevard)	
2.53	4.07	SR 351 east (East Pembroke Avenue)	south end of SR 351 overlap
3.13	5.04	SR 351 west (East Pembroke Avenue)	north end of SR 351 overlap
		Silver Isles Boulevard – Grandview	former SR 169 east
7.41	11.93	US 258 (East Mercury Boulevard) to I-64	Northern terminus
1.000 mi = 1.609 km; 1.000 km = 0.621 mi: Concurrency terminus

< SR 393	Spurs of SR 39; 1923–1928	SR 395 >
< SR 511	District 5 State Routes; 1928–1933	SR 513 >
