= Virginia State Route 415 =

State highway in Hampton, Virginia, US

State Route 415

Route information
- Maintained by VDOT
- Length: 2.59 mi (4.17 km)
- Existed: early 1980s–present

Major junctions
- West end: US 258 in Hampton
- East end: SR 351 in Hampton

Location
- Country: United States
- State: Virginia
- Counties: City of Hampton

Highway system
- Virginia Routes; Interstate; US; Primary; Secondary; Byways; History; HOT lanes
← SR 413	→ SR 419

State Route 415 (SR 415) is a primary state highway in the U.S. state of Virginia. The state highway runs 2.59 miles (4.17 km) from U.S. Route 258 (US 258) east to SR 351 within the independent city of Hampton.

== Route description ==
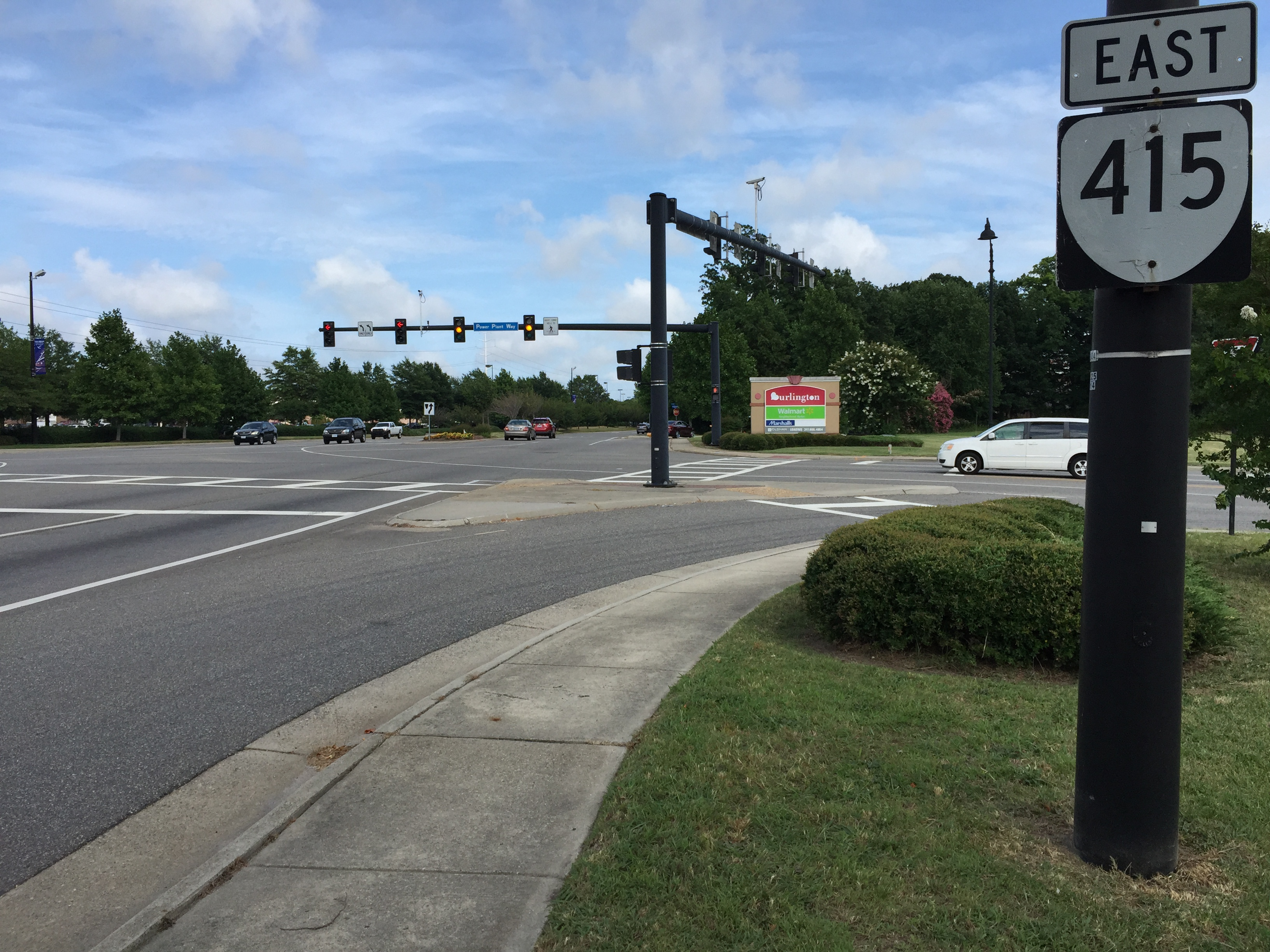
View east near the west end of SR 415 at US 258 in Hampton

SR 415 begins at an intersection with US 258 (Mercury Boulevard) west of Interstate 64 (I-64) near Hampton Coliseum. The north leg of the intersection is Todds Lane, which leads north to and becomes part of SR 152. SR 415 heads southeast on Power Plant Parkway, a four-lane divided highway that passes a shopping center and a bypassed section of Queen Street that serves the Aberdeen Gardens neighborhood of Hampton. Before reconnecting with Queen Street, the highway intersects Pine Chapel Road, which leads to Bluebird Gap Farm and crosses I-64 to the Coliseum complex. South of the intersection with Queen Street, SR 415 temporarily becomes an undivided highway as it crosses Newmarket Creek. South of the creek, the state highway turns east onto Queen Street. Power Plant Parkway continues south as an unnumbered boulevard through an interchange with I-664 (Hampton Roads Beltway); the west leg of the intersection is Briarfield Road. SR 415 heads east as a four-lane undivided highway, with an intermittent center left-turn lane, past Hampton High School and under I-664. The state highway has a grade crossing of the Hampton Branch of CSX's Peninsula Subdivision immediately before its eastern terminus at SR 351 (Pembroke Road). The roadway continues east as Settlers Landing Road toward downtown Hampton.

== Major intersections ==
The entire route is in Hampton.

mi	km	Destinations	Notes
0.00	0.00	US 258 (Mercury Boulevard) to Todds Lane west / I-64	Western terminus
2.59	4.17	SR 351 (Pembroke Avenue) / Settlers Landing Road east	Eastern terminus
1.000 mi = 1.609 km; 1.000 km = 0.621 mi
