= Great Bridge Bridge =

Drawbridge in Chesapeake, Virginia, US

Coordinates: 36°43′15.1″N 76°14′23.8″W

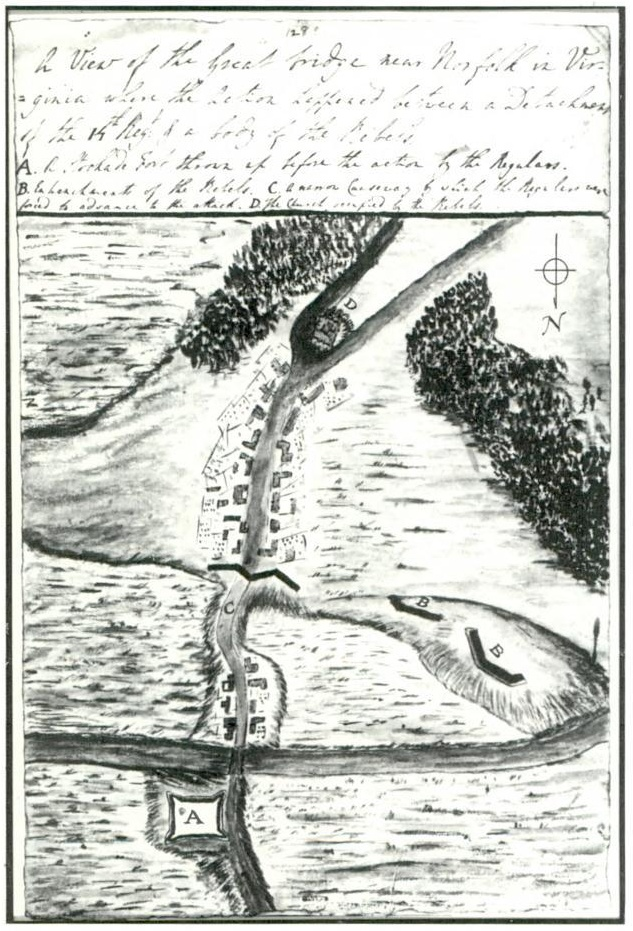
The Battle of Great Bridge was fought at this crossing on December 9, 1775.

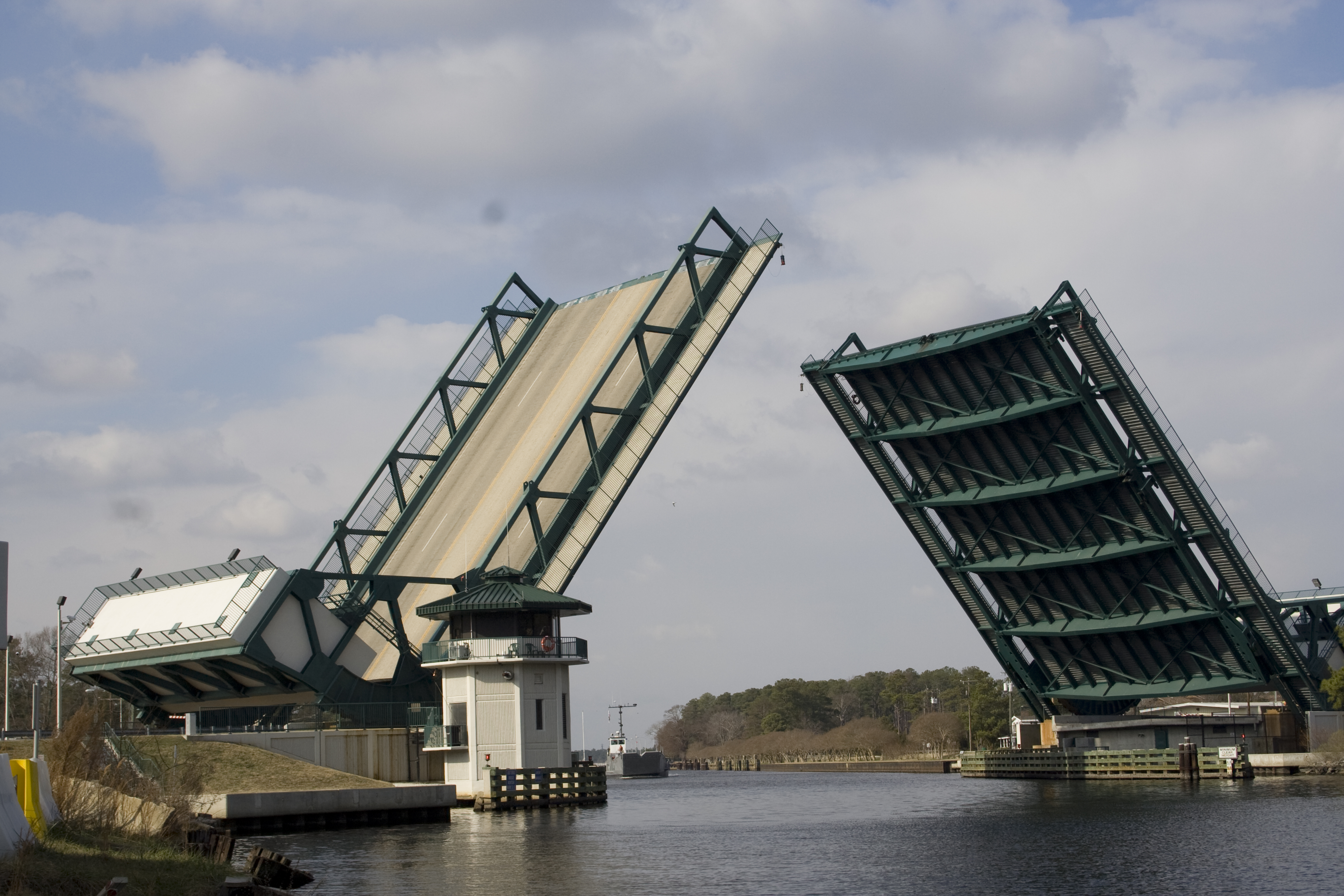
The current Great Bridge Bridge was completed in 2004.

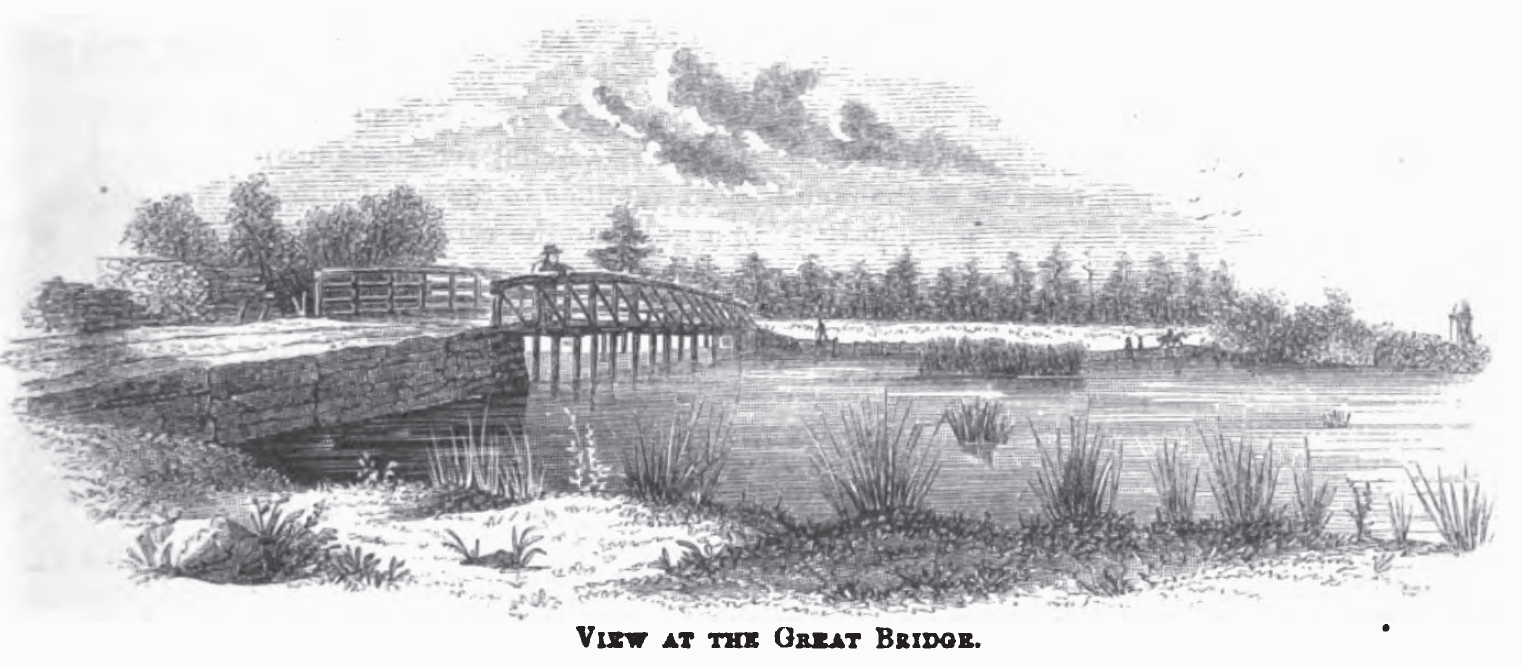
A bridge over the Elizabeth River estuary in the 18th century

The Great Bridge Bridge is a double-leaf rolling bascule drawbridge that carries Battlefield Blvd (State Route 168 Business) across the Atlantic Intracoastal Waterway in Chesapeake, Virginia. It was constructed in 2004 by the Army Corps of Engineers and operated by the City of Chesapeake. It has a mean daily traffic of 35,000 vehicles. The current bridge cost $46 million.

In September 2018 a lightning strike disabled the bridge's electronics, requiring manual operation. Normally the bridge opens automatically, on the hour, from 6 am to 7 pm. Vessels can request an opening from 7 pm to 6 am.

== Earlier bridges ==
On December 9, 1775, when the Battle of Great Bridge was fought, a bridge spanned the main channel of the Elizabeth River, in the middle of a broad marshy estuary. A raised causeway spanned the rest of the estuary.

A new bridge was built at Great Bridge, Virginia, in 1859, after the construction of Albemarle and Chesapeake Canal (which is part of the Atlantic Intracoastal Waterway).

During the American Civil War a bridge crossing at Great Bridge was destroyed.

A new two-lane swing bridge replaced the late 19th century bridge in 1943.
