= Virginia State Route 238 =

State highway in Virginia, United States

State Route 238

Route information
- Maintained by VDOT
- Length: 7.75 mi (12.47 km)
- Existed: 1940–present

Major junctions
- West end: US 60 in Newport News
- I-64 in Newport News; SR 143 in Newport News; US 17 near Yorktown
- East end: USCG Training Center near Yorktown

Location
- Country: United States
- State: Virginia
- Counties: City of Newport News, York

Highway system
- Virginia Routes; Interstate; US; Primary; Secondary; Byways; History; HOT lanes
← SR 237	→ SR 239

State Route 238 (SR 238) is a primary state highway in the U.S. state of Virginia. The state highway runs 7.75 miles (12.47 km) from U.S. Route 60 (US 60) in Newport News east to United States Coast Guard Training Center – Yorktown near Yorktown. SR 238 connects Interstate 64 (I-64) with Naval Weapons Station Yorktown, the Yorktown portion of Colonial National Historical Park, and the Coast Guard training center. The majority of SR 238 is part of the Washington–Rochambeau Revolutionary Route.

== Route description ==
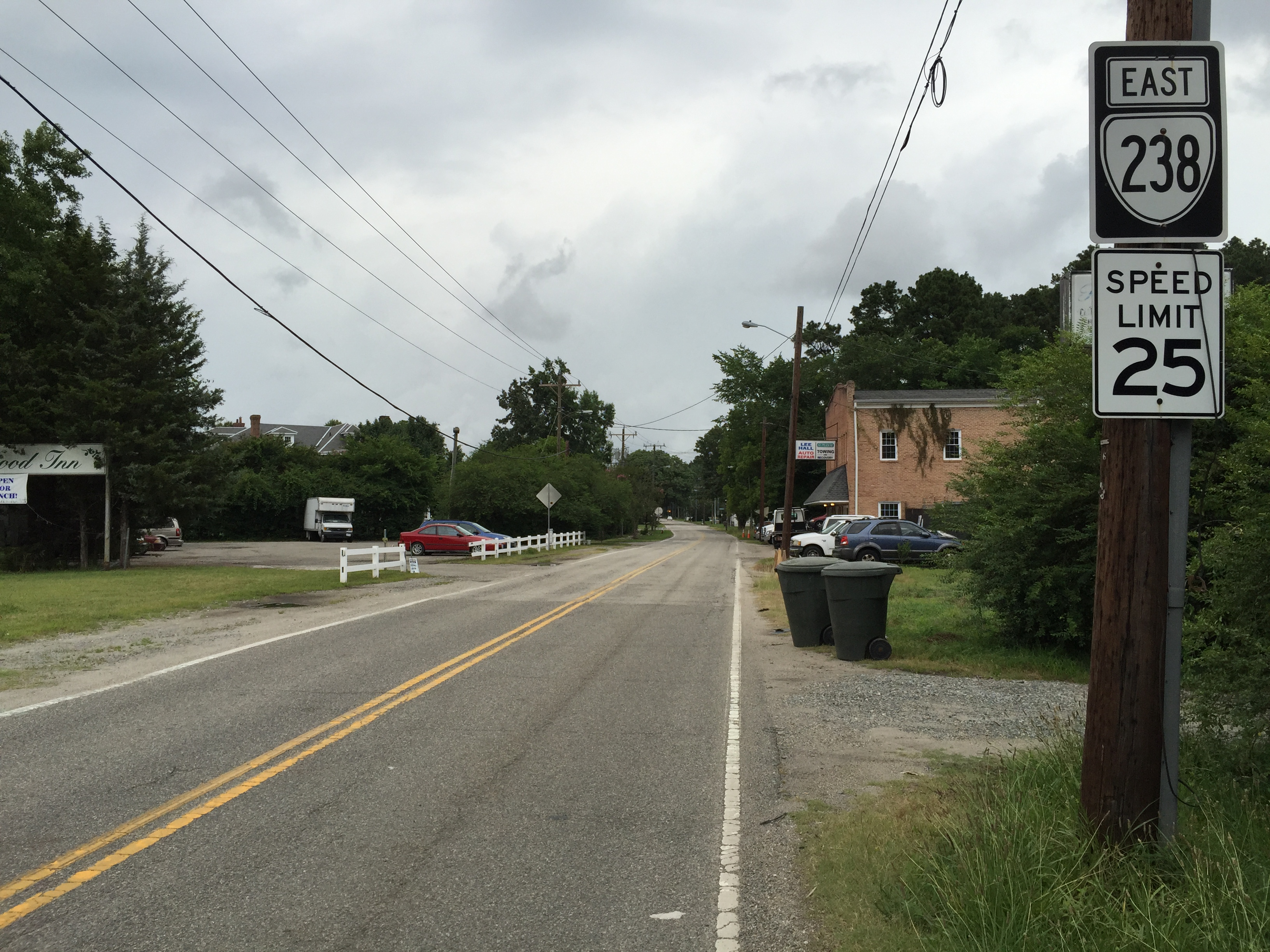
View east at the west end of SR 238 at US 60 in Newport News

SR 238 begins at an oblique intersection with US 60 (Warwick Boulevard) in the Lee Hall area of the independent city of Newport News. The state highway heads north as two-lane undivided Yorktown Road and immediately has a grade crossing of CSX's Peninsula Subdivision. SR 238 passes the Lee Hall Mansion before expanding to a four-lane divided highway through its partial diamond interchange with I-64. The interchange provides access to and from the direction of Norfolk; access to I-64 in the direction of Richmond is provided by SR 143 (Jefferson Avenue) at the next intersection. SR 238 continues north as a two-lane undivided road whose name changes to Old Williamsburg Road on entering York County. The state highway gradually curves to the east as it follows the edge of Naval Weapons Station Yorktown, whose main entrance is in the community of Lackey.

East of Lackey, SR 238 enters Colonial National Historical Park, where the highway passes through a forested area with scattered residential subdivisions. The state highway turns southeast onto Goosley Road while Old Williamsburg Road continues to the center of Yorktown. SR 238 intersects US 17 (George Washington Memorial Highway) before turning north onto Cook Road, then east on Moore House Road within a large field that was the site of fighting in the Revolutionary War Siege of Yorktown. Moore House Road heads west into the center of Yorktown and provides access to Colonial Parkway. SR 238 follows Moore House Road parallel to the York River, then veers inland along Ballard Street while Moore House Road continues straight into a residential neighborhood. SR 238 reaches its eastern terminus just beyond Nelson Road at the entrance to United States Coast Guard Training Center – Yorktown.

== Major intersections ==
County	Location	mi	km	Destinations	Notes
City of Newport News		0.00	0.00	US 60 (Warwick Boulevard)	Western terminus
City of Newport News		0.94	1.51	I-64 east – Hampton, Norfolk	I-64 exit 247
City of Newport News		1.12	1.80	SR 143 (Jefferson Avenue) to I-64 west	
York				SR 1020 east (Old Williamsburg Road) – Yorktown, Waterfront, Colonial Parkway, American Revolution Museum at Yorktown	former SR 238 east
York		5.62	9.04	US 17 (George Washington Memorial Highway) – Gloucester, Newport News, Colonial Parkway, Historic Yorktown	
York	Yorktown			Ballard Street - Yorktown, Battlefield Visitor Center, Waterfront	former SR 238 west
York	Yorktown	7.75	12.47	Training Center Yorktown	Eastern terminus
1.000 mi = 1.609 km; 1.000 km = 0.621 mi: Concurrency terminus

none	Spurs of SR 39; 1923–1928	SR 392 >
< SR 513	District 5 State Routes; 1928–1933	SR 515 >
< SR 517	District 5 State Routes; 1928–1933	SR 519 >
