= U.S. Route 60 in Virginia =

Section of U.S. Numbered Highway in Virginia, United States

U.S. Route 60
- US 60 highlighted in red

Route information
- Maintained by VDOT
- Length: 302.69 mi (487.13 km)
- Existed: 1926–present

Major junctions
- West end: I-64 / US 60 near Callaghan
- I-81 / US 11 in Lexington; US 29 in Amherst; US 15 in Sprouses Corner; US 1 / US 301 in Richmond; I-295 in Sandston; US 17 / US 258 in Newport News; I-64 in Hampton; US 460 in Norfolk; US 13 in Virginia Beach; US 58 in Virginia Beach
- East end: Harbour Point/Rudee Point Road in Virginia Beach

Location
- Country: United States
- State: Virginia
- Counties: Alleghany, City of Covington, Rockbridge, City of Lexington, City of Buena Vista, Amherst, Nelson, Appomattox, Buckingham, Cumberland, Powhatan, Chesterfield, City of Richmond, Henrico, New Kent, James City, City of Williamsburg, York, City of Newport News, City of Hampton, City of Norfolk, City of Virginia Beach

Highway system
- United States Numbered Highway System; List; Special; Divided; Virginia Routes; Interstate; US; Primary; Secondary; Byways; History; HOT lanes
← SR 591	→ SR 610

U.S. Route 60 (US 60) in the Commonwealth of Virginia runs 303 miles (488 km) west to east through the central part of the state, generally close to and paralleling the Interstate 64 corridor, except for the crossing of the Blue Ridge Mountains, and in the South Hampton Roads area.

Between Lexington in the Shenandoah Valley and Richmond, I-64 uses a lower elevation crossing of the Blue Ridge Mountains located about 30 miles (48 km) further north, where it runs parallel to U.S. Route 250 through Rockfish Gap. In contrast, through this section, the older US 60 is mostly a rural two-lane road. With the crossing of the Blue Ridge Mountains at Humphreys Gap at a higher altitude in more rugged terrain, US 60 in this area offers much more challenging and weather-sensitive driving conditions, as well as a history of many crashes in the years before I-64 was completed. The original US 60 alignment through Lynchburg and Glasgow is now largely carried by US 501, US 460, and US 360; the Glasgow section is lower but much curvier than I-64

East of north–south U.S. Route 29 (which runs parallel to the eastern slope of the Blue Ridge), US 60 and I-64 gradually converge as they pass through the rolling hills of the rocky Piedmont region in an easterly direction to reach the Fall Line at Richmond, where they again become very close.

From Richmond east to the harbor area near the mouth of Hampton Roads, US 60 again essentially parallels I-64 through Williamsburg and the Historic Triangle region, extending down the Virginia Peninsula east to the Hampton Roads Bridge-Tunnel. A few miles south of the bridge-tunnel, in Norfolk, US 60 diverges to follow the south shoreline of the Chesapeake Bay through Ocean View and past the south entrance to the Chesapeake Bay Bridge-Tunnel to reach Cape Henry. There it curves south to run along the Atlantic Ocean shoreline to end near the south end of the Virginia Beach resort strip.

The first developed portions of US 60 in Virginia included the Manchester Turnpike, later known as the Midlothian Turnpike, west from Richmond and the James River and Kanawha Turnpike west of Lexington into West Virginia.

== Route description ==
In Virginia, as a through-route, U.S. 60 was largely replaced by Interstate 64. The latter is roughly parallel, although there is a separation of over 30 miles north and south between Lexington and Richmond.

In South Hampton Roads, the roads also separate. I-64 became part of the circumferential Hampton Roads Beltway and looping far south and west of Norfolk, rather than reaching the Atlantic Ocean. Although older, Route 60 continues its west to east travel, becoming the public roadway actually closest to the waters of the Chesapeake Bay and the Atlantic Ocean terminating near the traditional resort strip at Virginia Beach.

=== West Virginia to Lexington ===
U.S. Route 60 enters the state concurrent with I-64 near the top of the Eastern Continental Divide in the Appalachian Mountains and crosses the portions of the Great Valley, passing the city of Covington, and town of Clifton Forge and the city of Lexington.

=== Blue Ridge Mountains to Richmond ===
At Lexington, the newer Interstate route swings north, concurrent with I-81 to Staunton where it again turns east. The variation between the routes was largely due to terrain for the crossing of the Blue Ridge Mountains. U.S. 60 crosses at White's Gap; I-64 uses Rockfish Gap. East of the Blue Ridge, the two pathways gradually converge, meeting again at Richmond.

Although US 60 offers a bucolic interlude for many motorists in comparison with I-64, the western portion of the Lexington-Richmond section of US 60 can be very difficult to drive, especially for larger vehicles such as motor homes and commercial vehicles, or any vehicles during inclement weather. It was notorious for deadly crashes in the years before I-64 was completed.

=== I-64 via Rockfish Gap, Charlottesville ===
The newer I-64 uses Rockfish Gap, a lower elevation wind gap which was also selected for a vital railroad crossing by Virginia's legendary 19th century state engineer, Claudius Crozet. Even that crossing, at Afton Mountain, can be very treacherous, and has been particularly notorious for accidents during reduced periods of visibility, motivating the state to install an innovative pavement lighting system. East of the mountain, I-64 passes Charlottesville and has easy grades on its way to Richmond.

=== Older route via Buena Vista, Amherst, Cumberland ===
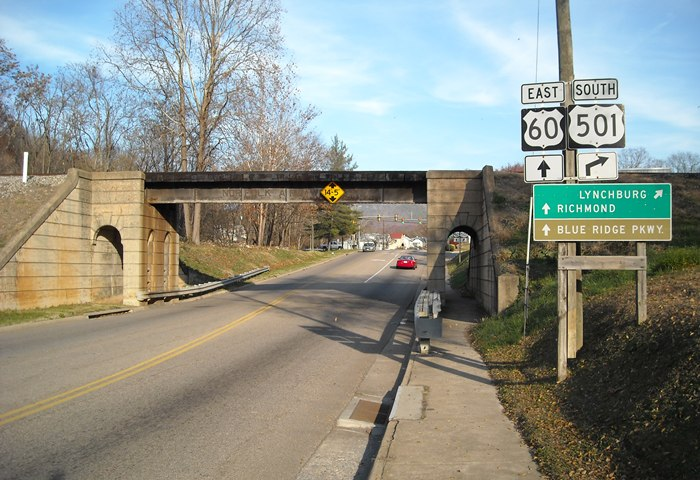
US 60 east at the junction with US 501 in Buena Vista

From Lexington, US 60 runs easterly across the Blue Ridge Mountains. The switchbacks and grades along the crossing of the Blue Ridge Mountains still used by U.S. 60 combine to form a very hilly and treacherous section. The 30 miles (48 km) east of Lexington become virtually impassable by most vehicles during inclement weather, particularly snow and ice. A short distance east of Interstate 81, as it passes through Buena Vista, even before leaving the city limits, the roadway immediately begins a steep climb. The roadway has many switchbacks and on both the eastern and western slopes, with White's Gap at the peak. After descending on the eastern side, travelers reach Amherst, where Route 60 intersects north–south U.S. Route 29.

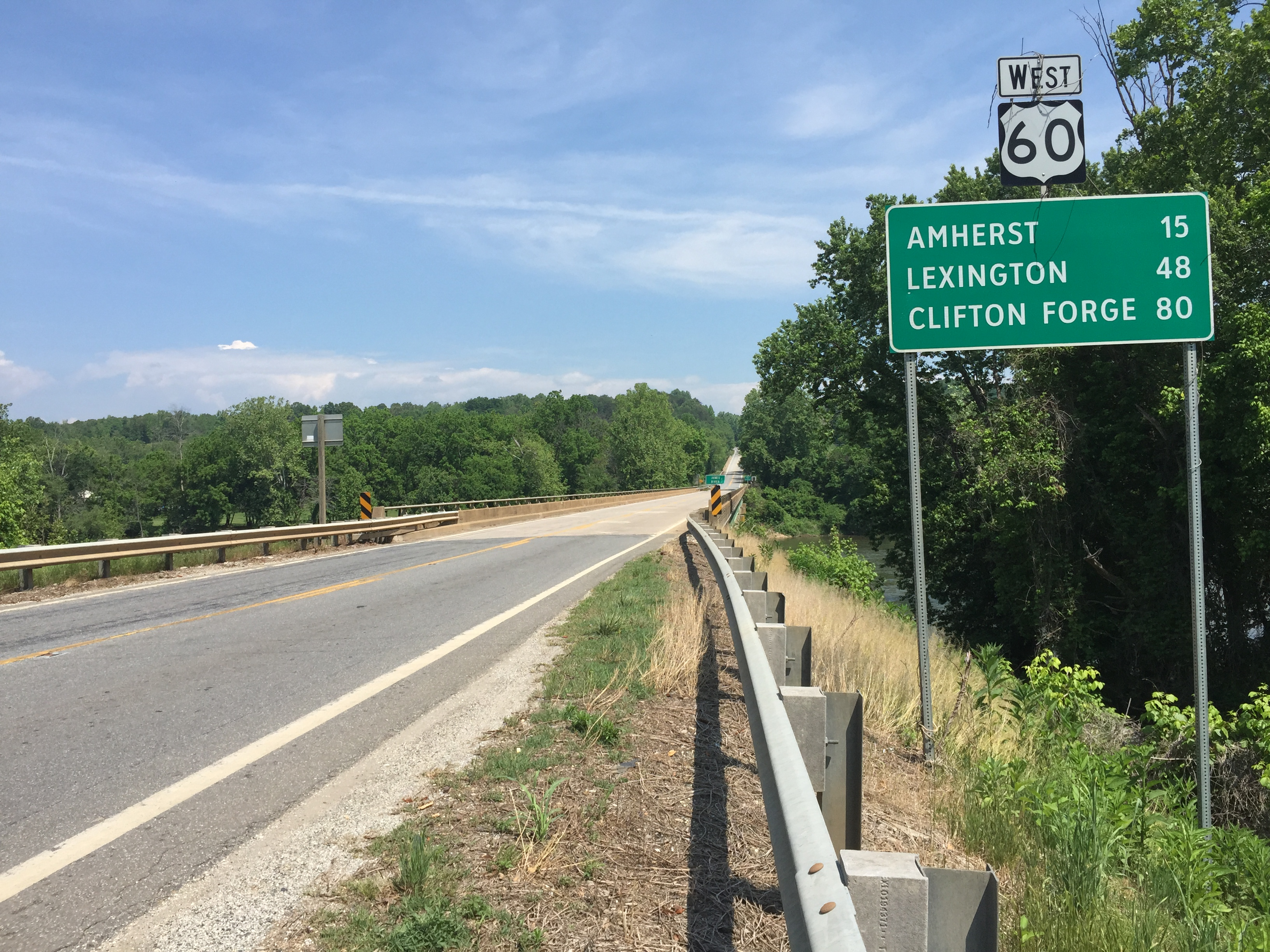
View west along US 60 at the bridge over the James River between Appomattox and Nelson counties

Continuing east, there is an additional shorter section of mountainous terrain before the road levels out somewhat into the rolling Piedmont region through the middle belt of the state. At Sprouse's Corner in Buckingham County, north–south U.S. Route 15 is crossed. This is the last major intersection until reaching the outskirts of Richmond.

The road is two lanes for most of its journey eastward from Lexington, but widens to four lanes in Powhatan Virginia. Crossing into Chesterfield County, it intersects State Route 288, a semi-circumferential expressway around the southwestern quadrant of Metropolitan Richmond and becoming Midlothian Turnpike.

=== Richmond ===
East of VA-288, Route 60 continues a few miles into the community of Midlothian. From this point east, the road becomes almost a continuous business district and widens to six lanes through the urban parts of Chesterfield County and the westernmost portion in the city of Richmond.

U.S. 60 in the Richmond area enters on Midlothian Turnpike. The road largely follows the path of the old Manchester Turnpike, built early in the 18th century. Nearby, remnants of the Chesterfield Railroad, first in Virginia can be seen just south of the current highway. Midlothian was the site of coal mines after about 1700, with product transported overland to Manchester which was Richmond's sister city south of the river (until they merged in 1910). At Manchester, ships could dock in the navigable waters of the James River just east of the fall line.

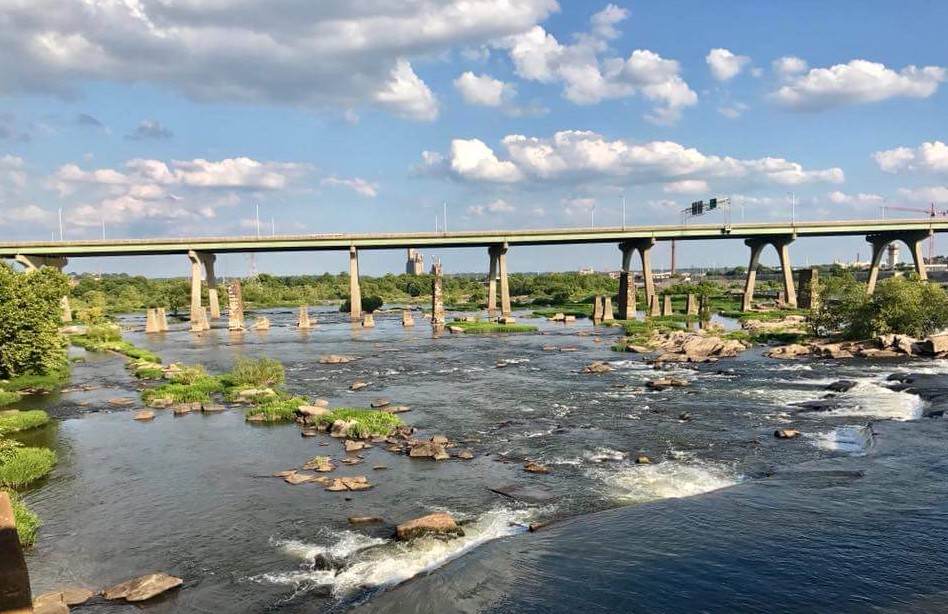
Manchester Bridge over the James River

U.S. Route 60 crosses the James River on the Manchester Bridge into downtown Richmond. Nearby in Richmond, it crosses U.S. Route 360, technically a spur. From Richmond, U.S. 360 extends southwest to Danville, Virginia just north of the North Carolina border and northeast to Reedville, Virginia on the Chesapeake Bay.

Rt. 60 leaves the Church Hill section of Richmond on Government Road and the Williamsburg Road, which follows the old Richmond-Williamsburg Stage Road for some distance in Henrico County. This area was the scene of several major American Civil War battles during the Peninsula Campaign in 1862, and the roadway borders federal cemeteries at Government Road near the city limits and at Seven Pines. There Nine Mile Road brings State Route 33 to the intersection.

=== Richmond to Hampton Roads ===
East of downtown Richmond, US 60 again parallels I-64 east along the Virginia Peninsula through the much flatter coastal plains of the Tidewater region of Virginia to reach the harbor at Hampton Roads. Most of the route immediately east of Richmond is two laned. In the years before I-64 was built, a hilly three-laned portion of US 60 in eastern Henrico County east of Seven Pines (and the junction of much newer I-295) was infamous for many years for its center "suicide lane". Most of this section is now two-laned, with the center lane area reserved for turning lanes.

East of Bottoms Bridge, in New Kent County and western James City County, US 60 is a lightly traveled four-lane divided highway that is sometimes used as an alternate route to Interstate 64 when the latter becomes congested. Near Anderson's Corner at the junction of Virginia State Route 30 (near I-64 at exit 227), US 60 swings somewhat south to pass through Toano and Norge to reach Williamsburg, which I-64 bypasses slightly to the north. (First designated through the area in the late 1920s, US 60 also has a shorter bypass of the Historic District which encompasses most Colonial Williamsburg attractions). At Williamsburg, the National Park Service's Colonial Parkway leads to both Jamestown and Yorktown.

At milepost 238 on I-64, Virginia State Route 143 begins. As Colonial Williamsburg opened, this four-laned route was built in the 1930s as Merrimack Trail to supplement US Route 60. It parallels both US 60 and I-64 all the way east through Williamsburg, James City, and York counties, and through Newport News to reach Fort Monroe (near the Hampton Roads Bridge-Tunnel) in Hampton.

East of Williamsburg, US 60 passes the multiple Anheuser Busch developments in James City County, which include an office park, the Kingsmill Resort, its Williamsburg brewery, and the Busch Gardens Williamsburg theme park. East of there, US 60 narrows again to two lanes, passing through the historic Grove Community and past Carter's Grove Plantation in southeastern James City County.

=== Newport News ===
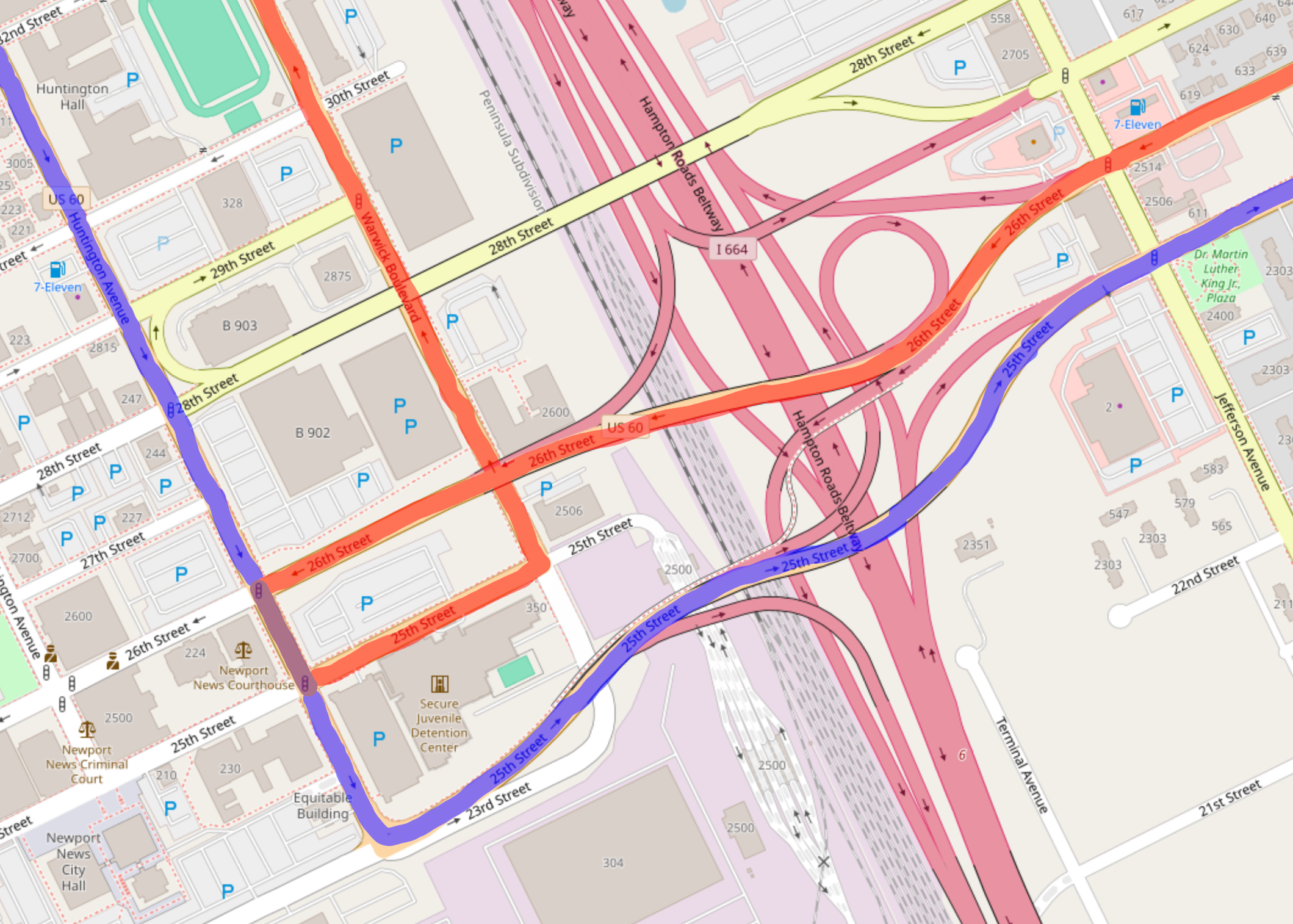
Alignment of US 60 in Newport News, demonstrating concurrency with itself Westbound lanes Eastbound lanes

After crossing Skiffe's Creek, the roadway enters the Lee Hall section of the city of Newport News, where it becomes Warwick Boulevard, a major thoroughfare in the independent city, and stretches over 20 miles (32 km) to downtown Newport News.

Warwick Boulevard, once a major through traffic route, and now mostly a local connector road, is largely paralleled by newer highways, Interstate 64 and State Route 143 (Jefferson Avenue). These, with more lanes and higher speed limits, in combination with Warwick Boulevard, form the major east–west highways through modern-day Newport News.

The road was named for the former Warwick County, Virginia, one of the original eight shires of Virginia which consolidated with the City of Newport News in 1958 and assumed the better-known name. Warwick County was named in 1634 for Robert Rich (1587–1658), second Earl of Warwick and a prominent member of the Virginia Company of London, the proprietary venture which founded Jamestown in 1607. The western reaches of Warwick Boulevard transverse the Denbigh area, long the county seat of Warwick County.

A notable section of Huntington Avenue (the block between 25th and 26th streets) carries US 60 in both directions overlapping, a very rare configuration possibly only shared with US 19 Truck in Pittsburgh.

Notable sites along Warwick Boulevard or close by, west to east, include:

- Lee Hall (several attractions)
- Fort Eustis
- Warwick Line
- Warwick County Courthouses
- Christopher Newport University
- Ferguson Center for the Performing Arts
- Riverside Regional Medical Center
- Mariners' Museum and Park
- Hilton Village
- Huntington Park
- Newport News Shipbuilding
- CSX coal piers

Several miles east of Lee Hall, the road widens to four lanes near the entrance to Fort Eustis. From there, as Warwick Boulevard, US 60 stretches about 18 miles (29 km) to reach downtown Newport News. In the early 21st century, Newport News was in the midst of a widening project to expand portions of Warwick Boulevard to six lanes. Another project in Newport News to relocate and widen the portion of Route 60 west of Fort Eustis and construct a new crossing of Skiffe's Creek is in a planning stage.

Route 60 follows 25th Street out of downtown Newport News into the city of Hampton.

=== Hampton ===
When it enters Hampton, 25th Street becomes Kecoughtan Road and Route 60 follows it to downtown. It runs through the Wythe and Southampton neighborhoods, forming the northern boundary of the Olde Wythe Historic District. In the 1940s and 50s Kecoughtan Road was one of Hampton and Newport News's primary commercial centers.

It then turns onto Settlers' Landing Road and follows it through downtown Hampton and across Hampton River on the Booker T. Washington Bridge to join Interstate 64 in crossing Hampton Roads in the Hampton Roads Bridge Tunnel. (As a historical note, prior to 1957, when the bridge-tunnel was completed, the crossing was via a car ferry service. The bridge-tunnel was expanded to 4 lanes and tolls removed in the mid-1970s.)

Notable sites along US-60 in Hampton or close by, west to east, include:

- Old Wythe Historic District
- Little England Chapel
- Blackbeard's Point
- Historic Little England
- St. John's Episcopal Church
- Virginia Air and Space Center
- Hampton University
- Emancipation Oak
- Hampton National Cemetery
- Phoebus
- Fort Monroe

=== South Hampton Roads: a shoreline route to Virginia Beach ===
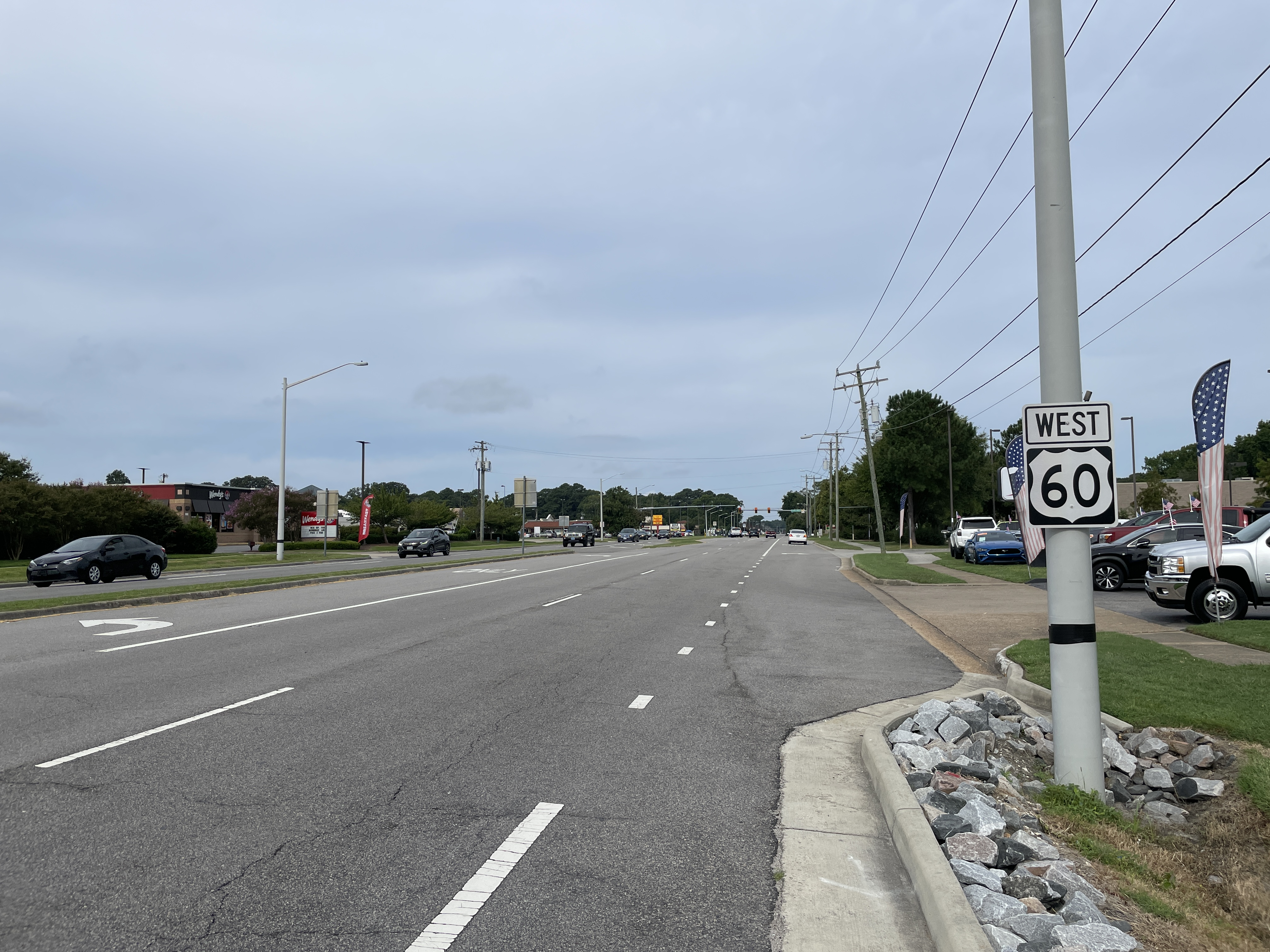
US 60 westbound past US 13 in Virginia Beach

After passing the tip of Willoughby Spit and a bridge across the north shore of Willoughby Bay, back on land, US 60 exits I-64. The Interstate continues southerly into Norfolk as part of the Hampton Roads Beltway, and in conjunction with Interstate 264, generally offers the fastest way to reach the oceanfront area of Virginia Beach.

However, US 60 offers a more scenic, if perhaps slower, alternative, by sticking to the shoreline of the bay and ocean to reach the same destination. After leaving I-64, US 60 shifts onto Ocean View Avenue, a four lane boulevard following the southern shoreline of the Chesapeake Bay, going through the Ocean View area of Norfolk.

At East Ocean View, then roadway swings away from the bay front and becomes Shore Drive, passing the entrance to the Naval Amphibious Base Little Creek at Little Creek, Virginia as it heads east into the city of Virginia Beach. After passing the Navy Base, Shore Drive again runs close to the bay front and crosses US 13 near the southern terminus of the Chesapeake Bay Bridge-Tunnel. US 60 continues as a 4-lane divided highway as it crosses over Lynnhaven Inlet on the Lesner Bridge and towards the First Landing State Park and Joint Expeditionary Base East at Cape Henry. At the end of the state park, the roadway briefly is called 83rd Street as it curves onto Atlantic Avenue, running parallel to the oceanfront from a few hundred feet to a block or so to the west passing through most of the most developed portion of the Oceanfront area of the resort city.

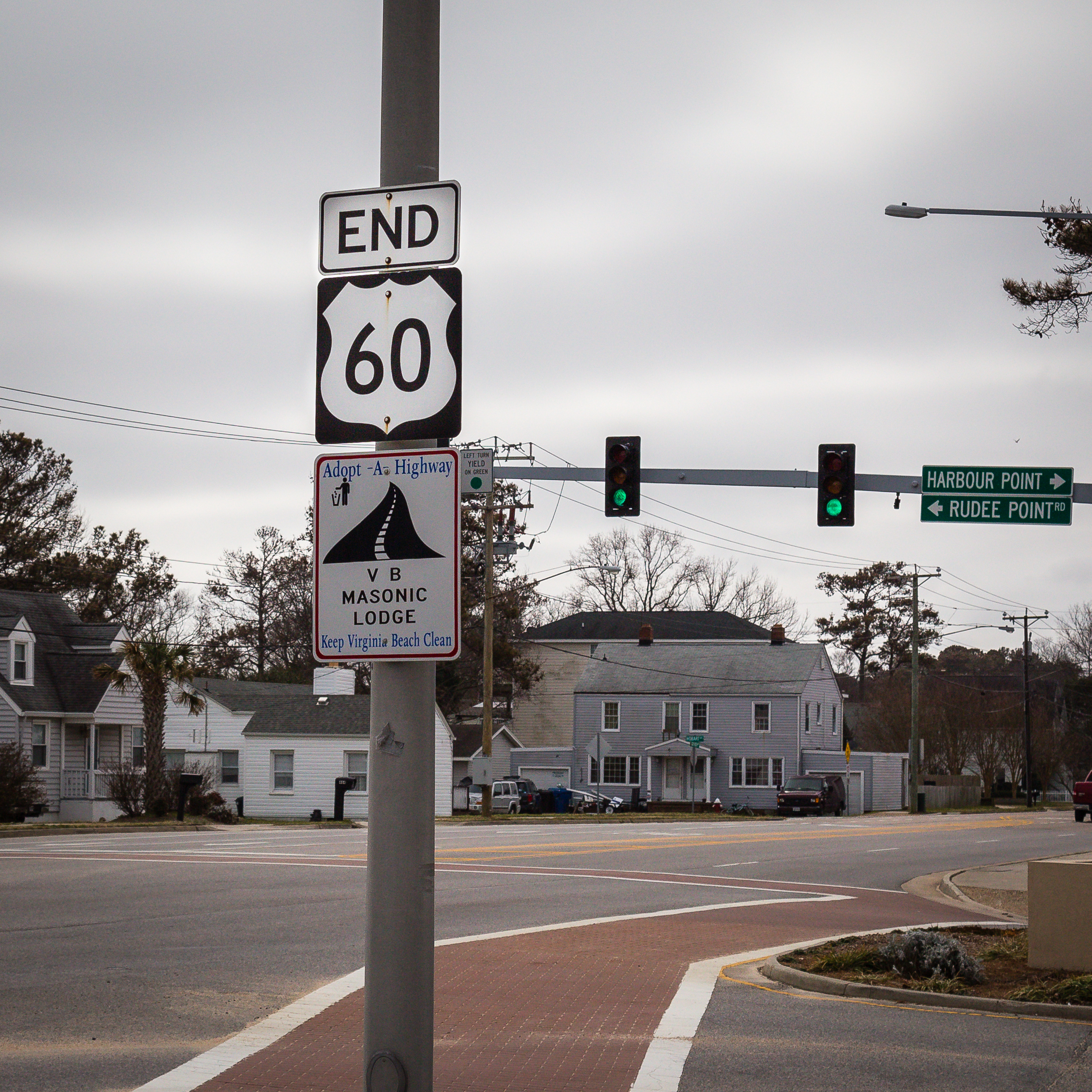
Eastern terminus of US 60, Virginia Beach

From Joint Expeditionary Base East to the terminus, the routing of US 60 is geographically north–south although it is signed as an east–west route. When Atlantic Avenue meets Pacific Avenue, US 60 continues straight onto Pacific Avenue, through the entire resort strip, passing 32nd Street, where it meets the eastern terminus of US 58, and 22nd and 21st Streets, which lead to and from the eastern terminus of both the former Virginia Beach-Norfolk Expressway (now I-264) respectively, continuing to meet the original Virginia Beach Boulevard at 17th Street. It then continues along Pacific over the Rudee Inlet Bridge to the highway's eastern terminus at the intersection of Harbour Point and Rudee Point Road in Virginia Beach. The road itself continues southwest back into the city as General Booth Boulevard.

== History ==
The Manchester Turnpike was a turnpike road in Chesterfield County, and was the first lengthy paved roadway in that state. It stretched from Manchester (now part of Richmond's Southside) west to Falling Creek near Midlothian, and is now known as Midlothian Turnpike, mostly forming part of US 60. In 1802, Chesterfield County's coal manufacturers and residents petitioned the Virginia General Assembly for permission to construct a turnpike between the port of Manchester and Falling Creek. The improved road was opened to travelers in 1804, and ran from Manchester along the old Buckingham road to Falling Creek, now the bridge on Old Buckingham Road west of Unison Drive.

== Major intersections ==
County	Location	mi	km	Exit	Destinations	Notes
Alleghany		0.00	0.00		I-64 west / US 60 west – White Sulphur Springs	West Virginia state line
Alleghany		1.83	2.95	1	Jerry's Run Trail	
Alleghany		7.16	11.52	7	SR 661	Eastbound exit and westbound entrance
Alleghany	Callaghan	10.01	16.11		I-64 east / SR 159 south (Midland Trail) to SR 311 – Lexington	Eastern end of I-64 concurrency; northern terminus of SR 159; US 60 east follows exit 10
City of Covington		14.79	23.80		To Riverside Street (SR 154) north / US 220	
City of Covington		15.76	25.36		US 220 north (Alleghany Avenue) – Hot Springs	Western end of US 220 concurrency
City of Covington		16.14	25.97		SR 18 south (Carpenter Drive)	Northern terminus of SR 18
Alleghany	Mallow	17.32	27.87		I-64 west – White Sulphur Springs	Western end of I-64 concurrency; US 60 west follows exit 16A
see I-64
Rockbridge		50.93	81.96		I-64 east / SR 623 (Fredericksburg Road) – Lexington	Eastern end of I-64 concurrency; US 60 east follows exit 50
Rockbridge					SR 850 west (Midland Trail)	former US 60 west
City of Lexington		57.30	92.22		US 11 Bus. south (Jefferson Street)	
City of Lexington		57.42	92.41		US 11 Bus. north (Main Street)	
Rockbridge		58.03	93.39		US 11 to I-64 west – Staunton, Natural Bridge, Roanoke	interchange
Rockbridge		60.18	96.85		I-81 to I-64 – Staunton, Natural Bridge, Roanoke	Exit 188 (I-81)
City of Buena Vista		63.86	102.77		US 501 south (Beech Avenue) – Lynchburg	Northern terminus of US 501
Rockbridge	No major junctions					
Amherst	Humphreys Gap	68.3	109.9		Blue Ridge Parkway	Interchange
Amherst					SR 778 (Lowesville Road) – Lowesville	former SR 158 north
Amherst	Amherst	89.93	144.73		US 29 Bus. (Main Street)	Roundabout
Amherst	Amherst	90.38	145.45		US 29 – Charlottesville, Lynchburg	interchange
Nelson	No major junctions					
Appomattox	Bent Creek	104.98	168.95		SR 26 south (Oakville Road) / SR 605 north (Riverside Drive) – Appomattox, Appomattox Historical Park, James River State Park	Northern terminus of SR 26
Buckingham	Mt. Rush	118.49	190.69		SR 24 west (Mt. Rush Highway) – Appomattox, Lynchburg, Appomattox Historical Park	Eastern terminus of SR 24
Buckingham	Dentons Corner	120.51	193.94		SR 56 west (South James River Highway) – Lovingston	Eastern terminus of SR 56
Buckingham	Sprouses Corner	126.29	203.24		US 15 (James Madison Highway) – Dillwyn, Farmville	
Cumberland	Hillcrest	138.73	223.26		SR 45 south (Cumberland Road) – Farmville	Western end of SR 45 concurrency
Cumberland		142.23	228.90		SR 13 east (Old Buckingham Road) – Tobaccoville	Western terminus of SR 13
Cumberland		143.58	231.07		SR 45 north (Cartersville Road) / SR 682 south (Northfield Road) – Cartersville	
Powhatan					SR 601 (Lockin Road) / SR 684 (Bell Road) to SR 621 – Cartersville	former SR 27 north
Powhatan		159.23	256.26		US 522 north (Maidens Road) / SR 1002 (Emmanuel Church Road) – Gum Spring, Winchester	Southern terminus of US 522
Powhatan	Powhatan	161.08	259.23		SR 300 south (Scottville Road) – Powhatan Courthouse Historic District	Northern terminus of SR 300
Powhatan	Plain View				SR 13 west (Old Buckingham Road) – Powhatan	Eastern terminus of SR 13
Chesterfield	Buckingham	173.88	279.83		SR 288 to I-64 / I-95 / US 360 – Charlottesville, Amelia, Chesterfield	interchange
Chesterfield	Midlothian	178.23	286.83		SR 147 east (Huguenot Road) / SR 653 (Courthouse Road)	west terminus of SR 147
Chesterfield		181.14	291.52		SR 76 (Powhite Parkway)	interchange
Chesterfield		183.39	295.14		SR 150 (Chippenham Parkway) / to Powhite Parkway	interchange
City of Richmond		185.55	298.61		SR 161	interchange
City of Richmond					US 60 Truck east (Midlothian Turnpike)	
City of Richmond					Forest Hill Avenue	former SR 417 west
City of Richmond		187.97	302.51		US 1 / US 301 (Cowardin Avenue)	
City of Richmond		188.53	303.41		To US 360 (Hull Street)	Interchange; westbound exit and eastbound entrance; former SR 416 south
City of Richmond				Manchester Bridge over James River		
City of Richmond					To East Byrd Street east (Downtown Expressway) / SR 195 east / I-64 / I-95	
City of Richmond					To East Canal Street west (Downtown Expressway) / SR 195 / I-195 west / I-64	
City of Richmond		189.27	304.60		SR 147 west (East Main Street)	west end of SR 147 overlap
City of Richmond		189.72	305.32		US 360 west / US 60 Truck west (South 14th Street)	east end of SR 147 overlap; west end of US 360 overlap
City of Richmond		190.10	305.94		US 360 east (North 18th Street)	Eastern end of US 360 concurrency
City of Richmond					25th Street	west end of SR 5 overlap
City of Richmond		190.83	307.11		SR 5 east (East Main Street)	east end of SR 5 overlap
Henrico	Sandston	196.25	315.83		SR 156 north (Airport Drive) to I-64 / I-295 – Richmond International Airport	Western end of SR 156 concurrency
Henrico	Seven Pines	197.75	318.25		SR 33 west (East Nine Mile Road) – Highland Springs	Western end of SR 33 concurrency
Henrico		199.13	320.47		I-295 to I-64 / I-95 – Washington, Rocky Mount, NC	Exit 28 (I-295)
Henrico		201.37	324.07		SR 156 south (Elko Road)	Eastern end of SR 156 concurrency
New Kent	Bottoms Bridge	204.13	328.52		SR 33 east / SR 249 east (New Kent Highway) to I-64 – West Point	Eastern end of SR 33 concurrency
New Kent		208.16	335.00		SR 106 (Emmaus Church Road / Roxbury Road) to I-64	former SR 163 south
New Kent	Providence Forge	213.66	343.85		SR 155 (Courthouse Road) to I-64 – New Kent, Charles City	
James City		227.29	365.79		SR 30 (Barhamsville Road / Rochambeau Drive) to I-64 – West Point, Richmond	
James City	Norge				SR 607 (Croaker Road) to I-64 – York River State Park	former SR 188 north
James City	Lightfoot				SR 614 (Centerville Road) to SR 5 – Jamestown	
James City	Lightfoot	233.42	375.65		SR 199 to I-64 – Richmond, Eastern State Hospital	interchange
City of Williamsburg					Ironbound Road	former SR 615 south
City of Williamsburg					Richmond Road	former SR 162 east
York		238.44	383.73		SR 132 to I-64 – Richmond, Williamsburg, Yorktown	
City of Williamsburg		239.10	384.79		SR 5 east (Capitol Landing Road) to I-64	Western end of SR 5 concurrency
City of Williamsburg					Second Street	former SR 162 east
City of Williamsburg		239.66	385.70		SR 5 west (Lafayette Street)	Eastern end of SR 5 concurrency; former SR 162 west
James City		241.60	388.82		SR 199 to I-64 – Yorktown, Richmond, Jamestown	interchange
York		241.95	389.38		I-64 – Richmond, Norfolk, Busch Gardens	interchange; I-64 exit 243A
City of Newport News		248.97	400.68		SR 238 east (Yorktown Road)	
City of Newport News		250.58	403.27		SR 105 to I-64 – Yorktown, Fort Eustis	interchange
City of Newport News		253.92	408.64		SR 173 (Denbigh Boulevard) to I-64	
City of Newport News		256.15	412.23		To Oyster Point Road (SR 171 east) / I-64	Western terminus of SR 171
City of Newport News		259.43	417.51		SR 312 east (J. Clyde Morris Boulevard) to I-64	Western terminus of SR 312
City of Newport News		260.50	419.23		SR 306 east (Harpersville Road)	Western terminus of SR 306
City of Newport News		261.99	421.63		SR 152 north (Main Street)	south terminus of SR 152
City of Newport News		263.07	423.37		US 17 / US 258 (Mercury Boulevard / SR 32) to I-64 – Hampton, Norfolk, James River Bridge	interchange
City of Newport News					SR 351 east (39th Street)	direct access eastbound only; westbound traffic U-turns at 38th and 42nd Streets
City of Newport News					I-664 / Jefferson Avenue (SR 143) – Hampton, Suffolk	I-664 exit 5; traffic from US 60 west to I-664 U-turns at 35th Street
City of Newport News					23rd Street - Newport News Marine Terminal	US 60 east and US 60 west overlap in the same direction on Huntington Avenue
City of Newport News					I-664 – Hampton, Suffolk	I-664 exit 6
City of Newport News					Jefferson Avenue	former SR 167
City of Hampton					LaSalle Avenue	former SR 167
City of Hampton		271.78	437.39		SR 143 west (Victoria Boulevard)	Western end of SR 143 concurrency
City of Hampton		272.17	438.02		SR 134 north (Armistead Avenue)	Southern terminus of SR 134
City of Hampton		273.30	439.83		I-64 west / SR 143 east (Woodland Road) – Williamsburg, Richmond	Eastern end of SR 143 concurrency; western end of I-64 concurrency; US 60 west follows exit 267
City of Hampton		273.63	440.36	268	SR 169 east (Mallory Street) – Fort Monroe	Western terminus of SR 169
Hampton Roads				Hampton Roads Bridge-Tunnel		
City of Norfolk		277.72	446.95	272	West Ocean View Avenue – Willoughby Spit	
City of Norfolk		279.46	449.75		I-64 east – Virginia Beach	Eastern end of I-64 concurrency; US 60 east follows exit 273
City of Norfolk					West Ocean View Avenue	former US 60 west
City of Norfolk		279.71	450.15		SR 168 south (Tidewater Drive) to I-64	interchange eastbound; intersection (with short overlap) westbound
City of Norfolk		280.66	451.68		US 460 west / US 60 Alt. west (Granby Street) to I-64	Eastern terminus of US 460
City of Norfolk		281.13	452.43		SR 194 south (Chesapeake Boulevard)	Northern terminus of SR 194
City of Norfolk		285.09	458.81		SR 170 west (East Little Creek Road)	Eastern terminus of SR 170
City of Virginia Beach		286.28	460.72		To Diamond Springs Road (SR 166 south) / I-64	Northern terminus of SR 166
City of Virginia Beach		288.09	463.64		SR 225 south (Independence Boulevard) to US 13	Northern terminus of SR 225
City of Virginia Beach		289.14	465.33		US 13 (Northampton Boulevard) – Chesapeake Bay Bridge-Tunnel, Norfolk, Suffolk, Airport	interchange
City of Virginia Beach		292.40	470.57		SR 279 south (North Great Neck Road)	Northern terminus of SR 279
City of Virginia Beach					SR 343 south – First Landing State Park	
City of Virginia Beach					SR 305 north – Fort Story	
City of Virginia Beach		300.55	483.69		US 58 west (Laskin Road) to I-264	Eastern terminus of US 58
City of Virginia Beach		301.20	484.73		To 22nd Street / I-264	
City of Virginia Beach		301.54	485.28		US 58 Bus. west (17th Street) to I-264	
City of Virginia Beach		302.75	487.23		Harbour Point/Rudee Point Road	Eastern terminus
1.000 mi = 1.609 km; 1.000 km = 0.621 mi: Concurrency terminus; Incomplete access

U.S. Route 60
Previous state: West Virginia	Virginia	Next state: Terminus
