= Manchester Bridge (Virginia) =

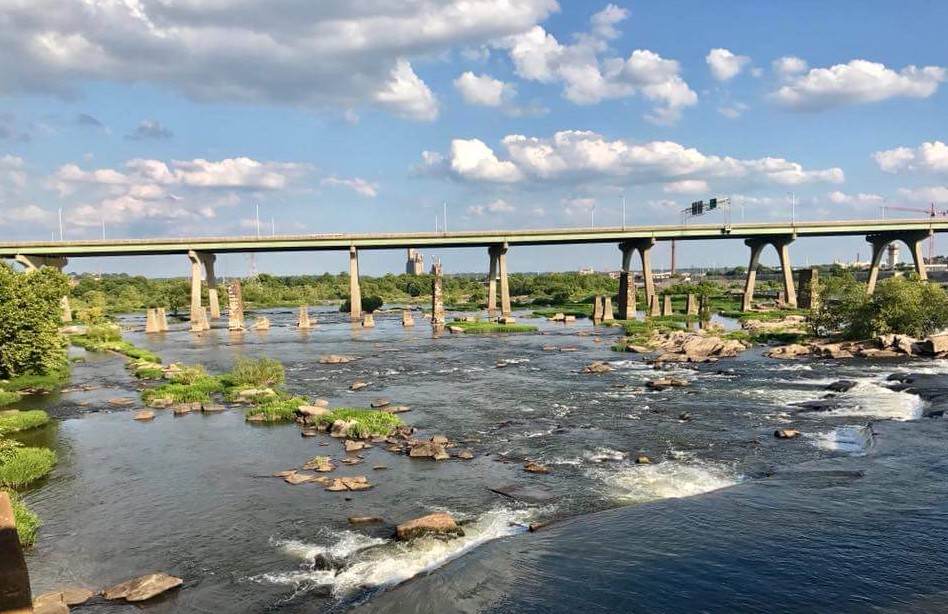
- Coordinates: 37°31′54″N 77°26′35″W
- Carries: US 60
- Crosses: James River
- Locale: Richmond, Virginia
- Official name: Manchester Bridge
- Maintained by: Richmond Dept. of Public Works

Characteristics
- Total length: 2,906 feet

History
- Opened: 1972

Statistics
- Toll: none

Location
- Interactive map of Manchester Bridge

Manchester Bridge in Richmond, Virginia carries U.S. Route 60 across the James River.

Its length is 2,906 feet (886 m), and it is unusually wide at 110 feet (33.5 m), due to a requirement in the Richmond-Manchester merger agreement of 1910 that a free pedestrian bridge be always provided between the two former cities. (The only other highway and pedestrian bridge between the cities at the time of the merger negotiations was a toll bridge, long a grievance of citizens of Manchester in particular.) The pedestrian walkway of the Manchester Bridge is located in the center, to afford access at the south end via stairs under the roadway without crossing heavy traffic lanes which are not signalled at that location. The north end has traffic signals for pedestrians to cross traffic lanes.

== History ==
The former Ninth Street ("Singing") Bridge was a primitive affair built rather low over the river, and whose creosote-treated wooden deck was fitted with strips of metal plates spaced a tire-track apart, to prevent excessive wear. As the tires rolled along, these plates, embossed to provide traction, would give off a high humming note—one that suddenly would rise by about a fifth as a vehicle crossed from south to north: presumably the embossed pattern changed at that point. Returning to Southside in the other lane, the note would remain the same all the way across.

The former Ninth Street Bridge was closed and barely escaped submergence during river flooding resulting from Hurricane Camille in 1969, strengthening the resolve of engineers that the replacement would be high above even flood levels of the river. The old bridge was submerged 3 years later during flooding from Hurricane Agnes, and was not returned to service, since the replacement Manchester Bridge was virtually complete.

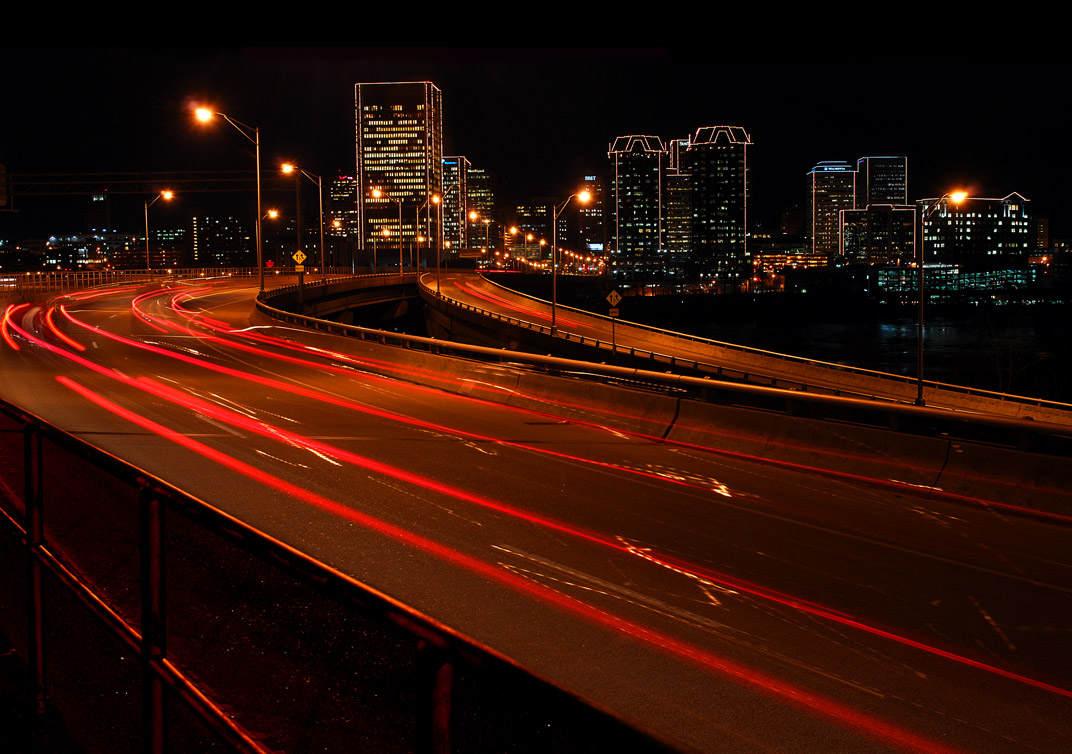
The Richmond skyline from the Manchester Bridge

In 1972, the Manchester Bridge replaced the old Ninth Street Bridge (also known as the "free bridge" and the "singing bridge", which remained in service during the construction. When almost completed, it was pressed into temporary service earlier than planned during James River flooding as a result of Hurricane Agnes. The bridge is high above the river, and is not considered in danger of flooding during periods when the river periodically floods.
