= Peninsula Fine Arts Center =

Art center

Coordinates: 37°3′49.8″N 76°29′22.5″W

The Peninsula Fine Arts Center (Pfac) was an art center located in Newport News, Virginia, and is associated with the Virginia Museum of Fine Arts. The center was last located at 101 Museum Drive on the grounds of the park surrounding the Mariners' Museum and was accredited with the American Alliance of Museums (AAM). It was formed in 1962 as the Peninsula Arts Association (PAA) by a group of Hampton Roads art supporters. The first official exhibit, staged in 1962, was a visit from a Virginia Museum Artmobile. It was one of less than 12 non-collecting art centers accredited by the AAM.

== Early years (1962-1980) ==
The PAA was originally housed in downtown Newport News in the former John W. Daniel public school Building (222 32nd Street) along with the original Christopher Newport College. The first official exhibit was staged in 1962. Before having venues, founders shared works of art hanging from clothes lines in their backyards.

In 1964, PAA was moved onto the new campus of Christopher Newport College before moving again to Hilton Village and later, Newmarket South Shopping Center. Major exhibitions that were too large for these venues were held in the Mariners’ Museum.

The PAA received a significant gift in 1975 that would prove to shape its future and help it establish independence when Newport News Shipbuilding donated its former hydraulics testing laboratory. The lab was located on two acres of land in Mariners’ Museum Park across from the Mariners’ Museum, at 101 Museum Drive. Following an intense renovation financed by community supporters, the PAA opened its new doors on November 5, 1978.

Further remodeling provided studios upstairs for the use of the Art Magnet Program of the Newport News Public School System. The program allowed talented students an opportunity to develop their artistic potential. This educational model would develop into workshops for students.

== Expansion, affiliation and accreditation (1981-1993) ==
In 1983, the PAA officially became the Peninsula Fine Arts Center and was named an Affiliate of the Virginia Museum of Fine Arts. As the Center started receiving more attention, David L. Peebles was named Chairman of the Capital Campaign in 1985 to raise $1.5 million for a new wing for Pfac. With the successful commitment of the private and public sector, the ground-breaking ceremony was held March 14, 1988. Williamsburg, VA architect Carlton Abbott designed the new addition.

The expansion and renovation provided an addition to triple exhibition space and to develop a suitable entry area, classrooms, workshop and art handling areas with provision for security, barrier-free accessibility and temperature, humidity and ventilation systems. Usable floor space increased from 4,000 square feet to over 15,000 square feet with three galleries, a hallway gallery, video gallery, four art classrooms and a meeting room.

The Opening of the Fine Arts Center was held on the weekend of April 30, 1989.

In 1993, the Center earned accreditation by the American Alliance of Museums.

== 50th anniversary ==
The Center celebrated its semicentennial in 2012 with several exhibitions. They included a national exhibit, "Art and the Animal," and a celebration of regional artists who have either taught or displayed work in other exhibitions at Pfac called "The Artists: Who We Are Past and Present." The latter was a photography exhibit illustrating the history of the Center and Virginia Peninsula with a juried photo exhibition. In the summer, Pfac held its nationally-recognized "Biennial" exhibition. The anniversary year culminated with the exhibition "50 Great American Artists" (curated by Michael Preble and David Mickenburg).

In 2013, PFAC agreed to a merger with Christopher Newport University. The University dissolved the Peninsula Fine Arts Center on December 31, 2020, and transferred PFAC's AAM accreditation to the university's newly completed art center. Courtney Gardner was the last Executive Director of PFAC. CNU's Mary M. Torggler Fine Arts Center carries on the legacy of PFAC.
