= Dandy, Virginia =

Unincorporated community in Virginia, US

Coordinates: 37.212004°N 76.429586°W

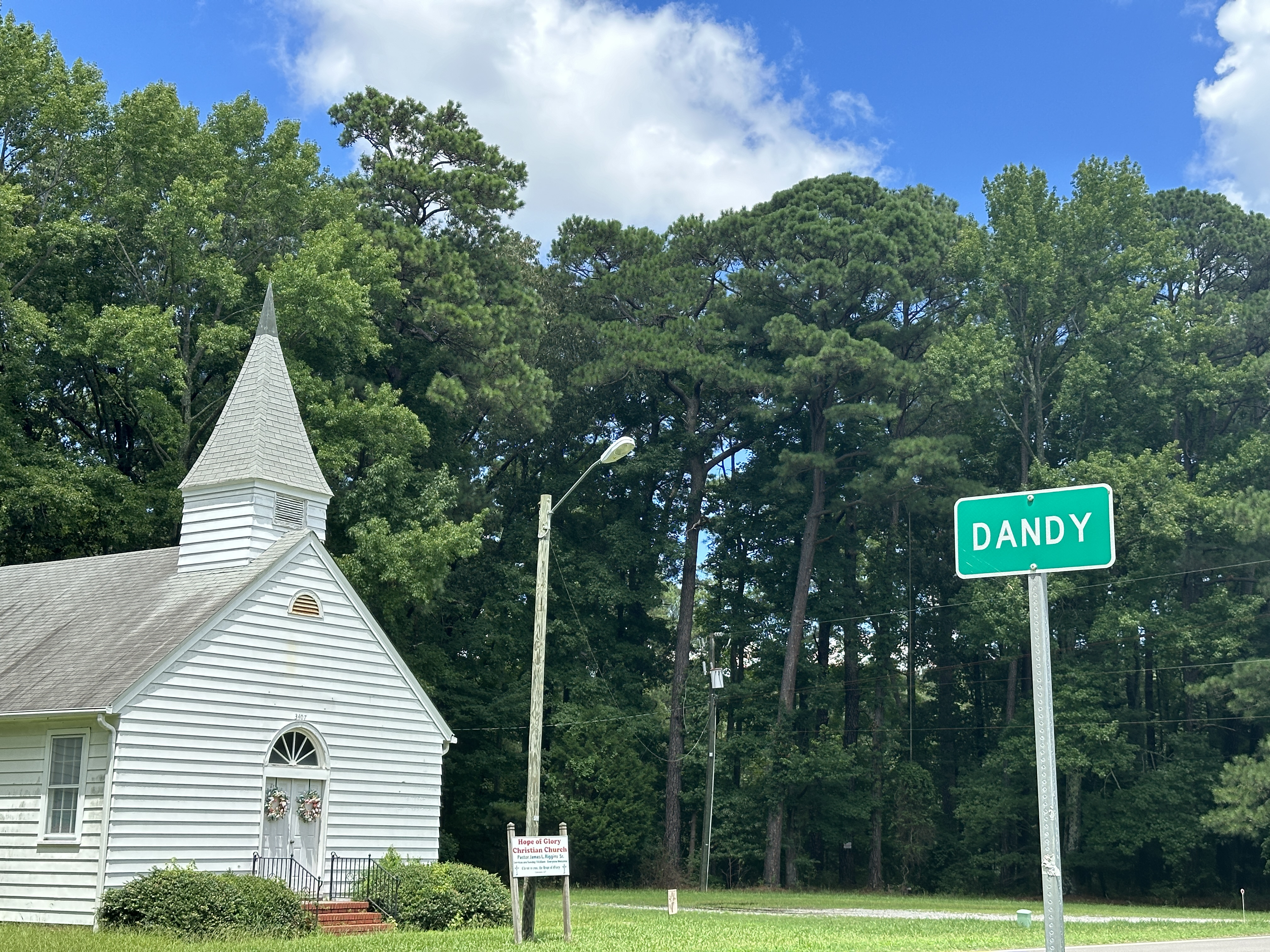
A church with a road sign that says Dandy

Dandy is an unincorporated community in York County, Virginia, United States.

== History ==
A post office called Dandy was established in 1906, and remained in operation until 1934. The origin of the name "Dandy" is obscure.
