= Virginia State Route 143 =

State highway in eastern Virginia, US

State Route 143

Route information
- Maintained by VDOT
- Length: 35.39 mi (56.95 km)
- Existed: mid-1940s–present

Major junctions
- West end: Camp Peary near Williamsburg
- I-64 near Williamsburg; SR 199 near Williamsburg; I-64 in Newport News; US 17 / US 258 / SR 32 in Newport News; I-664 in Newport News; US 60 in Hampton
- East end: US 258 at Fort Monroe in Hampton

Location
- Country: United States
- State: Virginia
- Counties: York, City of Williamsburg, James City, City of Newport News, City of Hampton

Highway system
- Virginia Routes; Interstate; US; Primary; Secondary; Byways; History; HOT lanes
| ← SR 142 | → SR 144 |

State Route 143 (SR 143) is a primary state highway in the U.S. state of Virginia. The state highway runs 35.39 miles (56.95 km) from Camp Peary near Williamsburg east to U.S. Route 258 (US 258) at Fort Monroe in Hampton. SR 143 is a major local thoroughfare on the Virginia Peninsula portion of the Hampton Roads metropolitan area. The state highway is named Merrimac Trail through the independent city of Williamsburg and adjacent portions of York County and James City County. SR 143 follows Jefferson Avenue through the city of Newport News from the Williamsburg area past Virginia Peninsula Regional Jail to near Downtown Newport News. The state highway, which mostly runs northwest–southeast, heads northeast from Newport News, serving as one highway connecting the downtown areas of Newport News and Hampton. SR 143 parallels both US 60 and Interstate 64 (I-64) extensively, and sometimes very closely, throughout its course. The state highway also runs concurrently with US 60 in Hampton and with US 17 in Newport News.

== Route description ==
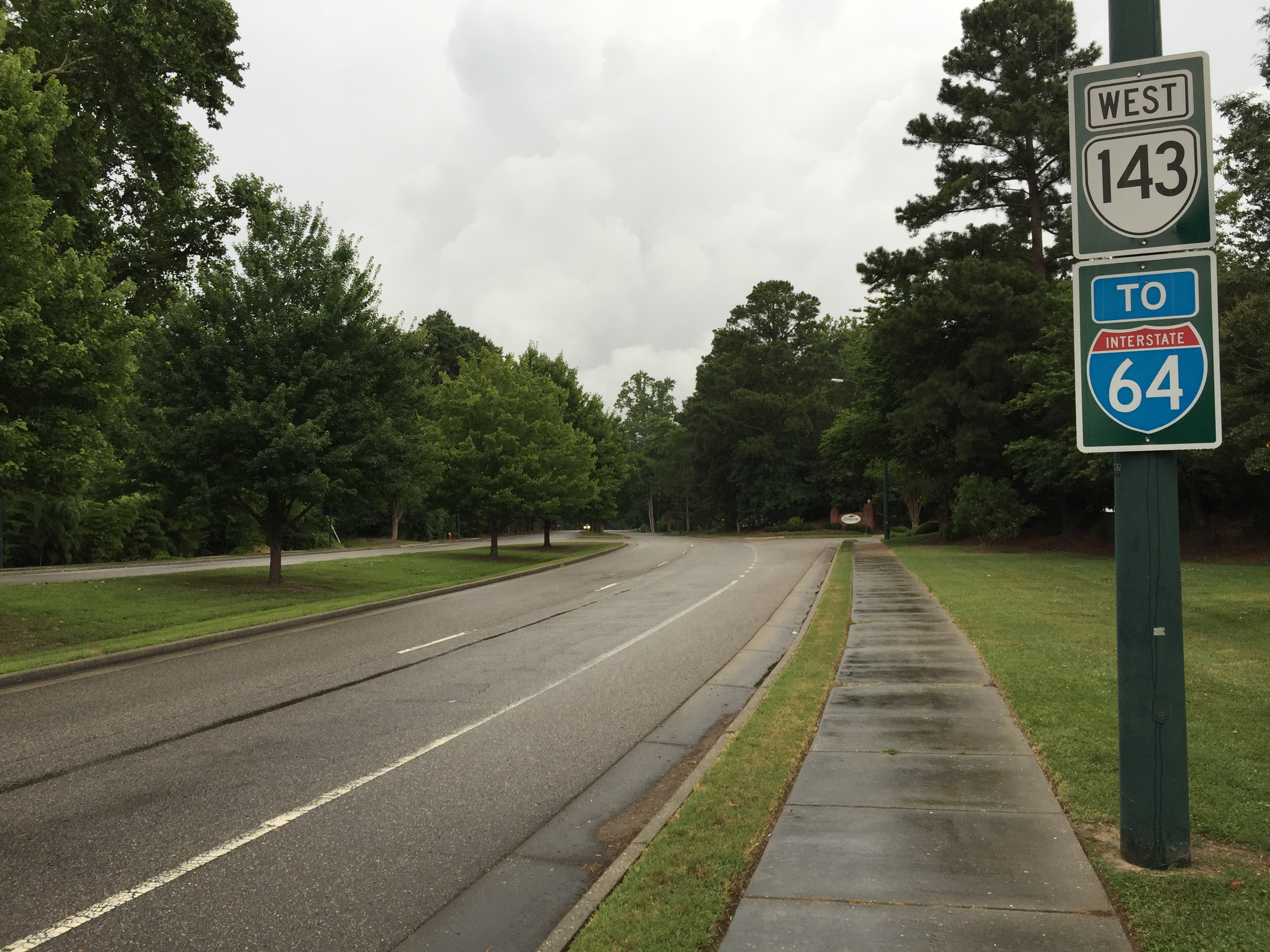
View west along SR 143 at SR 5 in Williamsburg

SR 143 begins at the entrance to Camp Peary in York County north of Williamsburg. The state highway heads south as Merrimac Trail, a four-lane divided highway that meets I-64 at a partial cloverleaf interchange. SR 143 heads south through a forested area and meets the northern end of SR 132, which provides access to Colonial Williamsburg and, via Colonial Parkway, Jamestown and Yorktown. The state highway crosses Queen Creek into the city of Williamsburg and meets the northern end of SR 5 (Capitol Landing Road). East of the SR 5 intersection, SR 143 reduces to a two-lane undivided road, crosses Colonial Parkway with no access, and re-enters York County by crossing an unnamed creek.

SR 143 becomes a five-lane road with a center left-turn lane at its intersection with SR 162 (2nd Street). The state highway heads southeast and enters James City County at its intersection with SR 641 (Penniman Road). SR 143 begins to closely parallel the north side of CSX's Peninsula Subdivision, which is itself paralleled by US 60 (Pocahontas Trail) to the south; the center left-turn lane becomes a left-turn lane exclusively for the eastbound direction of the highway. The two highways have mirror-image partial cloverleaf interchanges with SR 199 (Humelsine Parkway) as they re-enter York County. SR 143 passes between Williamsburg Country Club to the north and Busch Gardens Williamsburg to the south; the state highway does not have access to the theme park. Just east of the park, the westbound direction of the state highway receives an exit ramp from I-64.

SR 143 continues east into James City County as a four-lane undivided highway that closely parallels I-64 to the north and the railroad to the south while passing through a forested area. The state highway receives a ramp from eastbound I-64 shortly before crossing Mill Run into the city of Newport News, where the highway's name changes to Jefferson Avenue. Just east of the stream, there are ramps from eastbound SR 143 to eastbound I-64 and from westbound SR 143 to westbound I-64 as the state highway crosses to the north side of the Interstate. SR 143 intersects SR 238 (Yorktown Road), which provides access to and from I-64 in the direction of Hampton, near the Lee Hall area of the city. The state highway passes through Newport News Park and crosses the Lee Hall Reservoir before intersection SR 105 (Fort Eustis Boulevard) near Fort Eustis. The intersection is just east of SR 105's interchange with I-64; the ramps to and from westbound I-64 for access to SR 105 in the direction of Yorktown connect with SR 143 north and south of the interchange, respectively.

SR 143 veers away from I-64 and expands to a six-lane divided highway at Kings Ridge Drive. The state highway intersects SR 173 (Denbigh Boulevard) east of the namesake community and north of Newport News/Williamsburg International Airport, which is accessed by Bland Boulevard. Southeast of the airport, SR 143 crosses to the south side of I-64 at a cloverleaf interchange adjacent to Patrick Henry Mall. The state highway intersects SR 171 (Oyster Point Road) and passes through an industrial and commercial area that includes the Jefferson Lab (Thomas Jefferson National Accelerator Facility) and the City Center at Oyster Point. South of the city center, SR 143 intersects J. Clyde Morris Boulevard, which heads northeast as part of US 17 toward Yorktown and west as SR 312. SR 143 and US 17 run concurrently southeast through junctions with SR 306 (Harpersville Road) and SR 152 (Main Street) before diverging at Mercury Boulevard, a major east–west thoroughfare that carries US 258 and provides access to the James River Bridge. This intersection is also the northern terminus of SR 32.

SR 143 becomes a four-lane undivided highway at 40th Street, which is used to access SR 351 (39th Street). SR 351 passes over SR 143 just to the north of SR 143's partial interchange with I-664 (Hampton Roads Beltway), which includes ramps from eastbound SR 143 to southbound I-664 and from northbound I-664 to SR 143. The state highway becomes two lanes at 34th Street and maintains that profile southeast to 27th and 28th Streets, onto which the highway turns northeast as a one-way pair, with eastbound following 27th Street and westbound using 28th Street. This one-way pair is just north of US 60's one-way pair on 25th and 26th Streets. The one-way pair ends at Salters Creek, where the highway comes together as a four-lane divided highway passes through a sliver of the city of Hampton. SR 143 enters Hampton for good at Pear Avenue, where the highway continues as Victoria Boulevard.

SR 143 follows Victoria Boulevard through the Wythe and Kecoughtan neighborhoods of Hampton. Within the latter neighborhood, the state highway intersects US 60; the state highway joins the U.S. Highway north on Kecoughtan Road then east on Settlers Landing Road. The two highways meet the southern end of SR 134 (Armistead Avenue) and head as a two-lane divided street through downtown Hampton, which contains St. John's Episcopal Church and the Virginia Air and Space Center. SR 143 and US 60 become four lanes again to cross the Hampton River and pass along the northern edge of the campus of Hampton University. The two highways diverge at their diamond interchange with I-64 (Hampton Roads Beltway), which US 60 joins to cross Hampton Roads via the Hampton Roads Bridge-Tunnel to Norfolk. SR 143 continues southeast along two-lane County Street, turns southwest onto Libby Street for one block, then turns south on Mellen Street and intersects SR 169 (Mallory Street) within the Phoebus neighborhood. The state highway crosses the Mill Creek estuary as Ingalls Road and reaches its eastern terminus at its junction with US 258's (Mercury Boulevard) northern terminus at the entrance to Fort Monroe.

== Major intersections ==
| County | Location | mi | km | Destinations | Notes |
|---|---|---|---|---|---|
| York | | 0.00 | 0.00 | Camp Peary | Western terminus |
| York | | 0.24 | 0.39 | I-64 – Newport News, Richmond | Exit 238 (I-64) |
| York | | 0.84 | 1.35 | SR 132 south – Williamsburg, Jamestown, Yorktown via Colonial Parkway, Colonial Williamsburg Visitor Center | |
| City of Williamsburg | | 1.43 | 2.30 | SR 5 west (Capitol Landing Road) | Eastern terminus of SR 5 |
| York | | | | SR 162 west (Second Street) – Williamsburg, Colonial Parkway, Colonial Williamsburg Visitor Center | Eastern terminus of SR 162 |
| James City | No major junctions | | | | |
| York | | 4.21 | 6.78 | SR 199 to US 60 / I-64 – Newport News, Richmond, Yorktown, Jamestown, Busch Gardens, Downtown Williamsburg, Water Country USA, Colonial Parkway, Cheatham Annex | interchange |
| York | | | | I-64 | Exit 243B (I-64), access from I-64 to SR 143 westbound only |
| James City | No major junctions | | | | |
| City of Newport News | | | | I-64 – Williamsburg, Richmond, Newport News, Hampton | Exit 247 (I-64); ramps from eastbound I-64 to SR 143, eastbound SR 143 to eastbound I-64, and westbound SR 143 to westbound I-64 |
| City of Newport News | | 10.27 | 16.53 | SR 238 (Yorktown Road) to I-64 east – Lee Hall | |
| City of Newport News | | 12.82 | 20.63 | SR 105 (Fort Eustis Boulevard) / I-64 to US 17 – Williamsburg, Yorktown, Fort Eustis, Fort Eustis Transportation Museum | Exit 250 (I-64); direct ramps between westbound I-64 and SR 143 |
| City of Newport News | | 15.85 | 25.51 | SR 173 (Denbigh Boulevard) | |
| City of Newport News | | 17.84 | 28.71 | I-64 – Hampton, Norfolk, Williamsburg, Richmond | Exit 255 (I-64) |
| City of Newport News | | 18.57 | 29.89 | SR 171 east (Oyster Point Road) to I-64 | Western terminus of SR 171 |
| City of Newport News | | 20.97 | 33.75 | US 17 north / SR 312 west (J. Clyde Morris Boulevard) to I-64 – Yorktown | West end of concurrency with US 17; eastern terminus of SR 312 |
| City of Newport News | | 22.09 | 35.55 | Harpersville Road (SR 306 west) | Eastern terminus of SR 306 |
| City of Newport News | | 23.78 | 38.27 | SR 152 (Main Street) – Thomas Nelson Community College | |
| City of Newport News | | 25.09 | 40.38 | US 17 south / US 258 (Mercury Boulevard / SR 32 south) to I-64 – Hampton, Norfolk, James River Bridge, Downtown Newport News, Portsmouth | East end of concurrency with US 17; northern terminus of SR 32 |
| City of Newport News | | | | 40th Street to SR 351 / I-664 north | interchange |
| City of Newport News | | 27.59 | 44.40 | I-664 south / 35th Street – Suffolk | Exit 5 (I-664); ramps from eastbound SR 143 to southbound I-664 and from northbound I-664 to SR 143 |
| City of Newport News | | | | Jefferson Avenue / 28th Street to I-664 – Downtown Newport News, Newport News Marine Terminal | former SR 167 north |
| City of Hampton | | | | LaSalle Avenue to I-64 | former SR 167 |
| City of Hampton | | 32.59 | 52.45 | US 60 west (Kecoughtan Road) | West end of concurrency with US 60 |
| City of Hampton | | 32.98 | 53.08 | SR 134 north (Armistead Avenue) | Southern terminus of SR 134 |
| City of Hampton | | 34.11 | 54.89 | I-64 / US 60 east – Williamsburg, Richmond, Norfolk, Virginia Beach | Exit 267 (I-64); east end of concurrency with US 60 |
| City of Hampton | | | | SR 143 Truck east (Woodland Road) to US 258 | |
| City of Hampton | | 34.70 | 55.84 | SR 169 (South Mallory Street) to I-64 | |
| City of Hampton | | 35.39 | 56.95 | US 258 south / SR 143 Truck west (East Mercury Boulevard) | Eastern terminus; northern terminus of US 258 |
1.000 mi = 1.609 km; 1.000 km = 0.621 mi: Concurrency terminus; Incomplete access

| < SR 528 | District 5 State Routes; 1928–1933 | SR 530 > |
| < SR 531 | District 5 State Routes; 1928–1933 | SR 533 > |
