= Grafton, Virginia =

Unincorporated community in Virginia, US

Coordinates: 37°9′55.5″N 76°28′6.8″W

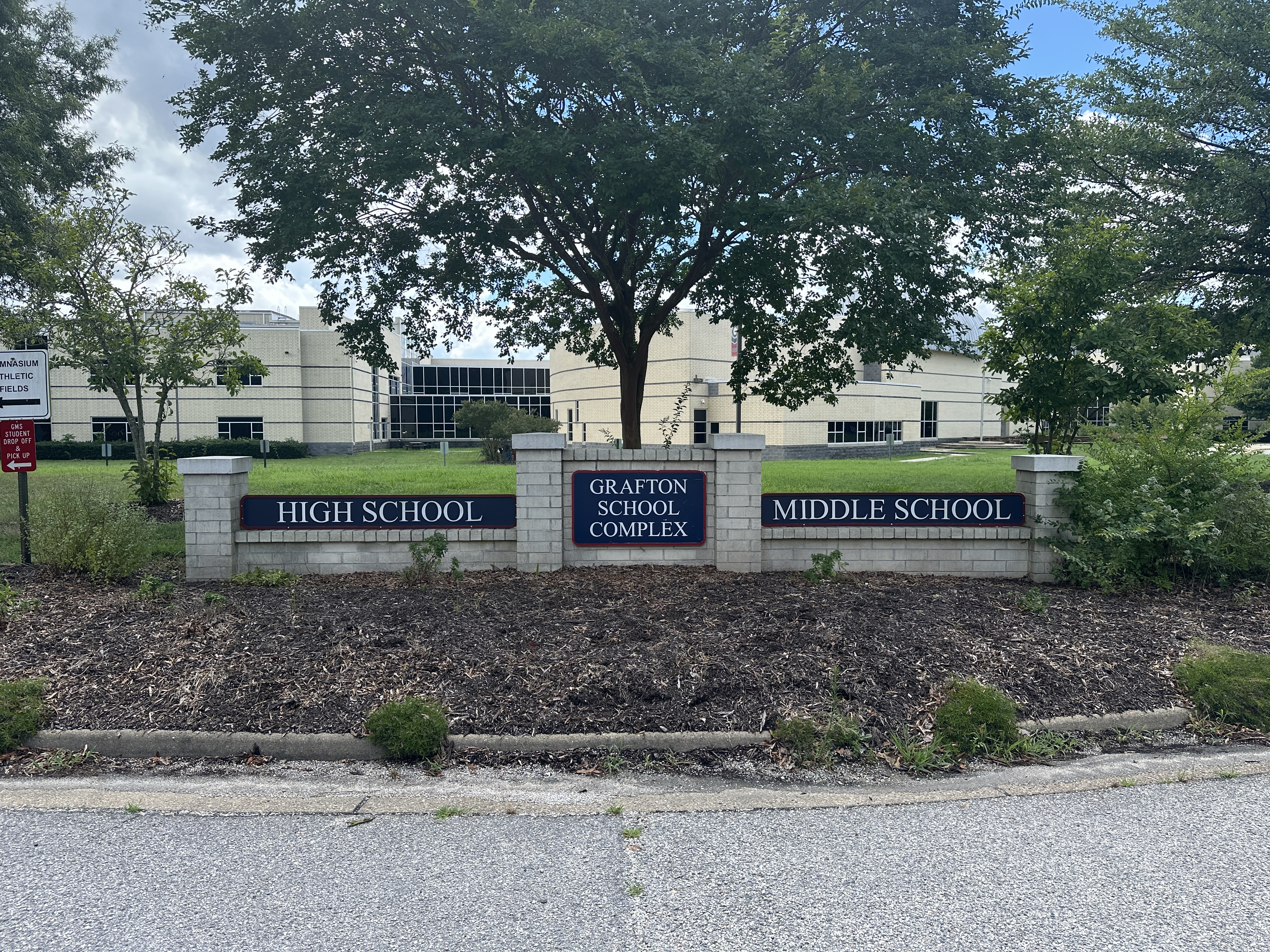
Grafton high and middle school

Grafton is an unincorporated community in York County, Virginia, United States, on the Virginia Peninsula. As of the 2010 Census, the Grafton postal area (ZIP Code 23692) had a population of 18,846.

== History ==
Originally known as Cockletown, the area became known as Grafton due to a church in that area. That church was established by a pastor from Grafton, Massachusetts, John Leland, who put forth his hometown's name for consideration; the name was adopted in 1783 by the church. The entire town would be known by that name by 1872 when the post office there was established.
