= National Register of Historic Places listings in New Kent County, Virginia =

Location of New Kent County in Virginia

This is a list of the National Register of Historic Places listings in New Kent County, Virginia.

This is intended to be a complete list of the properties and districts on the National Register of Historic Places in New Kent County, Virginia, United States. The locations of National Register properties and districts for which the latitude and longitude coordinates are included below, may be seen in an online map.

There are 18 properties and districts listed on the National Register in the county, including 2 National Historic Landmarks.

This National Park Service list is complete through NPS recent listings posted March 6, 2026.

== Current listings ==
	Name on the Register	Image	Date listed	Location	City or town	Description
1	Cedar Grove	Cedar Grove	December 28, 1979 (#79003058)	Northwest of Providence Forge on Emmaus Church Rd. 37°29′06″N 77°06′55″W	Providence Forge	
2	Cedar Lane	Cedar Lane	May 8, 2017 (#100000985)	9040 State Route 249; 37°31′47″N 77°02′32″W	New Kent	
3	Criss Cross	Criss Cross	May 11, 1973 (#73002043)	Southwest of New Kent off Criss Cross Rd. 37°30′10″N 77°01′47″W	New Kent	
4	Crump's Mill and Millpond	Crump's Mill and Millpond	September 24, 1999 (#99001199)	9065 Crump's Mill Rd. 37°32′24″N 77°05′22″W	Quinton	
5	Cumberland	Cumberland	May 8, 2017 (#100000986)	9007 Cumberland Rd. 37°32′23″N 76°58′39″W	New Kent	
6	Emmaus Baptist Church	Emmaus Baptist Church	June 10, 1993 (#93000506)	Western side of State Route 106, 0.4 miles (0.64 km) south of Interstate 64; 37°29′57″N 77°05′32″W	Providence Forge	
7	Foster's Castle	Foster's Castle	April 11, 1973 (#73002044)	Northeast of Tunstall off Old River Rd. 37°35′38″N 77°04′34″W	Tunstall	
8	Hampstead	Hampstead	December 18, 1970 (#70000812)	1 mile (1.6 km) northwest of the junction of Old Church and Steel Trap Rds. 37°36′25″N 77°07′43″W	Tunstall	
9	Marl Hill	Marl Hill	December 21, 1990 (#90001832)	St. Peters Ln., east of its junction with Old Church Rd. 37°32′23″N 77°03′03″W	Talleysville	
10	Moss Side	Moss Side	June 5, 2017 (#100001046)	8501 State Route 249; 37°31′22″N 77°03′17″W	New Kent	
11	Moysonec	Moysonec	June 20, 1975 (#75002026)	Address Restricted	Toano	
12	New Kent Ordinary	New Kent Ordinary	December 9, 2019 (#100004747)	12000 State Route 249; 37°31′05″N 76°58′43″W	New Kent Court	
13	New Kent School; George W. Watkins School	New Kent School; George W. Watkins School	August 7, 2001 (#01001046)	11825 State Route 249 (New Kent) and 6501 State Route 249 (Watkins); 37°31′46″N 77°05′54″W	New Kent and Quinton	Pair of schools that represent widespread token desegregation of southern schools in the decade after the 1954 Brown v. Board of Education U.S. Supreme Court decision. Focus of 1968 Green v. County School Board, which was effective in bringing about real desegregation.
14	Olivet Presbyterian Church	Olivet Presbyterian Church	January 26, 1978 (#78003034)	2.7 miles (4.3 km) northwest of Providence Forge on Olivet Church Rd. 37°28′49″N 77°03′48″W	Providence Forge	
15	Shuttlewood		August 16, 2022 (#100008021)	8830 Saint Peters Ln. 37°32′30″N 77°02′31″W	New Kent vicinity	
16	South Garden	South Garden	November 10, 2022 (#100008391)	6331 Pocahontas Trail; 37°27′44″N 77°06′08″W	Providence Forge	
17	Spring Hill	Spring Hill	November 27, 2002 (#02001448)	11221 Carriage Rd. 37°26′05″N 76°59′44″W	Providence Forge	
18	St. Peter's Church	St. Peter's Church	October 1, 1969 (#69000263)	St. Peters Ln. 37°32′26″N 77°03′23″W	New Kent	designated a National Historic Landmark March 2, 2012 (as St. Peter's Parish Church)

== See also ==
- List of National Historic Landmarks in Virginia
- National Register of Historic Places listings in Virginia
