= George W. Watkins Elementary School =

Historic school in Virginia, US

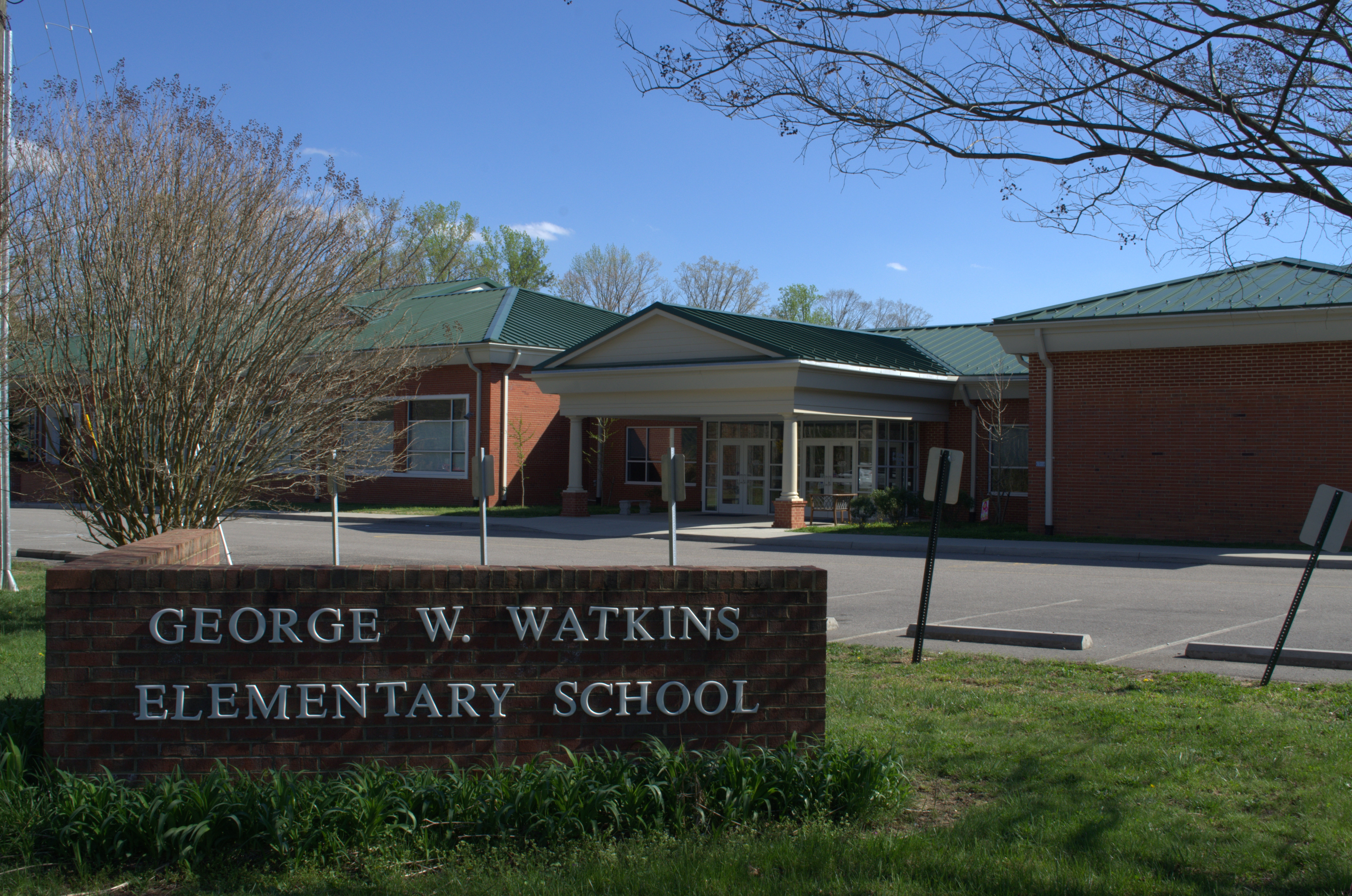

Location
- 6501 New Kent Highway; Quinton, Virginia 23141; United States; 37.5293°N 77.0983°W

Information
- School type: Public elementary school
- School district: New Kent County School Division
- Superintendent: Dr. David Myers
- Principal: Russell A. Macomber
- Grades: K–5
- Language: English
- Website: Official Site
- New Kent School; George W. Watkins School
- U.S. National Register of Historic Places
- U.S. National Historic Landmark
- Virginia Landmarks Register
- Area: 10 acres (4.0 ha)
- Built: 1950; 1960
- NRHP reference No.: 01001046
- VLR No.: 063-5011

Significant dates
- Added to NRHP: August 7, 2001
- Designated NHL: August 7, 2001
- Designated VLR: June 13, 2001

George W. Watkins Elementary School is an elementary school located in Quinton, Virginia, and is one of four such schools in New Kent County. As a formerly African American-only high school, it, along with the nearby New Kent High School is a National Historic Landmark and is associated with the Supreme Court case Green v. County School Board of New Kent County. Like the other public schools in New Kent, Watkins is located on Route 249 (New Kent Highway), though it is about seven miles west of the others.

== Integration and Green v. County School Board of New Kent County ==
Before desegregation, George Watkins was the county's African American-only high school, while New Kent High School in nearby New Kent was the high school for whites. The name for the former was in honor of Dr. George W. Watkins, who served as the pastor of the Second Liberty Baptist Church from 1928 to 1971. During this time, he encouraged church members to take leadership roles in the community, such as on the local school board, planning commission, board of supervisors, and other civic and religious organizations. The most notable of those who followed this advice was Dr. Calvin C. Green, who led the push for desegregation in Green v. County School Board.

In 1954, the Brown v. Board of Education decision overturned the "separate but equal" doctrine, but it was not specific on remedies that educational systems had to take to remove discrimination. The 1955 "Brown II" ruling on relief called only for desegregation at "all deliberate speed", which many interpreted to allow active resistance. Many school systems made changes which allowed them to avoid the most blatant appearance of discrimination, but which achieved only token amounts of integration. Notably, the 1955 Briggs appeals court decision was one that held that the constitution "'does not require integration. It merely forbids discrimination.'", and this was used to avoid taking active steps towards integration.

In reaction to the Brown v. Board decision, the New Kent County School System implemented a choice system in 1967, through which students were given a choice to either attend New Kent High School or George Watkins High School. The plan resulted in some African Americans attending New Kent but no whites attending Watkins. In Green v. County School Board of New Kent County, the Supreme Court ruled that the choice plan was unconstitutional. Watkins was soon converted into a middle school and an integrated New Kent High School became the county school for grades 9-12.

== Modern use ==
The building has served as an elementary school for some time, but was known as "New Kent Elementary School." The recent name change was meant to both honor the contributions of Dr. George W. Watkins and acknowledge the role the school played in the era of desegregation. The school has also recently switched from teaching only grades 3-5 to teaching K-5. This was achieved after significant renovation and expansion, and after the former "New Kent Primary School" (K-2) was renamed "New Kent Elementary School" and began to share the load of K-5 students.

== See also ==
- National Register of Historic Places listings in New Kent County, Virginia
- List of National Historic Landmarks in Virginia
