= Moss Side (New Kent County, Virginia) =

Historic house in Virginia, United States

- U.S. National Register of Historic Places
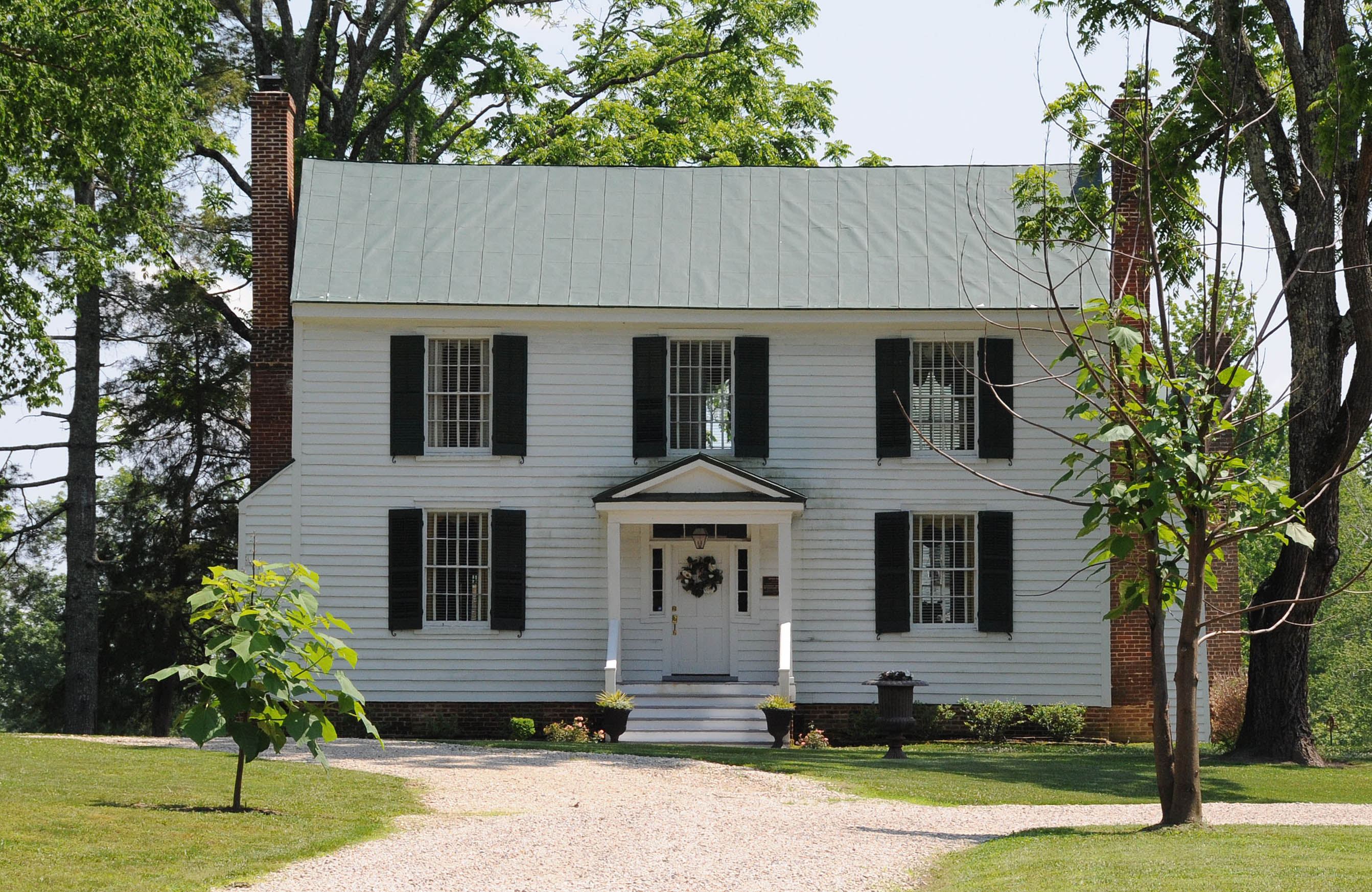

- Location within Virginia Location within the United States
- Location: 8501 State Route 249, vicinity of New Kent, Virginia
- Coordinates: 37°31′22″N 77°3′17″W
- Area: 226 acres (91 ha)
- Built: ca. 1870
- Architectural style: I-house
- NRHP reference No.: 100001046
- Added to NRHP: May 8, 2017

Moss Side is a historic farm property at 8501 Virginia State Route 249 in central New Kent County, Virginia. It now consists of about 226 acres (91 ha), whose centerpiece is a two-story wood-frame I-house built about 1870. Although this type of house was once quite common, it is a well-preserved example of the style, and is accompanied by a period outbuilding that probably functioned as either a guest house, kitchen, or tenant housing. Although the property's early history is dominated by the Christian family, these buildings date to the late 19th-century ownership by Henry Meyers, who gave the property its name.

The property was listed on the National Register of Historic Places in 2017.

== See also ==
- National Register of Historic Places listings in New Kent County, Virginia
