= Cedar Lane =

Cedar Lane may refer to:

- Cedar Lane (album), a 1997 studio album by Mindy Jostyn
- Cedar Lane, Texas, an unincorporated community in Matagorda County
- Cedar Lane (Leggett, North Carolina) or Fountain House, a historic plantation house
- Cedar Lane (New Kent, Virginia), a historic farm property
- Cedar Lane Farm or Dr. Isham G. Bailey House, a historic cottage in Lamar, Mississippi
- Cedar Lane Unitarian Universalist Congregation, a church in Bethesda, Maryland
