= Cedar Lane (New Kent, Virginia) =

Historic house in Virginia, United States

- U.S. National Register of Historic Places
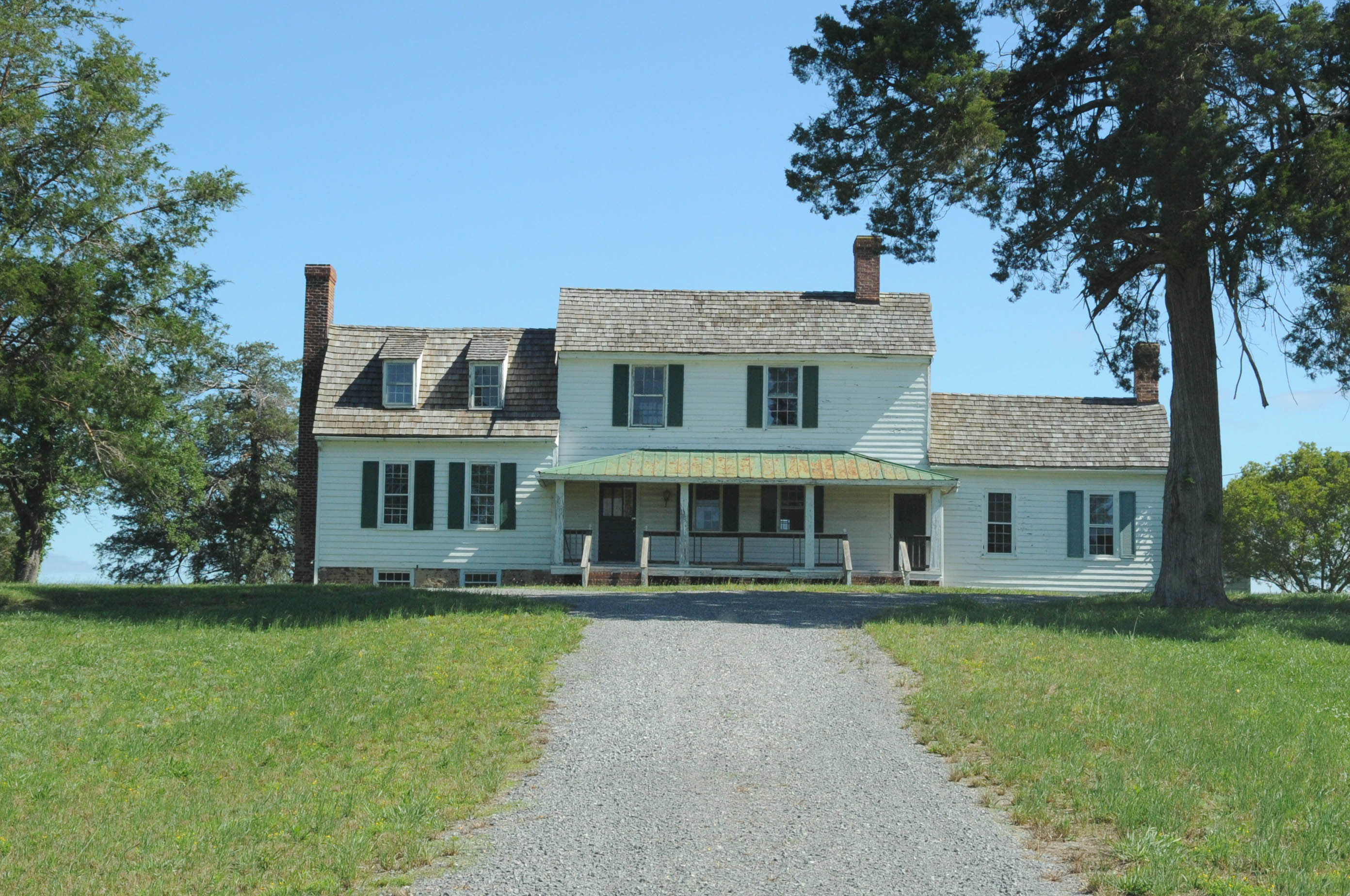

- Location within Virginia Location within the United States
- Location: 9040 State Route 249, New Kent, Virginia
- Coordinates: 37°31′47″N 77°2′32″W
- Area: 181 acres (73 ha)
- Built: ca. 1782
- Architectural style: Federal
- NRHP reference No.: 100000985
- Added to NRHP: May 8, 2017

Cedar Lane is a historic farm property at 9040 Virginia State Route 249 in central New Kent County, Virginia. Built about 1782, it is one of the county's better examples of early Federal period architecture. It is a two-story frame structure, with a gabled roof and clapboarded exterior. An open hip-roofed porch extends across the front of the main block, which is flanked by two-story and one-story wings. It was probably built by either William Poindexter or by his daughter Ann and her husband Thomas Howle, and achieved much of its present form by 1860.

The property was listed on the National Register of Historic Places in 2017.

== See also ==
- National Register of Historic Places listings in New Kent County, Virginia
