= Providence, Virginia =

Providence may refer to:

- Providence, Fairfax County, Virginia, now Fairfax
- Providence, Grayson County, Virginia
- Providence, Halifax County, Virginia
- Providence Church, Virginia, in Suffolk
- Providence Forge, Virginia, in New Kent County
- Providence Junction, Virginia, in Chesapeake
