= Tunstall, Virginia =

Unincorporated community in Virginia, United States

- Unincorporated community
- Location within Virginia Location within the United States
- Coordinates: 37°35′47″N 77°06′09″W
- Country: United States
- State: Virginia
- County: New Kent
- Elevation: 49 ft (15 m)
- Time zone: UTC−5 (Eastern (EST))
  - Summer (DST): UTC−4 (EDT)
- Area code: 804
- GNIS feature ID: 1500242

Tunstall is an unincorporated community in New Kent County, Virginia, United States.

Foster's Castle and Hampstead, both located in Tunstall, are listed on the National Register of Historic Places.
