= Olivet Presbyterian Church =

Historic church in Virginia, United States

- U.S. National Register of Historic Places
- Virginia Landmarks Register
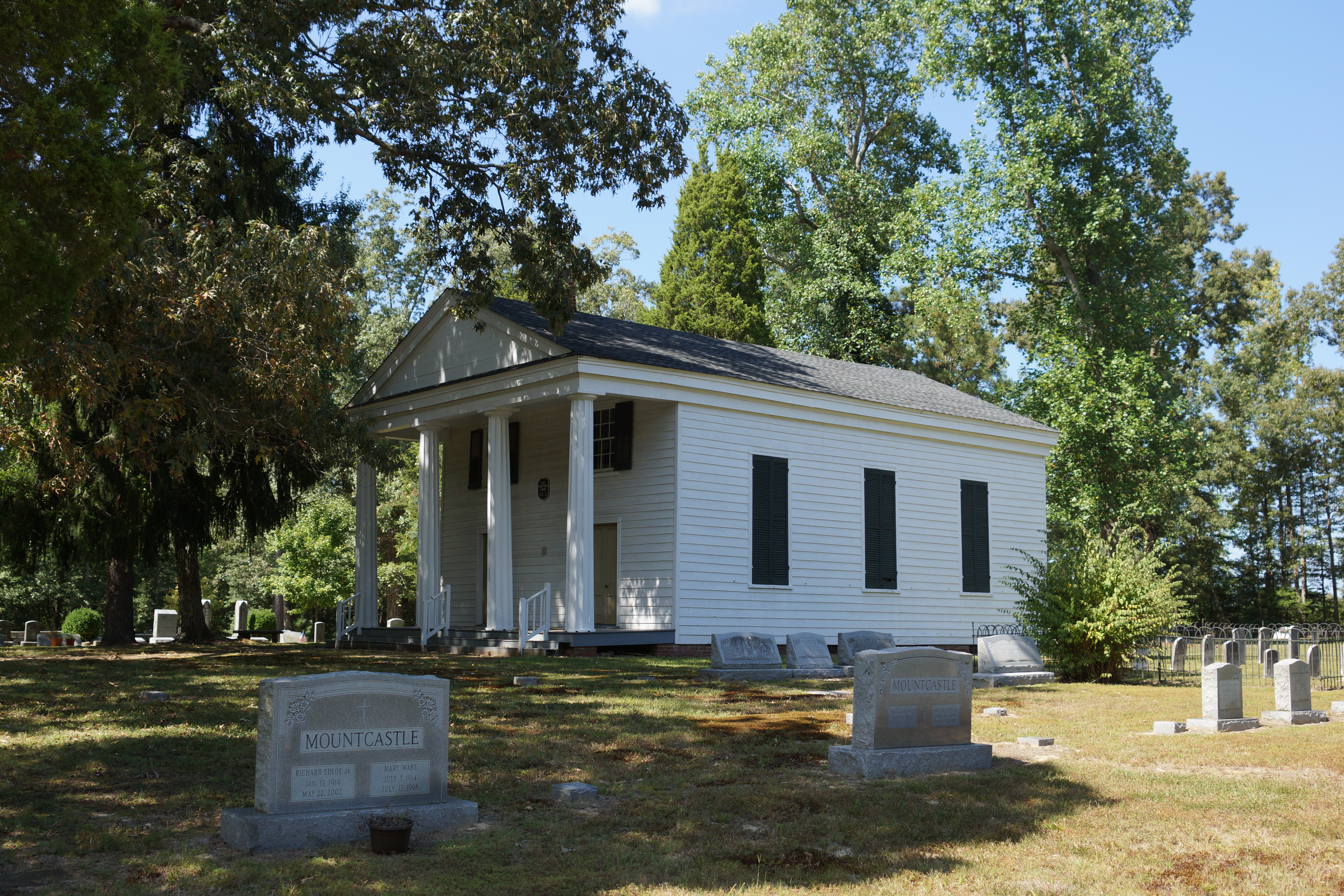

- Location within Virginia Location within the United States
- Location: 2.7 miles (4.3 km) northwest of Providence Forge on VA 618, near Providence Forge, Virginia
- Coordinates: 37°28′48″N 77°3′50″W
- Area: 1 acre (0.40 ha)
- Built: 1856
- Architectural style: Greek Revival
- NRHP reference No.: 78003034
- VLR No.: 063-0105

Significant dates
- Added to NRHP: January 26, 1978
- Designated VLR: July 19, 1977

Olivet Presbyterian Church is a historic Presbyterian church located near Providence Forge, New Kent County, Virginia. It was built in 1856, and is a small frame church building in the Greek Revival style. It features a flush-boarded, pedimented portico with four fluted Greek Doric order columns.

It was listed on the National Register of Historic Places in 1978.
