= Jarell Christian =

American basketball player and coach

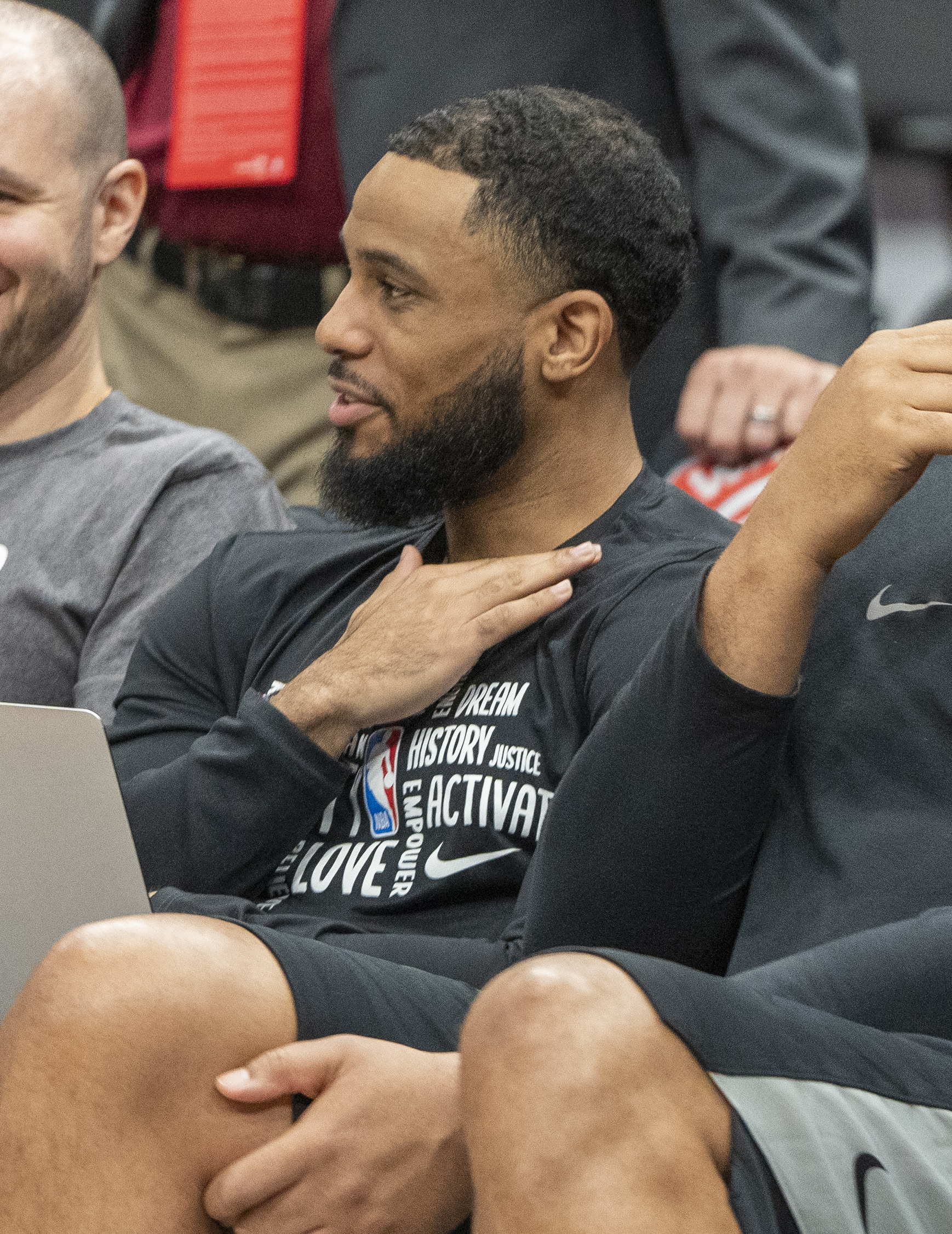
- Christian in 2020

Seattle Storm
- Title: Assistant coach
- League: WNBA

Personal information
- Born: July 19, 1986 (age 40) Quinton, Virginia, U.S.
- Listed height: 6 ft 1 in (1.85 m)
- Listed weight: 185 lb (84 kg)

Career information
- High school: New Kent (New Kent, Virginia)
- College: Emory & Henry
- Position: Guard
- Number: 30
- Coaching career: 2009–present

Career history

Coaching
- 2009–2010: Tusculum College (assistant)
- 2010–2012: Emory & Henry (assistant)
- 2012–2014: Randolph–Macon (assistant)
- 2014–2018: Oklahoma City Blue (assistant)
- 2018–2019: Capital City Go-Go
- 2019–2021: Washington Wizards (assistant)
- 2021–2022: Maine Celtics
- 2022–2025: Maine Celtics (GM)
- 2025–present: Seattle Storm (assistant)

Jarell Christian (born July 19, 1986) is an American former professional basketball player who currently serves as an assistant coach for the Seattle Storm of the Women's National Basketball Association (WNBA).

== Early life ==
Christian is a former all-state track performer at New Kent High School, where he set state records in the 200M, 400M, and 4x100 relay.

Christian graduated from E&H in 2009 with a degree in sports management after playing four years of basketball for the Wasps. During his senior year, he served as the high jump and sprint coach for the Patrick Henry High School track team. Christian helped guide that team to a District and Region Championship and coached seven All-State performers and two State Champions.

Born and raised in Quinton, Virginia he attended New Kent High School. Christian's father, John, was a standout track athlete at Virginia State University. His father, John Christian Jr., was a sprinter who was a member of the 1980 Olympic track team which boycotted the Olympics. The elder Christian is in the Virginia State University Hall of Fame and is a retired Head Coach of the Charles City County High School Track & Field team. His mother was a teacher at New Kent Middle School (formerly New Kent High School). His brother Jamion Christian spent three years as the head coach of the Men's Basketball team at George Washington University.

== Career ==
Previously, Christian served as an assistant coach for the Oklahoma City Blues. He was hired by the Wizards in 2018 as head coach of their development team, the Capital City Go-Go, before being promoted to the Wizards' staff in 2019.

During the 2021–22 season, Christian was the head coach of the Maine Celtics in the NBA G League. He played college basketball at Emory & Henry College.

In October 2022, Christian was promoted to serve as the general manager with for Maine. During the 2022–2023 season, Christian served in a hybrid role as both Maine's GM and Player Development Coach as a member of the Boston Celtics' coaching staff.

On December 18, 2025, Christian was hired to serve as an assistant coach for the Seattle Storm of the Women's National Basketball Association.
