= Crump's Mill and Millpond =

- U.S. National Register of Historic Places
- Virginia Landmarks Register
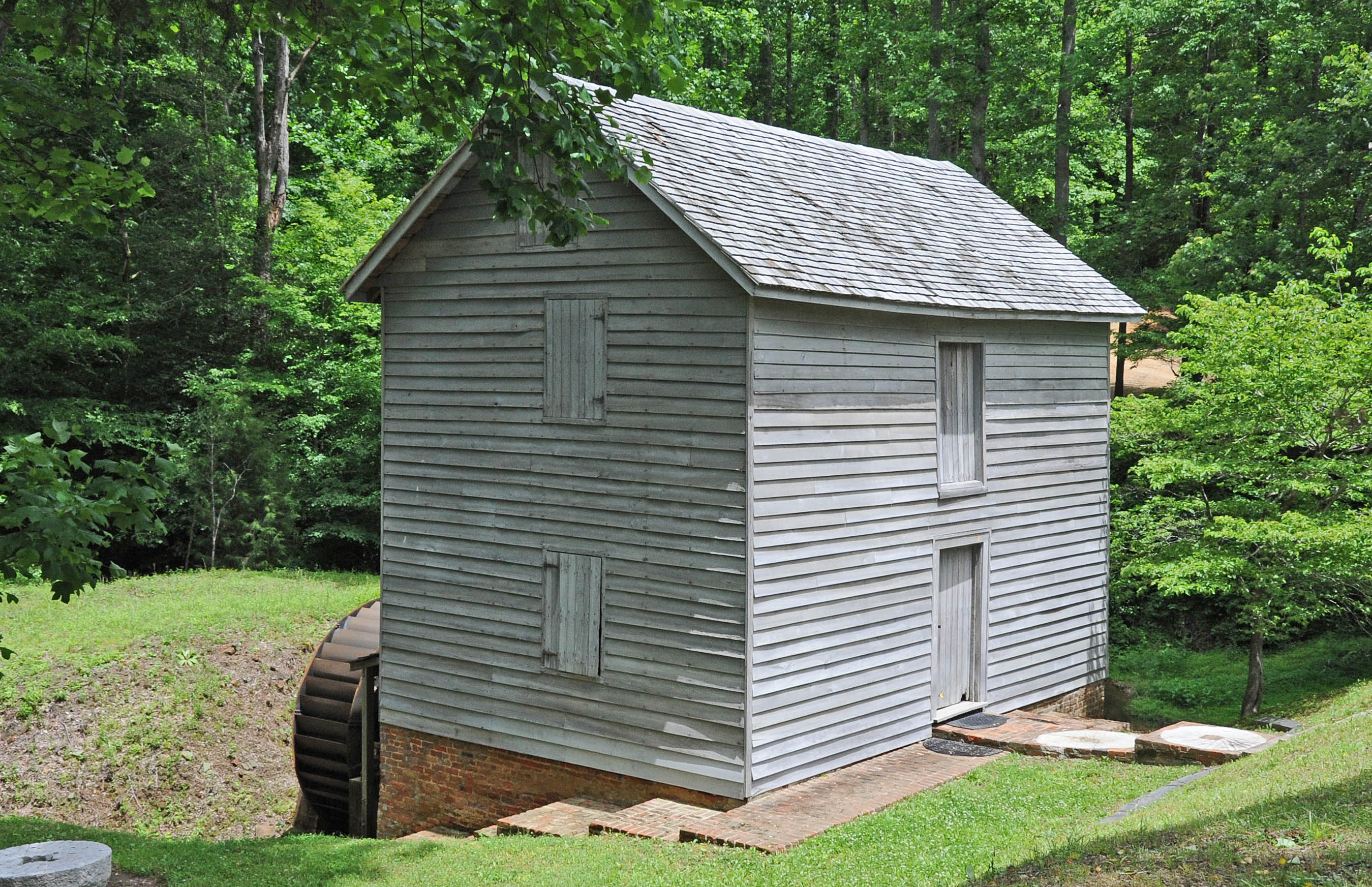
- in 2017

- Location within Virginia Location within the United States
- Location: 9065 Crump's Mill Rd., near Quinton, Virginia, U.S.
- Coordinates: 37°32′16″N 77°05′24″W
- Area: 17.7 acres (7.2 ha)
- Architectural style: Grist mill
- NRHP reference No.: 99001199
- VLR No.: 063-0070

Significant dates
- Added to NRHP: September 24, 1999
- Designated VLR: June 16, 1999

Crump's Mill and Millpond is a historic grist mill and mill pond located near Talleysville, New Kent County, Virginia. The mill is dated to the 1870s, and is a simple rectangular two-story frame structure with a gable roof. Much of the mill machinery survives at Crump's Mill. It replaced a mill built before 1818 and destroyed by fire in 1872, and remained in operation until 1955. The damming of South Branch in the early-19th century created a large millpond in the shape of the letter "L." The mill sits behind the dam that creates the 16-acre millpond. The mill and millpond are both located on private property.

It was listed on the National Register of Historic Places in 1999.
