= Foster's Castle =

Historic house in Virginia, United States

- U.S. National Register of Historic Places
- Virginia Landmarks Register
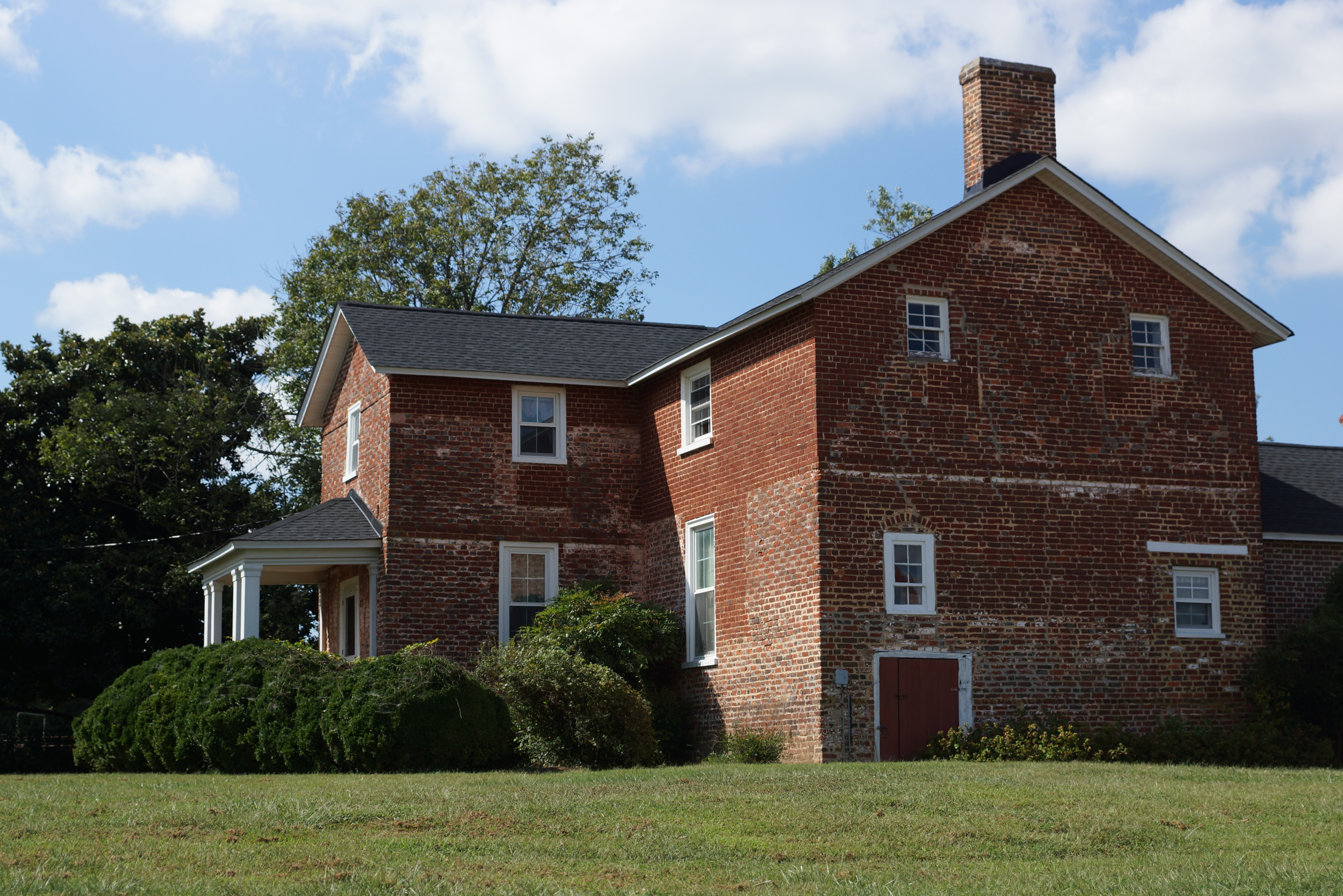

- Location within Virginia Location within the United States
- Location: Northeast of Tunstall off VA 608, near Tunstall, Virginia
- Coordinates: 37°35′20″N 77°04′42″W
- Area: 340 acres (140 ha)
- Built: c. 1685, 1873
- Architectural style: Colonial, Tudor-Stuart
- NRHP reference No.: 73002044
- VLR No.: 063-0003

Significant dates
- Added to NRHP: April 11, 1973
- Designated VLR: January 16, 1973

Foster's Castle is a historic plantation house located near Tunstall, New Kent County, Virginia. It was built about 1685, as a 1 1/2-story, T-shaped brick building, with a two-story central projection at the front. The house is similar to neighboring Criss Cross. It was raised to a full two stories with a low pitched roof in 1873. Its builder, Colonel Joseph Foster, was a vestryman and supervisor of construction at St. Peter's Church.

It was listed on the National Register of Historic Places in 1973.

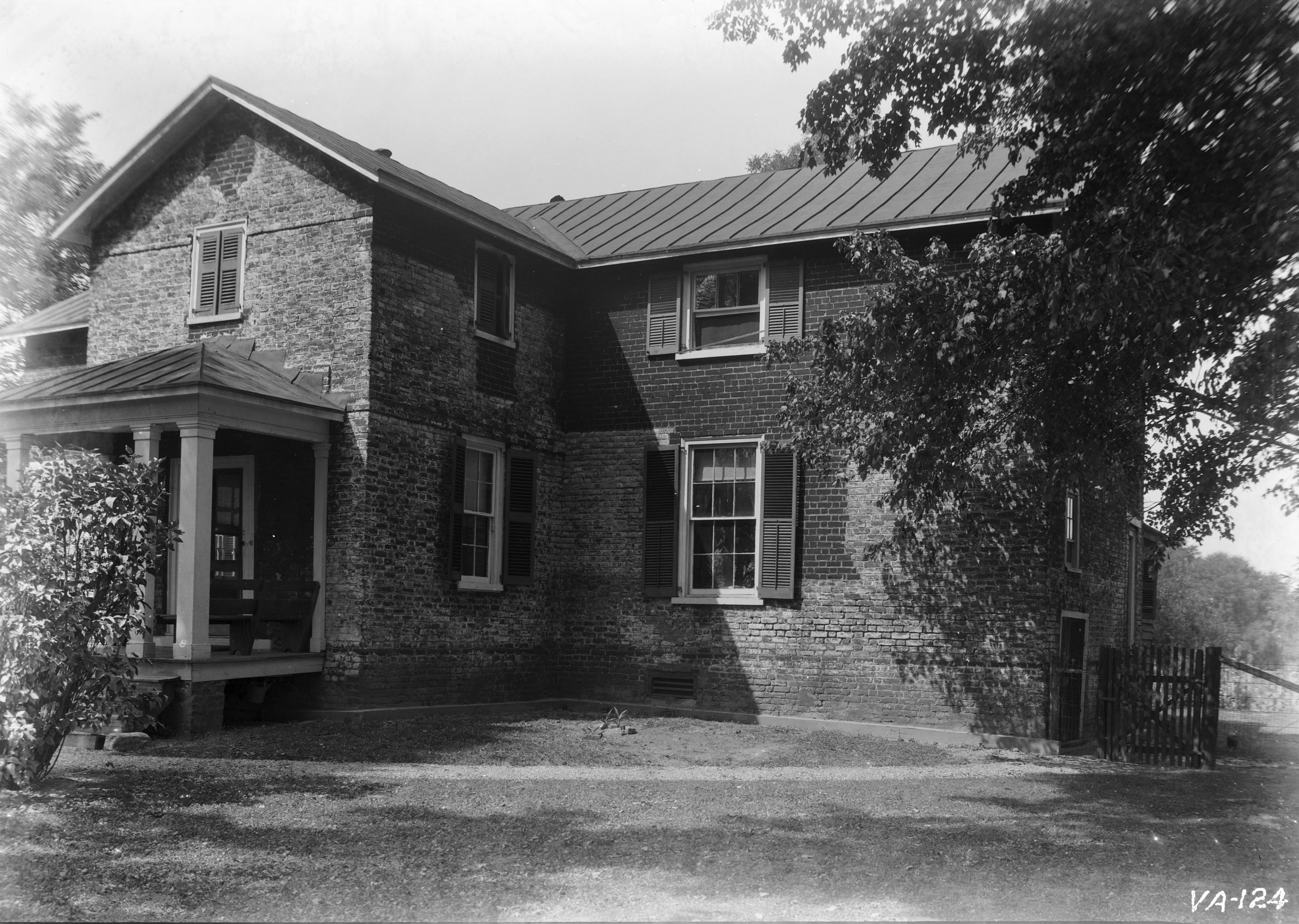
Fosters Castle, HABS Photo
