= Criss Cross (New Kent, Virginia) =

Historic house in Virginia, United States

- U.S. National Register of Historic Places
- Virginia Landmarks Register
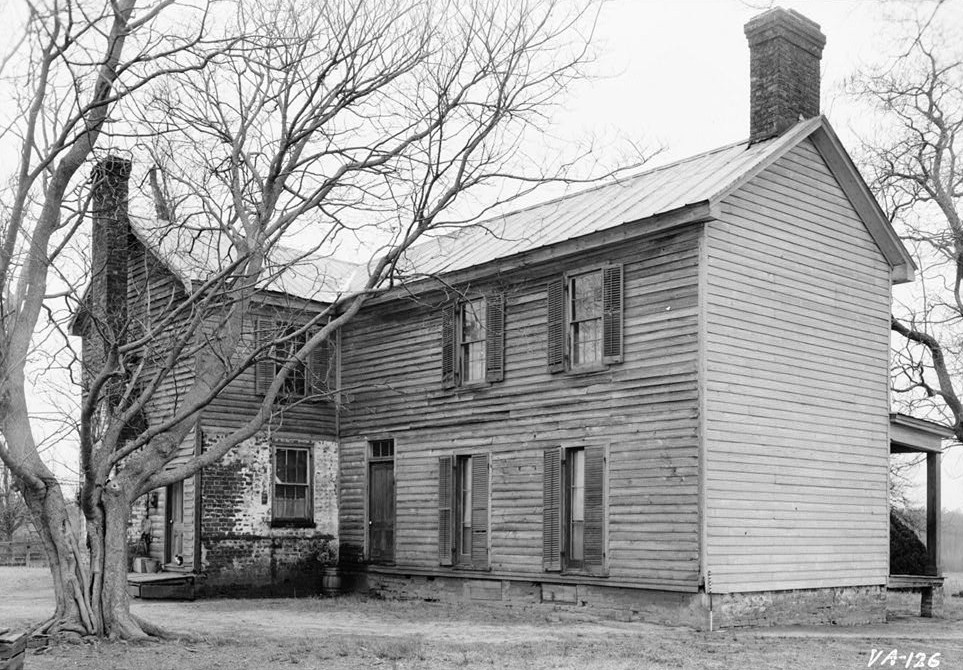
- Criss Cross

- Location within Virginia Location within the United States
- Location: Southwest of New Kent off VA 608, New Kent, Virginia
- Coordinates: 37°30′10″N 77°1′38″W
- Built: c. 1690
- Architectural style: Colonial
- NRHP reference No.: 73002043
- VLR No.: 063-0006

Significant dates
- Added to NRHP: May 11, 1973
- Designated VLR: January 16, 1973

Criss Cross is a Colonial style brick house built about 1690 by George Poindexter in New Kent County, Virginia. It is similar in style to neighboring Foster's Castle. George Poindexter was the immigrant founder of the Poindexters in America. Originally from Jersey, he settled his family in the Virginia Colony.

It was listed on the National Register of Historic Places in 1973.
