= Green v. County School Board of New Kent County =

Green v. County School Board of New Kent Co.
- Supreme Court of the United States

Argued April 3, 1968 Decided May 27, 1968
- Full case name: Charles C. Green et al. v. County School Board of New Kent County, Virginia et al.
- Citations: 391 U.S. 430 (more) 88 S. Ct. 1689; 20 L. Ed. 2d 716

Case history
- Prior: 382 F.2d 338 (4th Cir. 1967), cert. granted, 389 U.S. 1003.

Holding
- New Kent County's freedom of choice desegregation plan did not comply with the dictates of Brown v. Board of Education and was therefore unconstitutional.

Court membership
- Chief Justice Earl Warren Associate Justices Hugo Black · William O. Douglas; John M. Harlan II · William J. Brennan Jr. Potter Stewart · Byron White; Abe Fortas · Thurgood Marshall

Case opinion
- Majority: Brennan, joined by unanimous

Laws applied
- U.S. Const., amend. XIV

Green v. County School Board of New Kent County, 391 U.S. 430 (1968), was a landmark United States Supreme Court case involving school desegregation. Specifically, the Court dealt with the freedom of choice plans created to avoid compliance with the Supreme Court's mandate in Brown II in 1955. The Court held unanimously that New Kent County's freedom of choice plan did not adequately comply with the school board's responsibility to determine a system of admission to public schools on a non-racial basis. The Supreme Court mandated that the school board must formulate new plans and steps towards realistically converting to a desegregated system. Green v. County School Board of New Kent County was a follow-up of Brown v. Board of Education.

Green established what came to be known as the five Green factors — faculty, staff, transportation, extracurricular activities and facilities — the criteria by which later courts would evaluate school districts' progress on desegregation.

== Background ==
=== School segregation in the Jim Crow era ===
Brown v. Board of Education is a landmark desegregation ruling, but difficult to implement, and limited to state-sanctioned segregation of public schools. One year later, in Brown II, enforcement of this principle was given to district courts, ordering that they take the necessary steps to make admittance to public schools nondiscriminatory "with all deliberate speed." The term "all deliberate speed" did little to speed up the school board's plan for integration. Judge John J. Parker of the United States Court of Appeals for the 4th Circuit led many in the South in interpreting Brown as a charge not to segregate, but not as an order to integrate.

The Supreme Court heard several more cases surrounding the speed and efficacy of desegregation between its initial ruling in Brown and the Green v. School Board case in 1968.

==== Virginia ====
Virginia had long mandated racial segregation in public education under the Virginia Constitution of 1902.

The school board continued to operate a segregated system in the wake of the Brown rulings, on the authority of several "massive resistance" state laws enacted to resist them. One such law, the Pupil Placement Act, divested local boards of authority to assign children to particular schools and centralized that power with the newly created State Pupil Placement Board. Under the act, children were automatically reassigned to their prior school each year unless they applied for transfer to another school and the board approved their application. New students' schools were also assigned by the board.

At the time of the 1960 census, in New Kent County, Virginia, approximately half of the 4,500 residents were African American. There was little residential segregation, no attendance zones, and about half the students in the county were black. The school system had only two schools, the New Kent School for white students and the George W. Watkins School for black students. Since 1965 students had been bused to the school of their choice, but no white students had ever opted to attend the black school, and only 15% of black students chose to attend the white school.

=== The Civil Rights Act ===
The U.S. Congress, concerned with the lack of progress nationally in school desegregation, and the far-right resistance in the Deep South, included provisions in the Civil Rights Act of 1964 that would withhold federal funding from schools that refused to dismantle segregation, and allowed the federal government to bring desegregation suits. A few years later, with the support of the political branches, the Supreme Court held in Green that broad remedies were needed to desegregate "root and branch". Every school district had an "affirmative duty" to achieve proportional racial enrollment for every public school in a "dual system" This was the end of "colorblind" freedom of choice plans, but in subsequent cases the Supreme Court made it more cumbersome to challenge racial inequality in schools that had never been segregated under Jim Crow laws.

== Fourth Circuit ==
The case was initially decided by the U.S. District Court for the Eastern District of Virginia in Richmond after plaintiffs filed suit in 1965 for injunctive relief against maintenance of allegedly segregated schools. In response, the Board, in order to remain eligible for federal financial aid, adopted a "freedom of choice" plan for desegregating the schools. The plan permitted students, except those entering the first and eighth grades, to choose annually between the schools; those not choosing were assigned to the school previously attended; first and eighth graders must affirmatively choose a school. In 1965, thirty-five black students enrolled in the previously all-white New Kent school. The District Court approved the plan, as amended.

More than a hundred additional African-American students enrolled each year in 1966 and 1967. The newly enrolled black students reported harassment by their white peers, to which teachers and administrators turned a blind eye. The case was argued before the U.S. Court of Appeals for the Fourth Circuit on January 9, 1967, and decided June 12, 1967. The Court of Appeals approved the "freedom of choice" provisions, although it remanded for a more specific and comprehensive order concerning teachers. During the plan's three years of operation, no white student chose to attend the all-African-American school, and although 115 Black pupils enrolled in the formerly all-white school, 85% of the African-American students in the system still attended the all-Black school.

== Supreme Court ==
This case was argued during the same term as Raney v. Board of Education of Gould School District and Monroe v. Board of Commissioners of Jackson, Tenn. In the latter case, the desegregation plan in question was called "free transfer."

NAACP Legal Defense Fund lawyers Samuel W. Tucker, Jack Greenberg, Henry L. Marsh, III, James Nabrit III, Michael Meltsner and Oliver W. Hill argued and prepared the petitioners' case, and Tucker presented their arguments. Frederick T. Gray represented the school board, and Louis F. Claiborne served as amicus curiae.

=== Decision ===
In a unanimous decision the Supreme Court held that New Kent's freedom of choice plan did not comply with the mandate of Brown II "to effectuate a transition" to a "unitary" school system.

New Kent argued that Brown only required that states "take down the fence" keeping students from attending the schools they wanted, but did not require racially balanced school enrollment. The Court was skeptical of New Kent's freedom of choice plan due in part to the county's slowness: "it is relevant that this first step did not come until some 11 years after Brown I was decided and 10 years after Brown II directed the making of a 'prompt and reasonable start.' ... Moreover, a plan that, at this late date, fails to provide meaningful assurance of prompt and effective disestablishment of a dual system is also intolerable. 'The time for mere 'deliberate speed' has run out,' Griffin v. County School Board, 377 U. S. 218, 377 U. S. 234."

Although the Court did not rule that all "freedom of choice" plans were unconstitutional, it held that in New Kent County's case the freedom-of-choice plan violated the Constitution:

"Freedom of choice" is not a sacred talisman; it is only a means to a constitutionally required end—the abolition of the system of segregation and its effects. If the means prove effective, it is acceptable, but if it fails to undo segregation, other means must be used to achieve this end.

Green required school districts to "come forward with a plan that...promises to realistically work now."

== Impact of Green and the five "Green factors" ==
1968

“When this opinion is handed down, the traffic light will have changed from Brown to Green.”

— U.S. Supreme Court Justice William J. Brennan, Jr.

Brown had represented a moral consensus in the United States. By contrast, Green was widely criticized. Georgia's governor ordered state flags to be flown at half-mast. Many white families moved to the suburbs, and most of the white students who remained in cities transferred to private schools. The Ku Klux Klan organized weekly parades at the home of a circuit court judge who ordered desegregation busing for school districts that did not meet the Green standards.

To comply with the Court's mandate that school boards must take affirmative measures to dismantle segregated schools, the school board separated the New Kent and George Watkins schools by grade level, rather than race. The Watkins School became George Watkins Elementary School, and New Kent became New Kent High School.

In the decades following Green, courts throughout the U.S. used five criteria identified in Green, known as the five Green factors, to assess whether school systems had sufficiently desegregated. The Green factors are: (1) faculty, (2) staff, (3) transportation, (4) extracurricular activities, and (5) facilities. These five Green factors from the following text in Green, assessing New Kent's failure to integrate:

"Racial identification of the system's schools was complete, extending not just to the composition of student bodies at the two schools, but to every facet of school operations -- faculty, staff, transportation, extracurricular activities and facilities."

This guidance built on the Court's previous guidance from Brown II in 1955 where the Supreme Court charged the district courts to: "consider problems related to administration arising from the physical condition of the school plant, the school transportation system, personnel, revision of school districts and attendance areas ... and revision of local laws and regulations."

== 50th anniversary celebration ==
Several events took place in New Kent County, Virginia during May 2018 to celebrate 50 years since the Supreme Court's ruling on the case. The Green vs County School Board of New Kent organization has a list of the events. In 2018, the Library of Virginia honored Calvin Coolidge Green (1931–2011), pastor, soldier, educator, civil rights activist and father of named plaintiff Charles Green, as one of its Strong Men and Women.

== See also ==
- List of United States Supreme Court cases, volume 391
