= Emmaus Baptist Church =

Historic church in Virginia, US

- U.S. National Register of Historic Places
- Virginia Landmarks Register
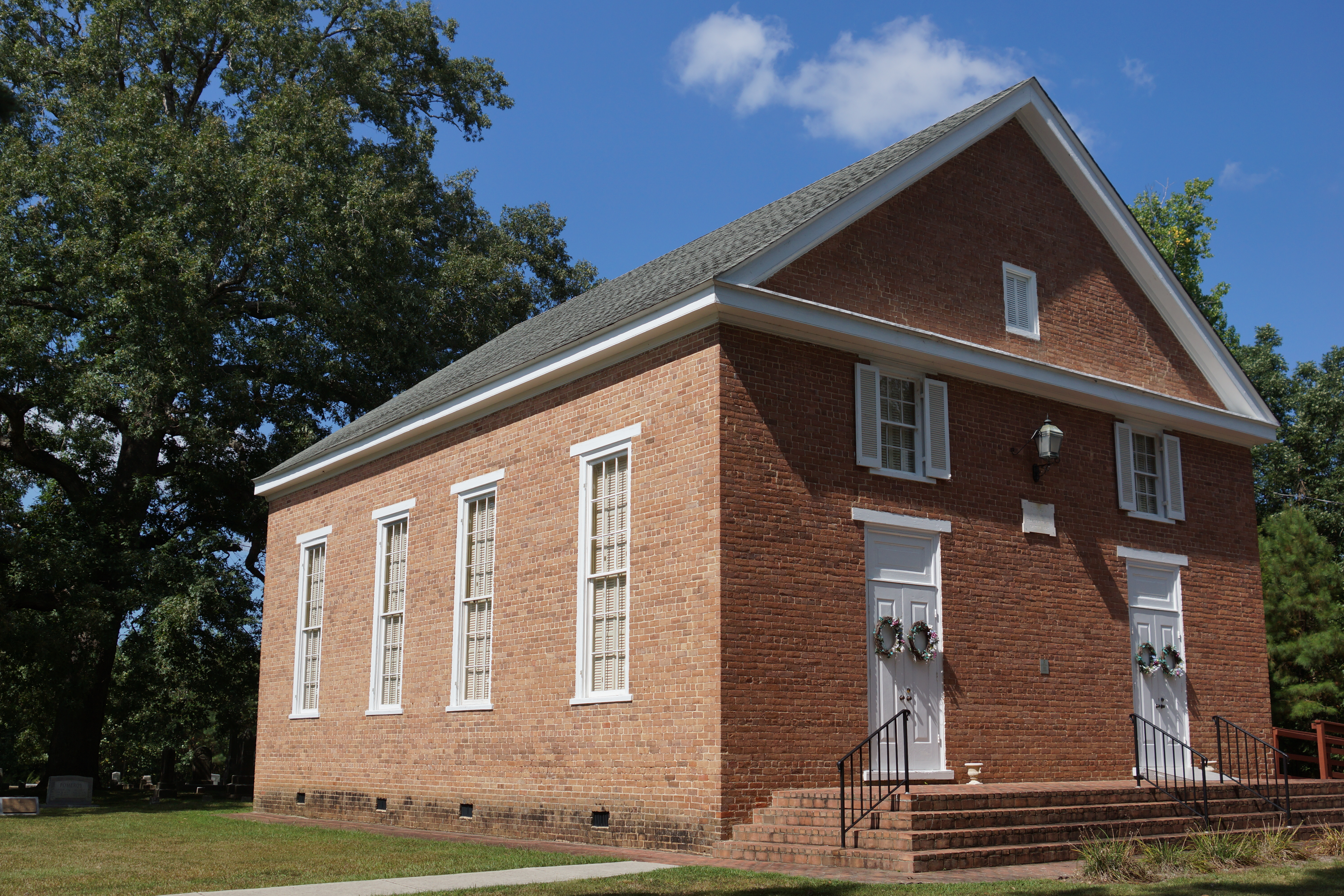

- Location within Virginia Location within the United States
- Location: VA 106 west side, 0.4 miles (0.64 km) south of I-64, near Providence Forge, Virginia
- Coordinates: 37°29′56″N 77°5′33″W
- Area: 1.2 acres (0.49 ha)
- Built: 1849-1852
- Architectural style: Greek Revival
- NRHP reference No.: 93000506
- VLR No.: 063-0011

Significant dates
- Added to NRHP: June 10, 1993
- Designated VLR: April 21, 1993

Emmaus Baptist Church is a historic Southern Baptist church located near Providence Forge, New Kent County, Virginia. It was built between 1849 and 1852, and is a rectangular, simple nave- plan structure in the Greek Revival style. It measures 38 feet wide by 50 feet long. Also on the property is a contributing church cemetery that contains 195 tombstones with dates ranging from 1855 to 1989.

It was listed on the National Register of Historic Places in 1993.
