= Cedar Grove (Providence Forge, Virginia) =

Historic house in Virginia, United States

- U.S. National Register of Historic Places
- Virginia Landmarks Register
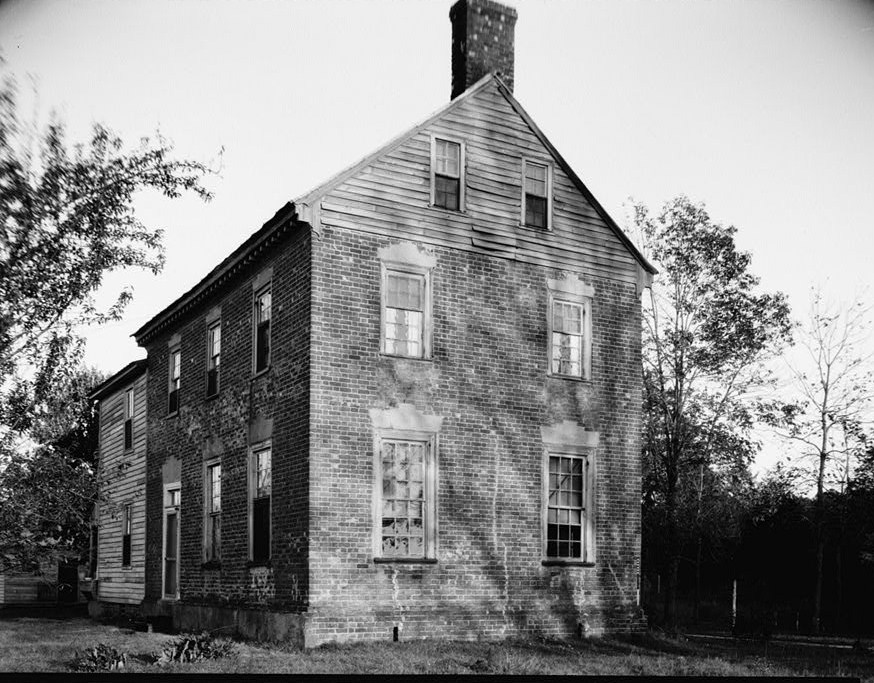
- Cedar Grove, HABS Photo

- Location within Virginia Location within the United States
- Location: Southwest of New Kent off VA 608, near Providence Forge, Virginia
- Coordinates: 37°29′07″N 77°06′57″W
- Area: 14 acres (5.7 ha)
- Built: c. 1810, c. 1916
- NRHP reference No.: 79003058
- VLR No.: 063-0036

Significant dates
- Added to NRHP: December 28, 1979
- Designated VLR: October 16, 1979

Cedar Grove is a historic plantation house located near Providence Forge, New Kent County, Virginia. The main section was built about 1810, and is a 2 1/2-story, single pile, brick structure. The frame section was added about 1916. It has a traditional one-room side-hall plan. Also on the property are a contributing smokehouse and several sheds added about 1916. It was the farm residence of the Christians, a leading county family of colonial and early-Republican times. The 19th-century cemetery contains the graves of the Christian family, including Letitia Christian Tyler, the first wife of President John Tyler.

It was listed on the National Register of Historic Places in 1979.
