= Leggett, North Carolina =

- Town
- Location in Edgecombe County and the state of North Carolina.
- Coordinates: 35°59′22″N 77°34′48″W
- Country: United States
- State: North Carolina
- County: Edgecombe

Area
  - Total: 0.78 sq mi (2.01 km^{2})
  - Land: 0.78 sq mi (2.01 km^{2})
  - Water: 0 sq mi (0.00 km^{2})
- Elevation: 66 ft (20 m)

Population (2020)
  - Total: 37
  - Density: 47.6/sq mi (18.38/km^{2})
- Time zone: UTC-5 (Eastern (EST))
  - Summer (DST): UTC-4 (EDT)
- ZIP code: 27886
- Area code: 252
- FIPS code: 37-37640
- GNIS feature ID: 2406000

Leggett is a town in Edgecombe County, North Carolina, United States. It is part of the Rocky Mount, North Carolina Metropolitan Statistical Area. The population was 37 in the 2020 Census.

== History ==
Cedar Lane, Mount Prospect, and William and Susan Savage House are listed on the National Register of Historic Places.

== Geography ==
According to the United States Census Bureau, the town has a total area of 0.7 square miles (1.8 km^{2}), all land.

== Demographics ==
Historical population
Census	Pop.	Note	%±
1970	120		—
1980	99		−17.5%
1990	108		9.1%
2000	77		−28.7%
2010	60		−22.1%
2020	37		−38.3%
U.S. Decennial Census

As of the census of 2000, there were 77 people, 29 households, and 22 families residing in the town. The population density was 110.8 inhabitants per square mile (42.8/km^{2}). There were 33 housing units at an average density of 47.5 per square mile (18.3/km^{2}). The racial makeup of the town was 66.23% White, 32.47% African American and 1.30% Native American. Hispanic or Latino of any race were 2.60% of the population.

There were 29 households, out of which 10.3% had children under the age of 18 living with them, 58.6% were married couples living together, 17.2% had a female householder with no husband present, and 20.7% were non-families. 17.2% of all households were made up of individuals, and 10.3% had someone living alone who was 65 years of age or older. The average household size was 2.66 and the average family size was 3.04.

In the town, the population was spread out, with 18.2% under the age of 18, 3.9% from 18 to 24, 24.7% from 25 to 44, 28.6% from 45 to 64, and 24.7% who were 65 years of age or older. The median age was 47 years. For every 100 females, there were 83.3 males. For every 100 females age 18 and over, there were 85.3 males.

The median income for a household in the town was $43,125, and the median income for a family was $46,250. Males had a median income of $16,250 versus $34,063 for females. The per capita income for the town was $17,112. There were 6.7% of families and 18.6% of the population living below the poverty line, including no under eighteens and 12.5% of those over 64.
