= Mount Prospect (Leggett, North Carolina) =

Historic house in North Carolina, United States

- U.S. National Register of Historic Places
- Location within North Carolina Location within the United States
- Location: Jct. of SR 1409 and SR 1428, near Leggett, North Carolina
- Coordinates: 36°00′27″N 77°38′29″W
- Area: 10 acres (4.0 ha)
- Built: c. 1772
- Architectural style: Georgian, Late Georgian
- NRHP reference No.: 74001347
- Added to NRHP: November 20, 1974

Mount Prospect, also known as the Exum Lewis House, was a historic plantation house located near Leggett, Edgecombe County, North Carolina. It was built about 1772, and was a two-story, five-bay, Late Georgian style frame dwelling. It had a Quaker Plan; two-story, 19th century addition; and a one-story hip roofed front porch. Also on the property are the contributing family cemetery, a smokehouse, barn, brick dairy, and office. The house burned and was torn down in 1976.

It was listed on the National Register of Historic Places in 1974.
