= William and Susan Savage House =

Historic house in North Carolina, United States

- U.S. National Register of Historic Places
- Location within North Carolina Location within the United States
- Location: 704 NC 97 E, near Leggett, North Carolina
- Coordinates: 35°59′42″N 77°34′11″W
- Area: 1.26 acres (0.51 ha)
- Built: c. 1815
- Architectural style: Federal
- NRHP reference No.: 14000518
- Added to NRHP: August 25, 2014

William and Susan Savage House, also known as Savage-Combs House, is a historic home located near Leggett, Edgecombe County, North Carolina. It was built about 1815, and is a 1 1/2-story, five-bay, double pile, Federal style frame dwelling. It has a brick-pier foundation, a side-gable roof, and gable-end exterior chimneys. The house was restored in the 1990s.

It was listed on the National Register of Historic Places in 2014.
