= Hampstead (Tunstall, Virginia) =

Historic house in Virginia, United States

- U.S. National Register of Historic Places
- Virginia Landmarks Register
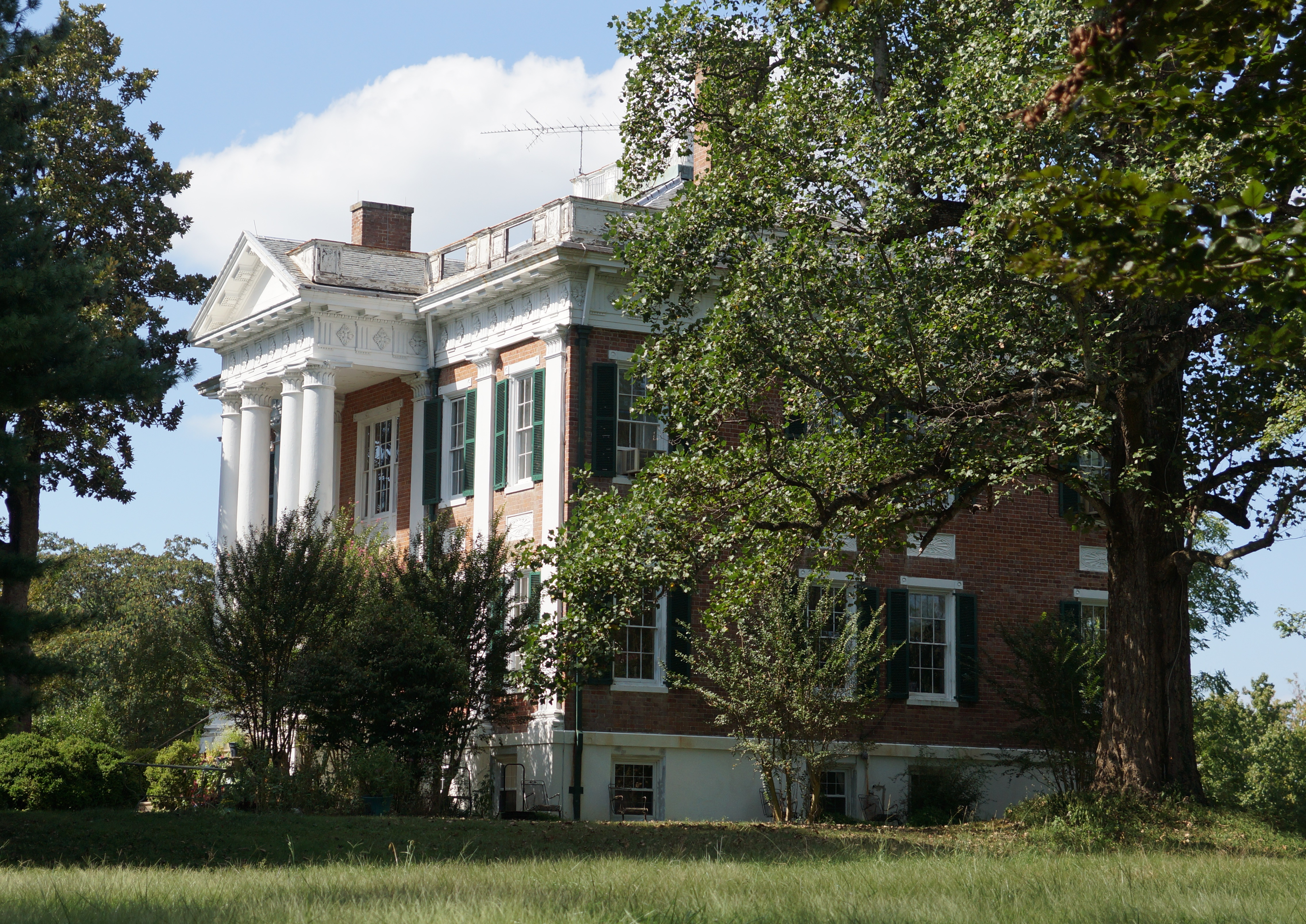

- Location within Virginia Location within the United States
- Location: 1 mile (1.6 km) northwest of the junction of Rtes. 606 and 607, near Tunstall, Virginia
- Coordinates: 37°35′56″N 77°07′20″W
- Area: 1,000 acres (400 ha)
- Built: c. 1825
- Architectural style: Federal
- NRHP reference No.: 70000812
- VLR No.: 063-0013

Significant dates
- Added to NRHP: December 18, 1970
- Designated VLR: October 6, 1970

Hampstead is a historic plantation house located near Tunstall, New Kent County, Virginia. It was built about 1825, as a two-story, rectangular Federal style brick dwelling with a hipped roof. The front facade features alternating window bays and pilasters and a central two-story pedimented projecting portico. Also located on the property are the contributing ruins of a granary, an 18th-century cottage and an icehouse

It was listed on the National Register of Historic Places in 1970.
