= Spring Hill (Providence Forge, Virginia) =

Historic house in Virginia, United States

- U.S. National Register of Historic Places
- Virginia Landmarks Register
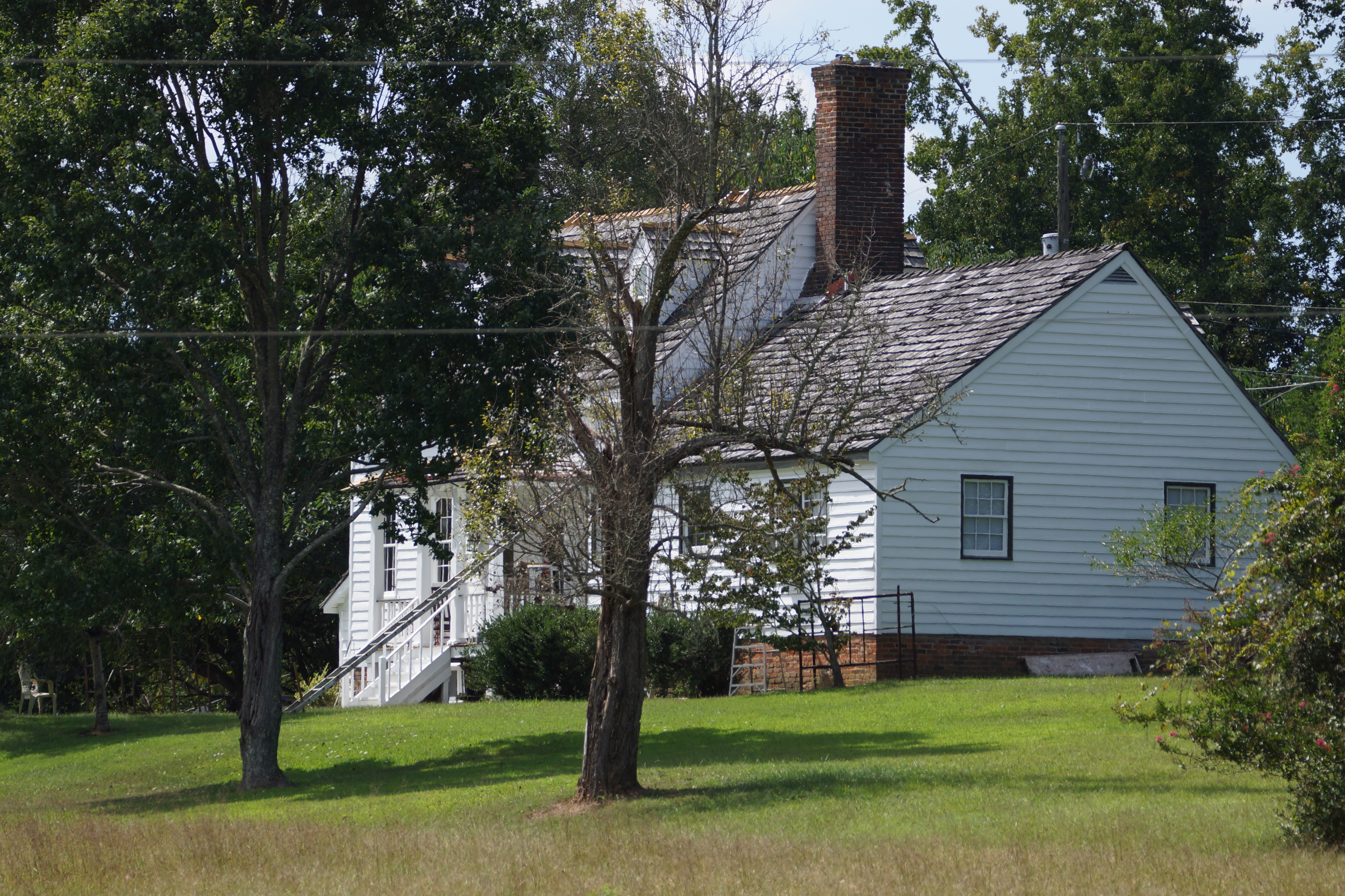

- Location within Virginia Location within the United States
- Location: 11221 Carriage Rd., near Providence Forge, Virginia
- Coordinates: 37°29′56″N 77°5′33″W
- Area: 11.1 acres (4.5 ha)
- Built: 1782
- Architectural style: Federal
- NRHP reference No.: 02001448
- VLR No.: 063-0080

Significant dates
- Added to NRHP: November 27, 2002
- Designated VLR: September 11, 2002

Spring Hill is a historic home located near Providence Forge, Virginia. It was built about 1765, and is a 1 1/2-story, five-bay, gable-roofed, timber-frame Federal style dwelling. It has a center-hall plan. An addition was built in 1947. Also on the property is a contributing smokehouse. It is representative of a typical mid- to late-18th-century farmhouse in the Tidewater area of Virginia.

The house was constructed by Richard Croshaw Graves prior to the American Revolution. During the American Revolution (1776–82), he commanded the New Kent and Charles County militias. Following the war, he returned to his plantation, which he named "Indian Fields," and built a new residence for his expanding family between 1782 and 1784. Graves passed away there in 1798. The property passed to his son, Colonel Richard Graves. The Graves family held ownership of Indian Fields until it was sold in 1863.

Local legend has it that Thomas Jefferson spent the eve of his wedding to Martha Wayles Skelton at Indian Fields with his friend Richard C. Graves. The young lawyer was traveling from Williamsburg, where he was attending court sessions, to Martha's family home, "The Forest," located in Charles City County. He began his journey on Christmas Eve, and arrived at "The Forest" shortly after Christmas Day, 1771. He would have spent Christmas en route with the Graves family. Jefferson applied for a marriage license on December 31, 1771, and the couple was married on New Year's Day, 1772.

It was listed on the National Register of Historic Places in 2002.
