= Former New Kent High School =

Historic school in Virginia, US

- New Kent High School; George W. Watkins High School
- U.S. National Register of Historic Places
- U.S. National Historic Landmark
- Virginia Landmarks Register
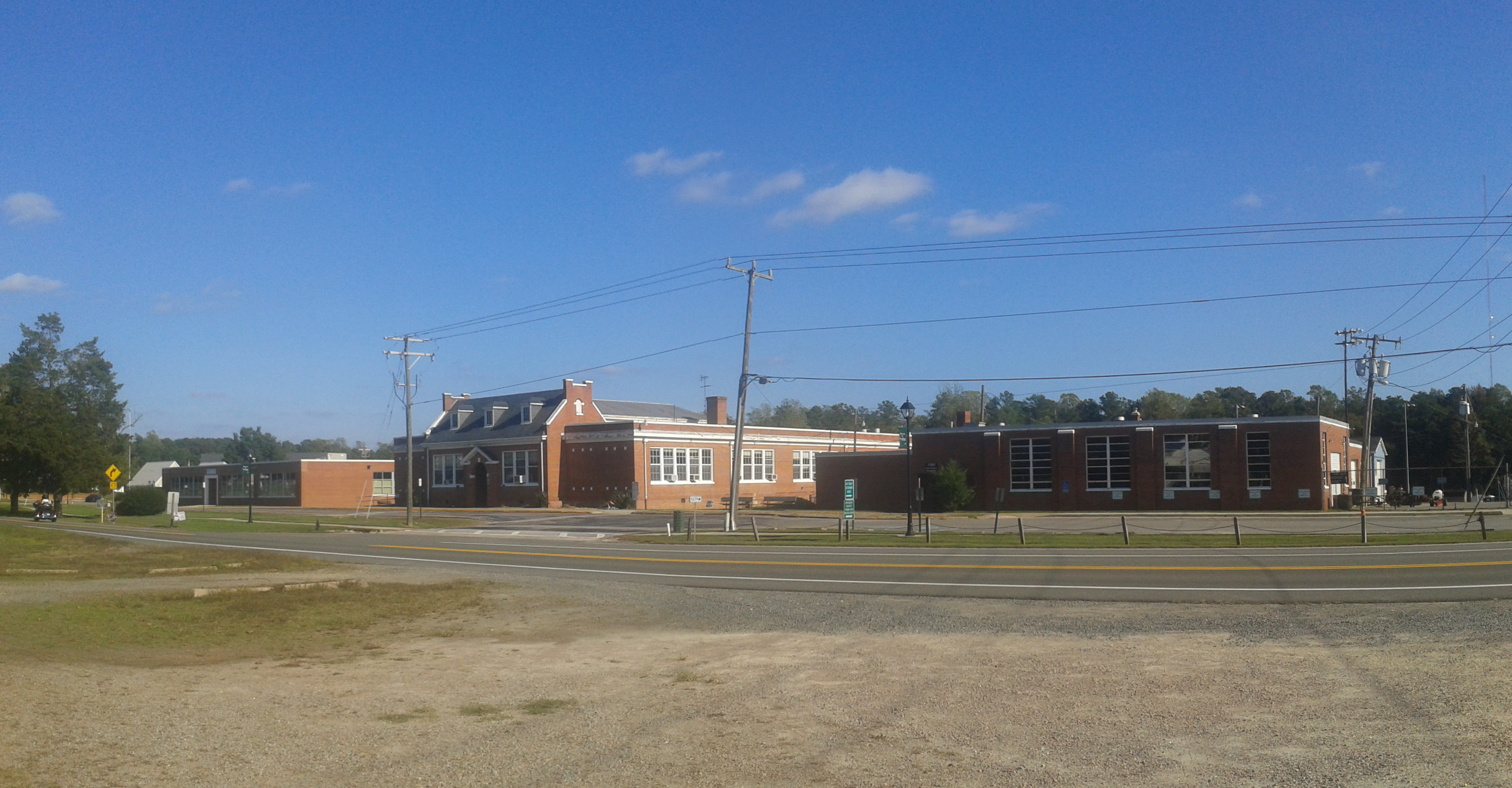
- The old New Kent High School in October 2016

- Location within Virginia Location within the United States
- Location: 11825 New Kent Hwy, New Kent, Virginia
- Coordinates: 37.5157°N 76.9808°W
- Area: 9 acres (3.6 ha)
- Built: 1930
- NRHP reference No.: 01001046
- VLR No.: 063-0318

Significant dates
- Added to NRHP: August 7, 2001
- Designated NHL: August 7, 2001
- Designated VLR: June 13, 2001

New Kent High School is a historic school in New Kent, Virginia. The school, along with the nearby George W. Watkins Elementary School, is associated with the landmark Supreme Court case Green v. County School Board of New Kent County (1968), in which the court defined what the standards of Brown v. Board of Education were in the desegregation cases. This decision ended the era of Massive Resistance and ushered in the era of integration.

== History ==
Before desegregation, George Watkins was the county's African American-only high school, while New Kent School was the high school for whites. The name for the former was in honor of Dr. George W. Watkins, who served as the pastor of the Second Liberty Baptist Church from 1928 to 1971. During this time, he encouraged church members to take leadership roles in the community, such as on the local school board, planning commission, board of supervisors, and other civic and religious organizations. The most notable of those who followed this advice was Dr. Calvin C. Green, who led the push for desegregation in Green v. County School Board.

In 1954, the Brown v. Board of Education overturned the "separate but equal" doctrine, but it was not specific on remedies that educational systems had to take to remove discrimination. The 1955 "Brown II" ruling on relief called only for desegregation at "all deliberate speed", which many interpreted to allow active resistance. Many school systems made changes which allowed them to avoid the most blatant appearance of discrimination, but which achieved only token amounts of integration. Notably, the 1955 Briggs appeals court decision was one that held that the constitution "'does not require integration. It merely forbids discrimination.'", and this was used to avoid taking active steps towards integration.

In reaction to the Brown v. Board decision, the New Kent County School System implemented a choice system in 1967, through which students were given a choice to either attend New Kent High School or George Watkins High School. The plan resulted in some African Americans attending New Kent but no whites attending Watkins. In Green v. County School Board of New Kent County, the Supreme Court ruled that the choice plan was unconstitutional. Watkins was soon converted into a middle school and an integrated New Kent High School became the county school for grades 9-12.

The pair of schools were designated as a single National Historic Landmark in 2001.

The campus is now used as the New Kent campus of Rappahannock Community College. The New Kent County school district has since built a new high school south of the former school. The George W. Watkins High School has undergone significant renovations to function as George W. Watkins Elementary School.

== See also ==
- List of National Historic Landmarks in Virginia
- National Register of Historic Places listings in New Kent County, Virginia
