= Cedar Lane (Leggett, North Carolina) =

Historic house in North Carolina, United States

- U.S. National Register of Historic Places
- Location within North Carolina Location within the United States
- Location: N of Tarboro off NC 44, near Leggett, North Carolina
- Coordinates: 35°59′05″N 77°30′32″W
- Area: 46.1 acres (18.7 ha)
- Built: late 1840s
- Architectural style: Greek Revival
- NRHP reference No.: 82003451
- Added to NRHP: April 15, 1982

Cedar Lane, also known as Fountain House, is a historic plantation house located near Leggett, Edgecombe County, North Carolina. It was built in the late-1840s, and is a two-story, double-pile, three bays wide, vernacular Greek Revival style frame dwelling. Also on the property are the contributing cook's house, dairy and electric plant, a smokehouse, tool shed, barn, and carriage house.

It was listed on the National Register of Historic Places in 1982.
