= New Kent High School =

Location
- 7365 Egypt Road; New Kent, Virginia 23124; United States
- Coordinates: 37°30′37.4″N 76°59′8.7″W

Information
- School type: Public high school
- School district: New Kent County School Division
- Superintendent: Brian Nichols
- Principal: Allison Strickland
- Grades: 9–12
- Enrollment: 985 (2016-17)
- Colors: Royal Blue & White
- Athletics conference: Virginia High School League; Bay Rivers District; Class 3, Region A
- Mascot: Trojan
- Website: http://nkhs.newkentschools.org/

New Kent High School is a public high school located in New Kent, Virginia, east of Richmond. Athletic teams compete in the Virginia High School League's Bay Rivers District in Group 3A.

The school relocated to a new facility for the 2008–2009 school year. Before that, it occupied the location of the current New Kent Middle School, and before that, that of the historic high school. The school is known as a state powerhouse in wrestling; their program won the Group 3A state title four years in a row, from 2019 to 2022, and was runner-up in 2023 and 2024. New Kent has also won seven consecutive regional wrestling championships as of 2024.

== Accreditation and rankings ==
- New Kent High is fully accredited by the Virginia Department of Education and has been accredited by the Southern Association of Colleges and Schools since 1974.

== Notable alumni ==
- Jamion Christian, former head coach, men’s basketball, George Washington University (DC)
- Jarrell Christian, head coach, Maine Celtics
