= Providence Forge, Virginia =

Unincorporated community in Virginia, US

Coordinates: 37°26′31″N 77°02′37″W

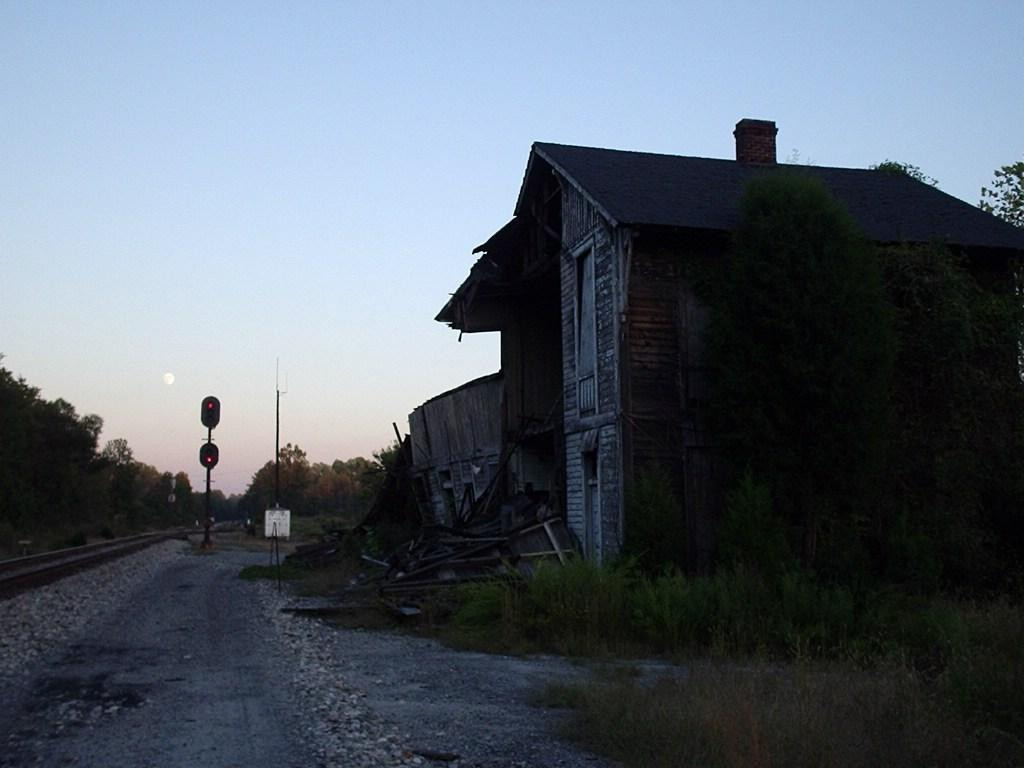
The Providence Forge railroad depot is no longer in existence.

Providence Forge is an unincorporated community in New Kent County, Virginia, United States. It was one of the earliest settlements in the county (itself formed by 1654) and the site of a colonial iron forge that was destroyed by British General Banastre Tarleton during the American Revolution.

Nearby, the Chickahominy River separates New Kent from Charles City County. U.S. Route 60 and State Route 155 pass through Providence Forge. The Colonial Downs horse-racing facility is located nearby adjacent to the Providence Forge exit of Interstate 64.

A station on the Chesapeake and Ohio Railway (C&O) was located at Providence Forge in 1881 during construction of the railroad's new Peninsula Subdivision, which was built primarily to facilitate transportation of West Virginia bituminous coal to the newly created city of Newport News. There, on the harbor of Hampton Roads, coal piers were built to load colliers for worldwide export shipment.

The C&O's Peninsula Extension was good news for the farmers and merchants of the Virginia Peninsula, and they generally welcomed the railroad. Providence Forge was a stop for passengers until about 1931 and for freight until at least the late 1960s, according to the Chesapeake & Ohio Historical Society. The structure was dismantled sometime in 2006. The only similar structure, at Lee Hall, has been preserved and efforts were underway in 2008 to relocate it slightly away from the right-of-way and open it as a museum.

Cedar Grove, Emmaus Baptist Church, Olivet Presbyterian Church, and Spring Hill are listed on the National Register of Historic Places.
