= Quinton, Virginia =

Unincorporated community in Virginia, United States

- Unincorporated community
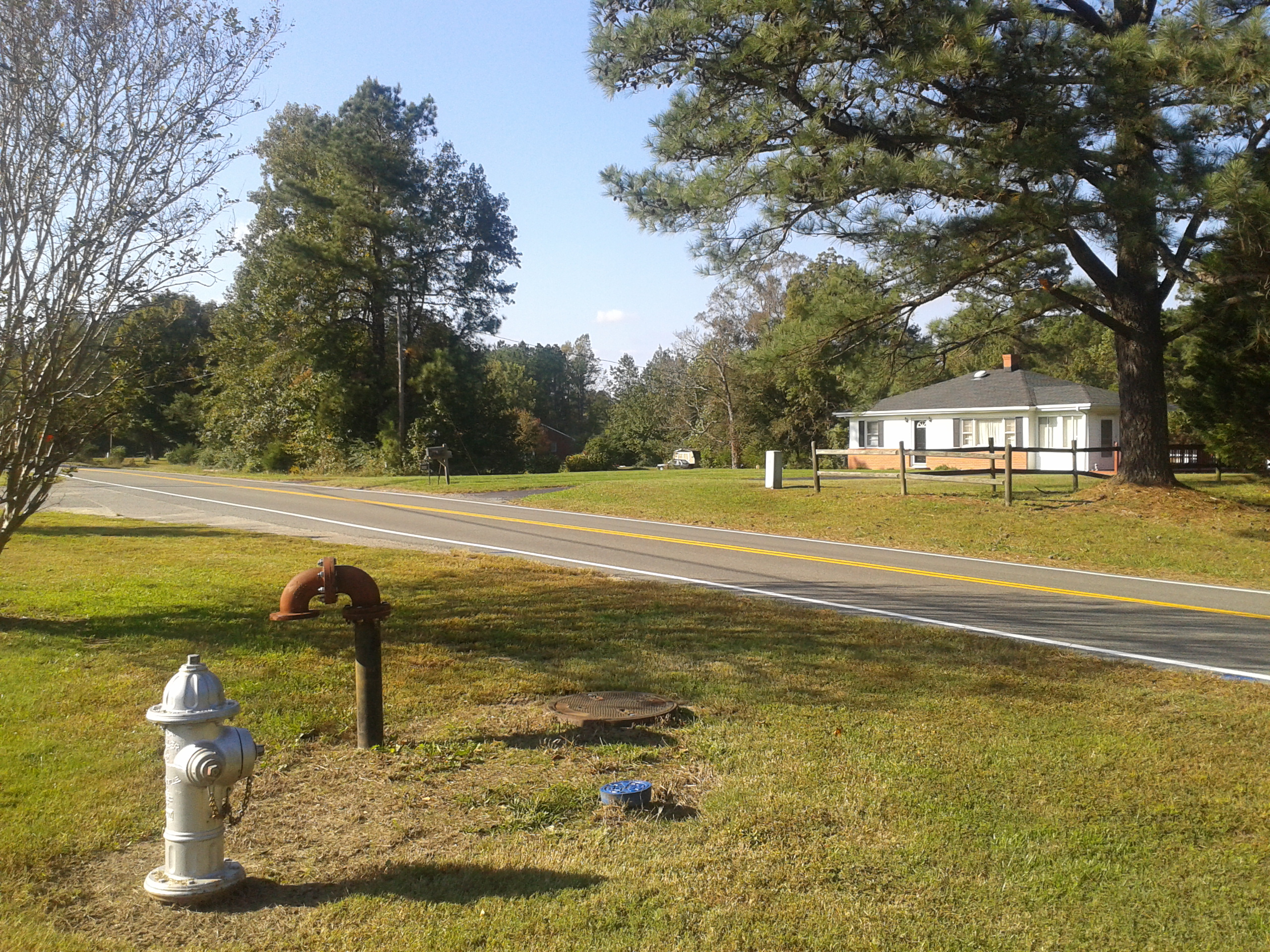
- House and roadway in Quinton

- Location within Virginia Location within the United States
- Coordinates: 37°32′02″N 77°07′16″W
- Country: United States
- State: Virginia
- County: New Kent
- Elevation: 151 ft (46 m)
- Time zone: UTC-5 (Eastern (EST))
  - Summer (DST): UTC-4 (EDT)
- ZIP code: 23141
- Area code: 804
- GNIS feature ID: 1472912

Quinton is a small unincorporated community in New Kent County, Virginia, United States. It is located on State Route 249 in the western portion of the county.

Crump's Mill and Millpond and New Kent High School and George W. Watkins High School are listed on the National Register of Historic Places.
