= New Kent, Virginia =

Census-designated place in Virginia, US

Coordinates: 37°31′04″N 76°58′44″W

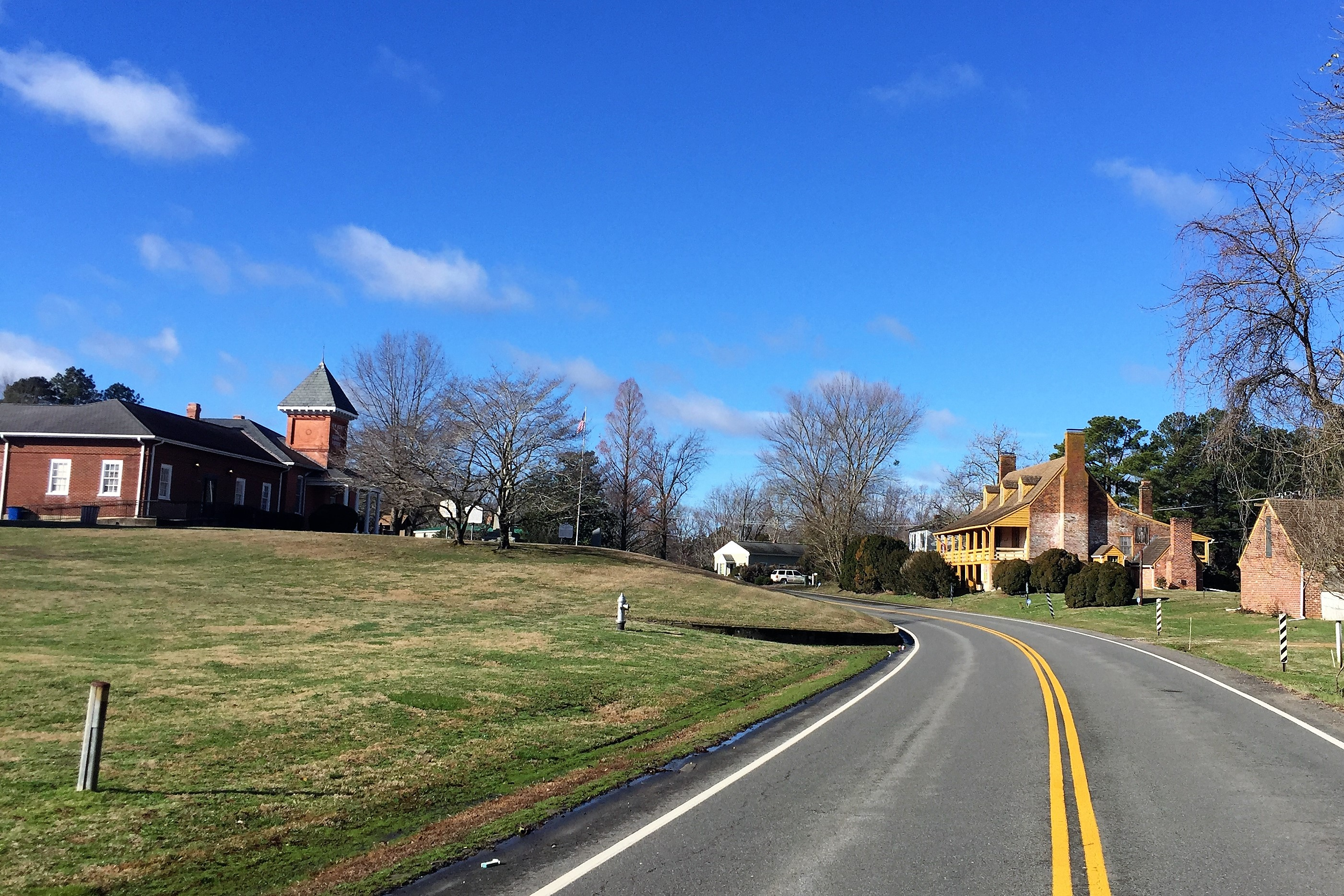
A view along New Kent Highway

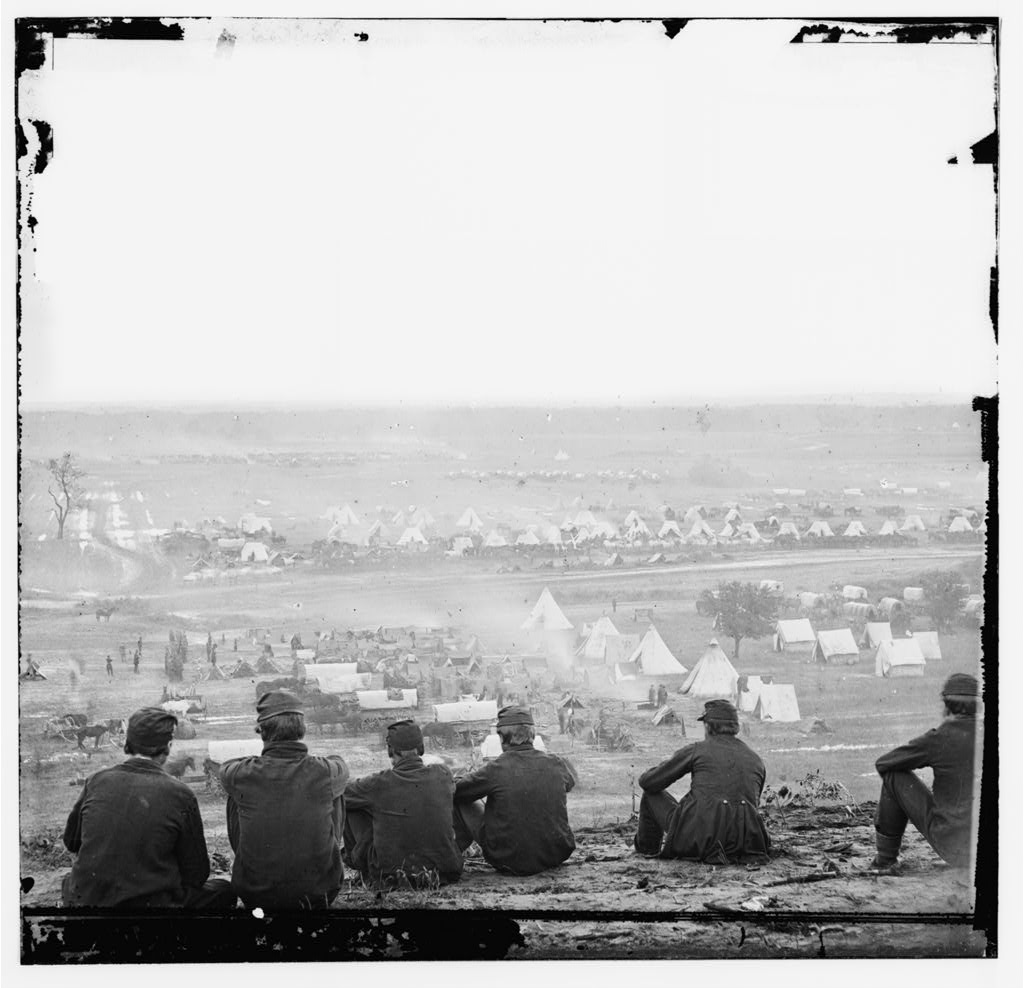
Union Army camp at Cumberland Landing, May 1862

New Kent is a census-designated place (CDP) in and the county seat of New Kent County, Virginia, United States. The population as of the 2020 Census was 739.

Cumberland Landing, Cumberland Plantation, and the Cumberland Marsh Natural Area Preserve are near New Kent.

Criss Cross and St. Peter's Church are listed on the National Register of Historic Places, and New Kent High School and George W. Watkins High School are National Historic Landmarks.

== Notable people ==
- Jamion Christian, former head coach, men's basketball, George Washington University (DC).
- Jarrell Christian, head coach, Maine Celtics.
- Letitia Christian Tyler, the first wife of President John Tyler and first lady of the United States from 1841 to 1842.
- Anthony G. Crutchfield, Army lieutenant general
- Martha Washington, George Washington's wife and first First Lady of the United States of America.

== Demographics ==
Historical population
Census	Pop.	Note	%±
2010	239		—
2020	739		209.2%
U.S. Decennial Census; 2000 2010

New Kent was first listed as a census designated place in the 2010 U.S. census.

=== Racial and ethnic composition ===
New Kent CDP, Virginia – Racial and ethnic composition Note: the US Census treats Hispanic/Latino as an ethnic category. This table excludes Latinos from the racial categories and assigns them to a separate category. Hispanics/Latinos may be of any race.
Race / Ethnicity (NH = Non-Hispanic)	Pop 2010	Pop 2020	% 2010	% 2020
White alone (NH)	197	574	82.43%	77.67%
Black or African American alone (NH)	23	77	9.62%	10.42%
Native American or Alaska Native alone (NH)	0	1	0.00%	0.14%
Asian alone (NH)	1	5	0.42%	0.68%
Native Hawaiian or Pacific Islander alone (NH)	0	1	0.00%	0.14%
Other race alone (NH)	0	5	0.00%	0.68%
Mixed race or Multiracial (NH)	12	38	5.02%	5.14%
Hispanic or Latino (any race)	6	38	2.51%	5.14%
Total	239	739	100.00%	100.00%

== See also ==
- New Kent High School
- New Kent High School and George W. Watkins High School
