= New Kent County, Virginia =

County in Virginia, United States

- County
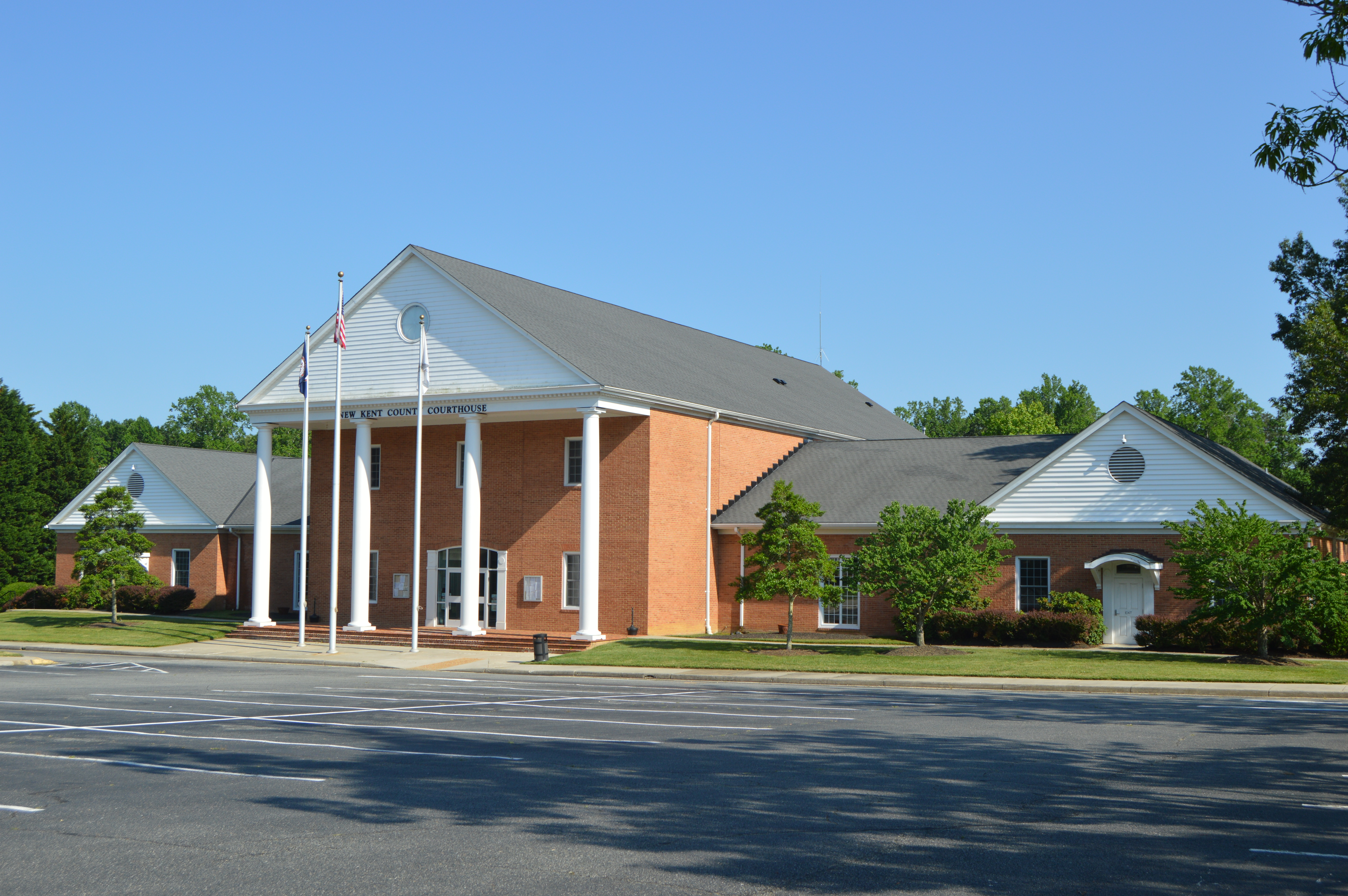
- County courthouse

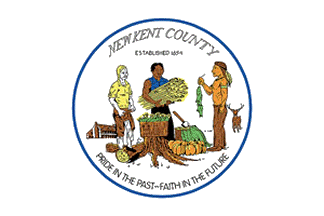
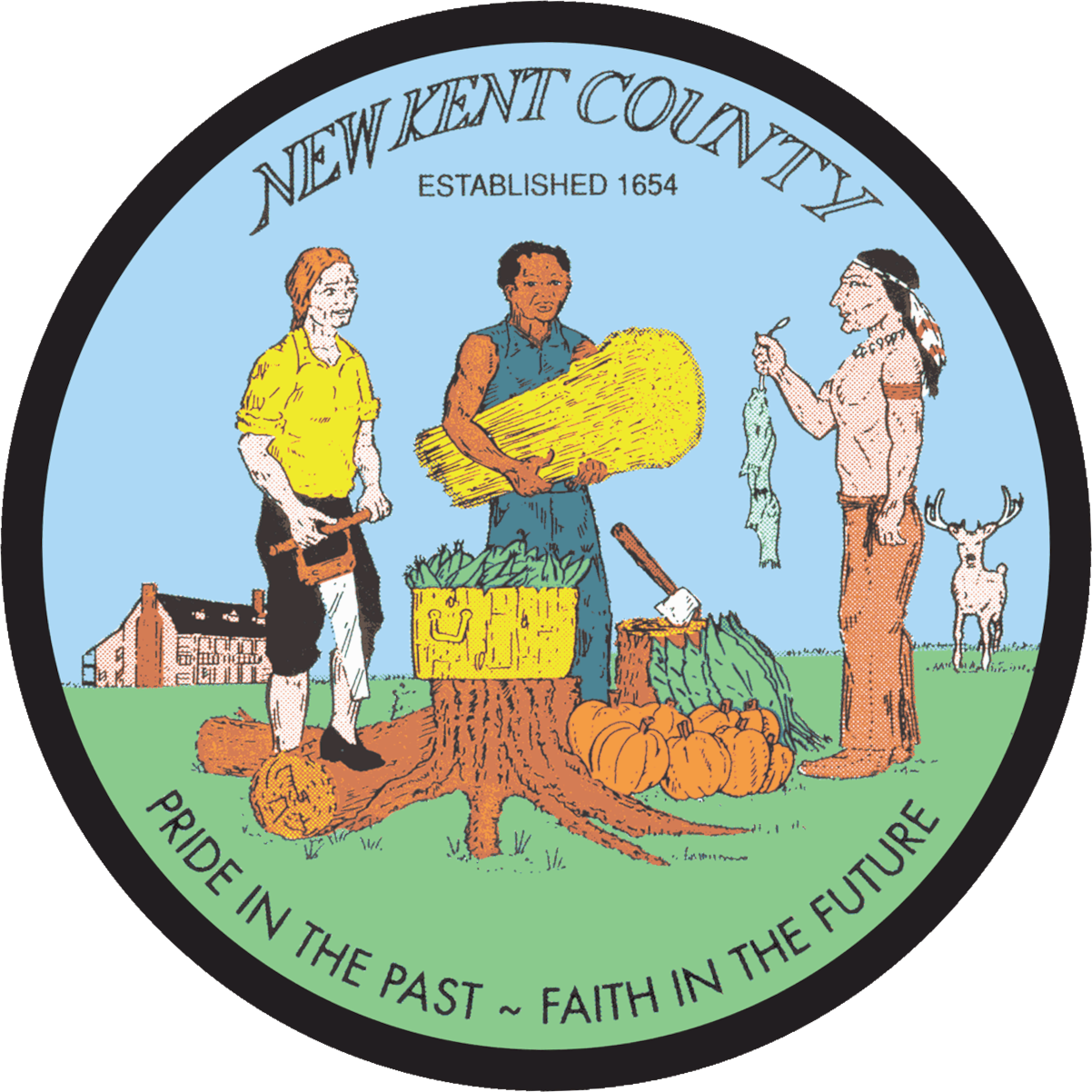
- Flag Seal

- Location within the U.S. state of Virginia
- Coordinates: 37°31′N 77°00′W
- Country: United States
- State: Virginia
- Founded: 1654
- Named for: Kent, England
- Seat: New Kent

Area
  - Total: 222 sq mi (570 km^{2})
  - Land: 210 sq mi (540 km^{2})
  - Water: 14 sq mi (36 km^{2}) 6.1%

Population (2020)
  - Total: 28,848
  - Estimate (2026): 28,848 ▲
  - Density: 140/sq mi (53/km^{2})
- Time zone: UTC−5 (Eastern)
  - Summer (DST): UTC−4 (EDT)
- Congressional district: 1st
- Website: www.newkent-va.us

New Kent County is a county in the southeastern part of the Commonwealth of Virginia. As of 2026, its population was 22,945. Its county seat is New Kent.

New Kent County is located east of the Greater Richmond Region and is part of the Richmond and the Hampton Roads Metropolitan Statistical Area.

== History ==
New Kent County was established in 1654, as the Virginia General Assembly with the governor's consent split York County. The county's name originated because several prominent inhabitants, including William Claiborne, recently had been forced from their settlement at Kent Island, Maryland, by Lord Baltimore upon the formation of Maryland. Claiborne had named the island for his birthplace in Kent, England. Chickahominy and Pamunkey Native Americans frequented this area, as well as nearby Charles City County and King William County, and both tribes remain well-established in this area. The county had two parishes in the colonial era, initially called Blisland (which also included the older James City County as well as York County) and St. Peter's. Among the earliest settlers was Nicholas Gentry, who settled in New Kent in 1684. Parish registers of St. Peter's Parish show that Nicholas Gentry's daughter was baptized in the church in 1687. In 1719 the Virginia General Assembly split New Kent County, and what had been established St. Paul's Parish became Hanover County.

Lieutenant colonel's commission in the county militia issued to Daniel Parke Custis by Governor Sir William Gooch on August 8, 1740

New Kent county's first brick courthouse was built by 1695, but it and two successors were destroyed in 1753 and 1775. Another fire in 1783 destroyed the clerk's office and jail, so few colonial era non-religious records remain. However, a manual entitled "The Office and Authority of a Justice of Peace" published in 1736 by county court justice George Webb, the son of London merchant Conrad Webb and whose son Lewis Webb would briefly represent New Kent county in the House of Burgesses and later in the House of Delegates during the American Revolutionary War. Perhaps the county's most noteworthy patriot during the conflict was James, an enslaved man who became a double agent, and whose reports to the Marquis de Lafayette helped secure victory during the Siege of Yorktown months after British troops led by Lt. Gen. Charles Cornwallis passed through the county seat (and raided local plantations) in June 1781. In addition to men who enlisted in the army, New Kent county also established an American military hospital during the conflict. As the result of arson confessed to by John Price Posey and Thomas Green, and allegedly involving "a negro boy belonging to W. Chamberlayne", many later county records were burned, making identifying relationships between family members difficult.

Two first ladies – Martha Washington and Letitia Christian Tyler – were born in New Kent County. The church where George and Martha Washington are believed to have been wed, St. Peter's, still holds services today.

Confederate and Union troops fought in as well as passed through New Kent County during the Peninsula Campaign of 1862. The Battle of New Market Heights in September 1864 proved a crucial victory as Federal forces pushed toward the capitol in the Richmond-Petersburg Campaign. A later courthouse, damaged during the Civil War, was replaced in 1909.

In the landmark school desegregation case Green v. County School Board of New Kent County (1968), the United States Supreme Court ruled that New Kent County's freedom of choice plan failed to provide prompt and meaningful desegregation mandated under Brown II in 1955. The district's freedom of choice plan, common across the South by the mid-1960s, perpetuated a dual system of white and black schools system. Following the decision, these plans were abandoned as authorities no longer considered them compliant. The New Kent School Board changed to a plan that integrated by grade level, consolidating elementary grades at George W. Watkins Elementary School and secondary grades at New Kent High School.

The historical ties to Hampton Roads stem from its location and the shared history of Virginia's colonial past. The region, known for its military bases, shipyards, and as a commercial and cultural hub, influences the surrounding counties, including New Kent. The proximity to Hampton Roads has led to economic and demographic growth in the county, with residents often commuting to the larger cities such as Newport News and Norfolk for work while enjoying the quieter, rural life that New Kent offers.

== Geography ==
The northeastern border of the county is defined by the meanderings of the Pamunkey River, and the southwestern county border is similarly defined by the Chickahominy River. The county terrain consists of rolling hills, either wooded or devoted to agriculture, and carved by drainages. The terrain slopes to the east and south, with its highest point on the western border at 174 ft (53 m) ASL. The county has a total area of 223 mi^{2} (580 km^{2}), of which 210 mi^{2} (540 km^{2}) are land and 14 square miles (36 km^{2}) (6.23%) are covered by water.

Quinton, VA

Climate chart (precipitation, max. and min. temperature)
J	F	M	A	M	J	J	A	S	O	N	D
3.3 48 27	2.9 51 29	4 60 36	3.3 71 45	3.9 78 54	3.4 86 64	4.5 89 68	4.3 88 66	3.9 81 59	3.2 71 47	3.5 62 39	3.4 51 30
- █ Average max. and min. temperatures in °F
- █ Precipitation totals in inches
Metric conversion
J	F	M	A	M	J	J	A	S	O	N	D
84 9 −3	74 11 −2	102 16 2	84 22 7	99 25 12	86 30 18	114 32 20	109 31 19	99 27 15	81 22 9	89 17 4	86 11 −1
- █ Average max. and min. temperatures in °C
- █ Precipitation totals in mm

=== Adjacent counties ===
- King William County – north
- King and Queen County – northeast
- James City County – southeast
- Charles City County -south
- Henrico County – southwest
- Hanover County – west

=== Protected areas ===
- Crawfords State Forest
- Cumberland Marsh Natural Area Preserve

=== Lakes ===
- Cooks Millpond
- Davis Pond
- Davis Pond North
- Diascund Creek Reservoir
- Goddins Pond
- Kent Lake
- Old Forge Pond
- Richardson Millpond (part)
- Taylor Pond

== Demographics ==
Historical population
Census	Pop.	Note	%±
1790	6,239		—
1800	6,363		2.0%
1810	6,478		1.8%
1820	6,630		2.3%
1830	6,458		−2.6%
1840	6,230		−3.5%
1850	6,064		−2.7%
1860	5,884		−3.0%
1870	4,381		−25.5%
1880	5,515		25.9%
1890	5,511		−0.1%
1900	4,865		−11.7%
1910	4,682		−3.8%
1920	4,541		−3.0%
1930	4,300		−5.3%
1940	4,092		−4.8%
1950	3,995		−2.4%
1960	4,504		12.7%
1970	5,300		17.7%
1980	8,781		65.7%
1990	10,445		19.0%
2000	13,462		28.9%
2010	18,429		36.9%
2020	22,945		24.5%
2025 (est.)	28,022	▲	22.1%
U.S. Decennial Census; 1790-1960 1900-1990; 1990-2000 2010-2020

=== Racial and ethnic composition ===
New Kent County, Virginia – Racial and ethnic composition Note: the US Census treats Hispanic/Latino as an ethnic category. This table excludes Latinos from the racial categories and assigns them to a separate category. Hispanics/Latinos may be of any race.
Race / Ethnicity (NH = Non-Hispanic)	Pop 1980	Pop 1990	Pop 2000	Pop 2010	Pop 2020	% 1980	% 1990	% 2000	% 2010	% 2020
White alone (NH)	6,353	8,039	10,727	14,804	17,818	72.35%	76.97%	79.68%	80.33%	77.66%
Black or African American alone (NH)	2,284	2,140	2,165	2,474	2,714	26.01%	20.49%	16.08%	13.42%	11.83%
Native American or Alaska Native alone (NH)	83	136	171	185	225	0.95%	1.30%	1.27%	1.00%	0.98%
Asian alone (NH)	5	32	71	159	223	0.06%	0.31%	0.53%	0.86%	0.97%
Native Hawaiian or Pacific Islander alone (NH)	x	x	2	2	8	x	x	0.01%	0.01%	0.03%
Other race alone (NH)	8	20	14	21	102	0.09%	0.19%	0.10%	0.11%	0.44%
Mixed race or Multiracial (NH)	x	x	136	394	1,124	x	x	1.01%	2.14%	4.90%
Hispanic or Latino (any race)	48	78	176	390	731	0.55%	0.75%	1.31%	2.12%	3.19%
Total	8,781	10,445	13,462	18,429	22,945	100.00%	100.00%	100.00%	100.00%	100.00%

=== 2020 census ===
As of the 2020 census, the county had a population of 22,945. The median age was 44.6 years. 20.8% of residents were under the age of 18 and 19.2% of residents were 65 years of age or older. For every 100 females there were 100.5 males, and for every 100 females age 18 and over there were 99.9 males age 18 and over.

The racial makeup of the county was 78.5% White, 11.9% Black or African American, 1.1% American Indian and Alaska Native, 1.0% Asian, 0.0% Native Hawaiian and Pacific Islander, 1.3% from some other race, and 6.2% from two or more races. Hispanic or Latino residents of any race comprised 3.2% of the population.

0.0% of residents lived in urban areas, while 100.0% lived in rural areas.

There were 8,580 households in the county, of which 31.3% had children under the age of 18 living with them and 17.8% had a female householder with no spouse or partner present. About 17.7% of all households were made up of individuals and 8.5% had someone living alone who was 65 years of age or older.

There were 9,059 housing units, of which 5.3% were vacant. Among occupied housing units, 88.8% were owner-occupied and 11.2% were renter-occupied. The homeowner vacancy rate was 1.3% and the rental vacancy rate was 4.4%.

=== 2010 census ===
As of the 2010 United States census, 18,429 people were living in the county; 81.7% were White, 13.5% African American, 1.1% Native American, 0.9% Asian, 0.5% of some other race, and 2.3% of two or more races. About 2.1% were Hispanic or Latino (of any race). By ancestry, 15.2% were of English, 11.7% American, 10.6% German, and 9.4% Irish descent.

At the 2000 United States census, 13,462 people, 4,925 households and 3,895 families were residing in the county. The population density was 64.1 people per square mile (24.7 people/km^{2}). The 5,203 housing units averaged 24.8 units per square mile (9.6 units/km^{2}). The racial makeup of the county was 80.26% White, 16.20% African American, 1.29% Native American, 0.53% Asian, 0.54% from other races, and 1.17% from two or more races. About 1.31% of the population were Hispanic or Latino of any race.

Of the 4,925 households, 34.70% had children under the age of 18 living with them, 66.60% were married couples living together, 9.00% had a female householder with no husband present, and 20.90% were not families. About 16.60% of all households were made up of individuals, and 5.60% had someone living alone who was 65 years of age or older. The average household size was 2.65, and the average family size was 2.97.

The county's age distribution was 25.00% under 18, 5.90% from 18 to 24, 32.00% from 25 to 44, 27.70% from 45 to 64, and 9.40% who were 65 or older. The median age was 38 years. For every 100 females, there were 102.60 males. For every 100 females aged 18 and over, there were 99.90 males.

The median income for a household was $53,595, and for a family was $60,678. Males had a median income of $40,005 versus $28,894 for females. The per capita income for the county was $22,893. About 4.90% of the population and 3.40% of families were below the poverty line. Of the people living in poverty, 7.40% were under the age of 18 and 7.00% were 65 or older.

== Notable people ==
- Jamion Christian, former head coach, men's basketball, George Washington University (DC)
- Jarrell Christian, head coach, Maine Celtics
- Letitia Christian Tyler, First Lady of the United States (1841–42), first wife of President John Tyler
- Martha Washington, 1st First Lady of the United States of America, wife of 1st U.S. president, George Washington

== Education ==
New Kent County Public Schools operates the five public schools in the county. The three elementary schools are New Kent Elementary, Quinton Elementary, and George W. Watkins Elementary. The school system also includes New Kent Middle School and New Kent High School. All five schools are fully accredited by the Virginia Department of Education. At the high-school level, various honors and Advanced Placement courses are available, along with Dual enrollment through Rappahannock Community College. Gifted and enrichment programs are offered in all grades kindergarten through 12th grade.

The roughly 430 employees include 220 licensed teachers, seven guidance counselors, four media specialists, four principals, five assistant principals, and a central office staff composed of one superintendent and five directors. As of 2018, the superintendent is Brian Nichols, and the assistant superintendent is Ed Smith.

New Kent County received a new site for Rappahannock Community College in 2015, located at the renovated "historic" New Kent High School site. The site offers engineering, nursing, and basic college-level courses in New Kent.

== Transportation ==
=== Highways ===
- Interstate 64 traverses the county, with four exits (205, 211, 214, and 220), roughly paralleling U.S. 60.
- Major state highways include State Routes 30, 33, 106, 155, 249, and 273.

=== Intercity Bus ===
The Virginia Breeze intercity bus line added service to New Kent on April 20, 2026, stopping at Colonial Downs. The added service, known as the Tidewater Current, connects to the Richmond International Airport, Williamsburg, Charlottesville, Newport News, Virginia Beach, and Harrisonburg.

=== Railroads ===
- CSX Transportation
- Norfolk Southern

No passenger rail stations are in New Kent County. The nearest Amtrak service is at stations in Williamsburg and Richmond.

=== Air ===
- New Kent Airport (W96)) - near Quinton (general aviation facility)
- Commercial passenger services and cargo services are offered at Richmond International Airport - in Henrico County, about 10 miles west of Bottoms Bridge.

== Attractions ==
Two golf courses are available in New Kent County:

- The Golf Club at Brickshire
- The Club at Viniterra

The Colonial Downs horse racing track is located in rural New Kent County.

== Communities ==
No towns in New Kent County are incorporated. Unincorporated towns and communities include:

=== Census-designated place ===
- New Kent (county seat)

=== Unincorporated communities ===
- Baltimore Crossroads
- Barhamsville
- Bottoms Bridge
- Carps Corner
- Chickahominy Shores
- Crumps Mill
- Eltham
- Hampstead
- Lanexa
- Mountcastle
- Patriot's Landing (subdivision)
- Plum Point
- Poplar Grove
- Providence Forge
- Quinton
- Slaterville
- Talleysville
- Tunstall
- Walkers
- White House
- White Oak Landing
- Woodhaven Shores

== Media ==
- New Kent Charles City Chronicle, online edition
- New Kent - Charles City Chronicle: Community newspaper, published weekly
- New Kent Cablevision
- Tidewater Review, online edition

== Politics ==
New Kent County is traditionally Republican. In only one national election since 1972 has the county selected the Democratic Party candidate.

United States presidential election results for New Kent County, Virginia
Year	Republican		Democratic		Third party(ies)	
Year	No.	%	No.	%	No.	%
1912	30	12.66%	160	67.51%	47	19.83%
1916	69	26.14%	192	72.73%	3	1.14%
1920	109	36.45%	190	63.55%	0	0.00%
1924	86	30.82%	178	63.80%	15	5.38%
1928	217	54.94%	178	45.06%	0	0.00%
1932	115	28.33%	286	70.44%	5	1.23%
1936	120	28.10%	307	71.90%	0	0.00%
1940	133	31.74%	286	68.26%	0	0.00%
1944	158	32.44%	329	67.56%	0	0.00%
1948	140	27.24%	277	53.89%	97	18.87%
1952	455	52.78%	400	46.40%	7	0.81%
1956	510	57.95%	178	20.23%	192	21.82%
1960	526	51.67%	481	47.25%	11	1.08%
1964	677	49.60%	684	50.11%	4	0.29%
1968	526	27.63%	765	40.18%	613	32.20%
1972	1,370	67.52%	633	31.20%	26	1.28%
1976	1,259	47.62%	1,338	50.61%	47	1.78%
1980	1,739	57.30%	1,204	39.67%	92	3.03%
1984	2,679	68.71%	1,204	30.88%	16	0.41%
1988	2,917	66.54%	1,427	32.55%	40	0.91%
1992	2,708	49.39%	1,738	31.70%	1,037	18.91%
1996	2,852	54.15%	1,859	35.30%	556	10.56%
2000	3,934	64.34%	2,055	33.61%	125	2.04%
2004	5,414	68.13%	2,443	30.75%	89	1.12%
2008	6,385	63.91%	3,493	34.96%	113	1.13%
2012	7,246	66.16%	3,555	32.46%	152	1.39%
2016	8,118	66.31%	3,546	28.97%	578	4.72%
2020	9,631	66.59%	4,621	31.95%	211	1.46%
2024	10,974	65.29%	5,641	33.56%	192	1.14%

== See also ==
- National Register of Historic Places listings in New Kent County, Virginia
