= National Register of Historic Places listings in Charles City County, Virginia =

Location of Charles City County in Virginia

This is a list of the National Register of Historic Places listings in Charles City County, Virginia.

This is intended to be a complete list of the properties and districts on the National Register of Historic Places in Charles City County, Virginia, United States. The locations of National Register properties and districts for which the latitude and longitude coordinates are included below, may be seen in an online map.

There are 31 properties and districts listed on the National Register in the county, including 4 National Historic Landmarks. Another property was once listed but has been removed.

This National Park Service list is complete through NPS recent listings posted March 6, 2026.

== Current listings ==
| | Name on the Register | Image | Date listed | Location | City or town | Description |
|---|---|---|---|---|---|---|
| 1 | Belle Air | Belle Air | July 18, 1974 (#74002232) | North of State Route 5; 37°20′55″N 77°03′53″W | Charles City | |
| 2 | Berkeley | Berkeley | November 11, 1971 (#71001040) | Harrison Landing Rd., 8 miles (13 km) west of Charles City; 37°19′02″N 77°10′50″W | Charles City | |
| 3 | Lott Cary Birth Site | Lott Cary Birth Site | July 30, 1980 (#80004883) | Northwest of Charles City on Lott Cary Rd. 37°23′04″N 77°04′52″W | Charles City | |
| 4 | Charles City County Courthouse | Charles City County Courthouse | November 12, 1969 (#69000335) | State Route 5; 37°20′31″N 77°04′21″W | Charles City | |
| 5 | Dancing Point | Dancing Point | April 8, 2016 (#16000166) | James River off Sandy Point Rd., southeast of Charles City; 37°14′05″N 76°55′06″W | Charles City | |
| 6 | Dogham, Doggams | Dogham, Doggams | September 24, 1999 (#99001200) | 1601 Dogham Ln. 37°21′39″N 77°14′11″W | Charles City | |
| 7 | Edgewood | Edgewood | February 10, 1983 (#83003265) | West of Charles City on State Route 5; 37°19′50″N 77°11′12″W | Charles City | |
| 8 | Eppes Island | Eppes Island | November 12, 1969 (#69000337) | James River; 37°19′48″N 77°15′00″W | Hopewell | |
| 9 | Evelynton | Evelynton | August 17, 1989 (#89000486) | State Route 5 east of Barnetts Rd. 37°19′46″N 77°09′13″W | Charles City | |
| 10 | Fort Pocahontas | Fort Pocahontas | July 27, 1999 (#99000848) | Sturgeon Point Rd. 37°18′17″N 76°59′48″W | Charles City | |
| 11 | Glebe of Westover Parish | Glebe of Westover Parish | June 5, 1975 (#75002108) | Southwest of Ruthville off The Glebe Ln. 37°21′43″N 77°03′10″W | Ruthville | |
| 12 | Greenway | Greenway | November 12, 1969 (#69000336) | On State Route 5; 37°20′29″N 77°04′54″W | Charles City | |
| 13 | Hardens | Hardens | February 10, 1983 (#83003266) | West of Lamptie Hill on State Routes 5/156; 37°22′08″N 77°14′26″W | Lamptie Hill | |
| 14 | Aaron Hilton Site | | February 21, 1997 (#97000148) | Address Restricted | Charles City | |
| 15 | Kittiewan | Kittiewan | December 28, 1979 (#79003316) | 2.5 miles southeast of New Hope; 37°18′20″N 77°02′54″W | New Hope | |
| 16 | Margots | Margots | August 17, 1973 (#73002203) | Northeast of Tettington off Eagles Nest Rd. 37°18′52″N 76°53′25″W | Tettington | |
| 17 | Mica School | | February 27, 2025 (#100011466) | 11570 Wilcox Neck Road; 37°19′39″N 76°55′36″W | Charles City | |
| 18 | Mount Stirling | Mount Stirling | February 4, 1993 (#93000005) | Eastern side of State Route 155, 3,200 feet (980 m) north-northeast of its junction with Sturgeon Point Rd. 37°25′23″N 77°02′16″W | Providence Forge | |
| 19 | Nance-Major House and Store | Nance-Major House and Store | August 16, 2006 (#06000707) | 10811 Courthouse Rd. 37°20′31″N 77°04′23″W | Charles City | |
| 20 | North Bend | North Bend | August 21, 1989 (#89001107) | Weyanoke Rd. 37°18′43″N 77°03′20″W | Weyanoke | |
| 21 | Parrish Hill Rosenwald School | | February 27, 2025 (#100011467) | 12631 John Tyler Memorial Highway; 37°20′08″N 77°03′05″W | Holdcroft | |
| 22 | Piney Grove | Piney Grove | November 26, 1985 (#85003052) | The Glebe Ln. 37°22′23″N 76°58′40″W | Holdcroft | |
| 23 | Poplar Springs | Poplar Springs | August 30, 1994 (#94001028) | 17300 The Glebe Ln. 37°22′32″N 76°58′12″W | Charles City | |
| 24 | Shirley | Shirley | October 1, 1969 (#69000328) | 5 miles north of Hopewell off Westbury Farm Rd. 37°20′31″N 77°15′40″W | Hopewell | |
| 25 | John Tyler House | John Tyler House | October 15, 1966 (#66000922) | 4 miles (6.4 km) east of Charles City on State Route 5; 37°20′03″N 77°01′14″W | Charles City | |
| 26 | Upper Shirley | Upper Shirley | October 29, 1982 (#82001884) | West of Charles City on Westbury Farm Rd. 37°20′51″N 77°15′22″W | Charles City | |
| 27 | Upper Weyanoke | Upper Weyanoke | December 9, 1980 (#80004441) | South of Charles City on Weyanoke Rd. 37°17′43″N 77°04′30″W | Charles City | |
| 28 | Westover | Westover | October 15, 1966 (#66000923) | 7 miles (11 km) west of Charles City on State Route 5; 37°18′40″N 77°08′58″W | Charles City | |
| 29 | Westover Church | Westover Church | December 5, 1972 (#72001502) | 5 miles (8.0 km) west of Charles City off State Route 5; 37°19′53″N 77°09′32″W | Charles City | |
| 30 | Weyanoke | Weyanoke | March 10, 1980 (#80004406) | Weyanoke Rd. off State Route 5; 37°17′26″N 77°03′54″W | Charles City | |
| 31 | Woodburn | Woodburn | December 12, 1978 (#78003183) | Northwest of Charles City on Adkins Rd. 37°21′23″N 77°06′38″W | Charles City | |

== Former listing ==
| | Name on the Register | Image | Date listed | Date removed | Location | City or town | Description |
|---|---|---|---|---|---|---|---|
| 1 | The Rowe | | March 28, 1980 (#80004442) | June 4, 2008 | 3 miles southwest of Rustic; 37°15′17″N 76°57′43″W | Rustic | |

== See also ==
- List of National Historic Landmarks in Virginia
- National Register of Historic Places listings in Virginia
