= Dancing Point =

Historic house in Virginia, United States

- U.S. National Register of Historic Places
- U.S. Historic district
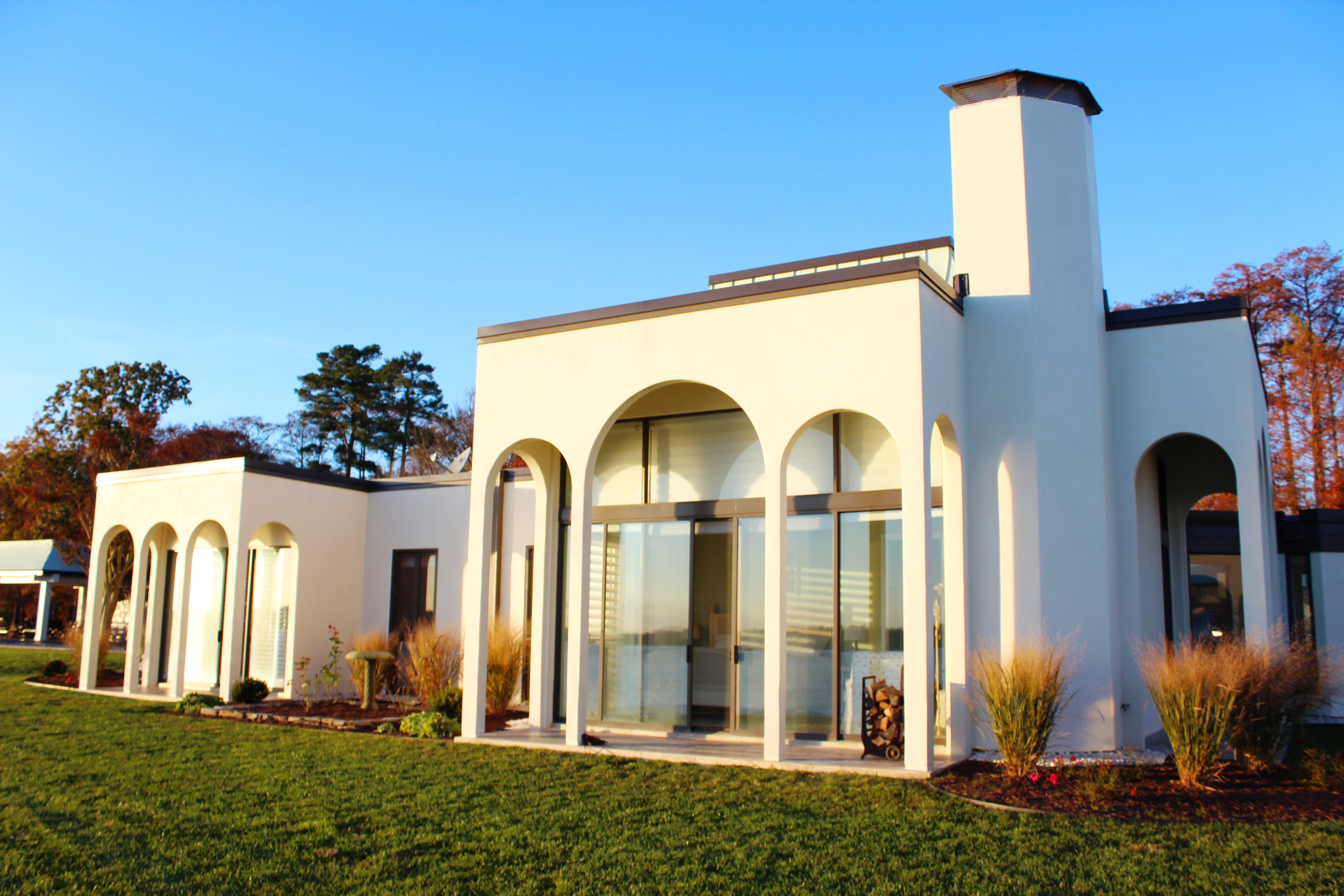
- Dancing Point house, seen in 2015

- Location within Virginia Location within the United States
- Location: Off Sandy Point Rd., near Rustic, Virginia
- Coordinates: 37°14′5″N 76°55′6″W
- Area: 146 acres (59 ha)
- Built: 1619-c. 1800; 1973-76
- Architect: Thomas Church; Robert Stewart
- NRHP reference No.: 16000166
- Added to NRHP: April 8, 2016

Dancing Point is a historic property on the north bank of the James River in rural Charles City County, Virginia. Located off Sandy Point Road and projecting into the river, the property has archaeological sites dating to the early colonial period of Virginia's history that may shed light on the interaction between the early settlers of nearby Jamestown and the surrounding Native American communities; it is known to be the site of the 1619 Smith's Hundred settlement. The property is more recently notable for a Post-Modern landscape design by Thomas Church, executed in the 1970s, that is believed to be his only surviving commission in the state. A house from the same period was designed by Robert W. Stewart.

== History ==
The legend of Dancing Point dates back to the 1700s. Philip Lightfoot II, an affluent merchant, had dancing contests against the devil here, originally a place near the river, where no trees or grass would grow, alluded to the alleged fact that the devil danced here, trampling any small plants.

The property was added to the National Register of Historic Places in 2016.

== See also ==
- National Register of Historic Places listings in Charles City County, Virginia
