= Upper Weyanoke =

Historic house in Virginia, United States

- U.S. National Register of Historic Places
- Virginia Landmarks Register
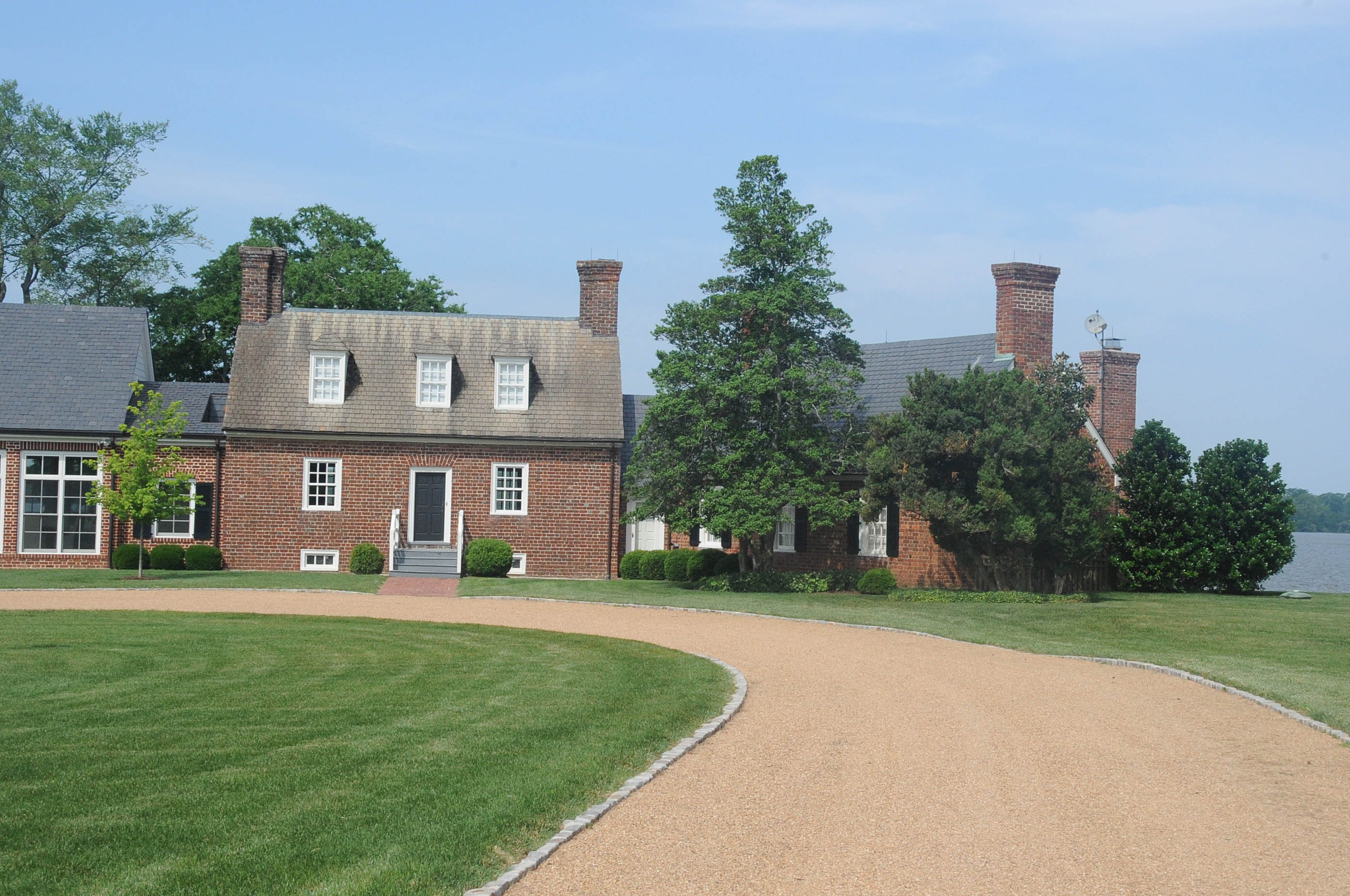

- Location within Virginia Location within the United States
- Location: S. of Charles City on VA 619, Charles City, Virginia
- Coordinates: 37°17′54″N 77°04′25″W
- Area: 110 acres (45 ha)
- Built: 1815, 1858-1859
- Architectural style: Greek Revival
- NRHP reference No.: 80004441
- VLR No.: 018-0014

Significant dates
- Added to NRHP: December 9, 1980
- Designated VLR: September 16, 1980

Upper Weyanoke is a historic plantation house close to Charles City, Charles City County, Virginia. The property contains a one-and-a-half-story cottage built in about 1815, and a larger two-story Greek Revival style residence erected in 1858–59. The cottage was probably built by John Minge as a two-room dependency to a now-vanished main dwelling. The main house was built for Robert Douthat, and is a two-story brick dwelling with a side-hall plan typically utilized in urban homes, rather than rural plantation houses.

The house was added to the National Register of Historic Places in 1980.
