= Glebe of Westover Parish =

Historic house in Virginia, United States

- U.S. National Register of Historic Places
- Virginia Landmarks Register
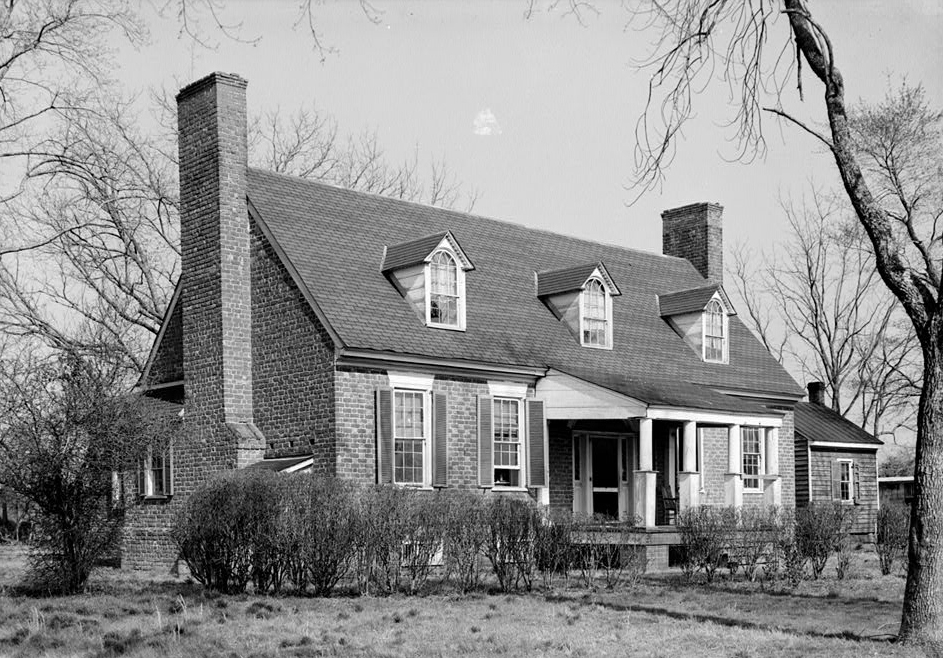

- Location within Virginia Location within the United States
- Location: SW of Ruthville off VA 615, near Ruthville, Virginia
- Coordinates: 37°21′43″N 77°03′13″W
- Area: 96 acres (39 ha)
- Built: c. 1745
- Architectural style: Colonial, Federal
- NRHP reference No.: 75002108
- VLR No.: 018-0009

Significant dates
- Added to NRHP: June 5, 1975
- Designated VLR: July 17, 1973

Glebe of Westover Parish is a historic home located near Ruthville, Charles City County, Virginia. It built about 1745, as a 1 1/2-story, five-bay brick building, with an early 19th-century rear ell. It reflects Colonial and Federal style design elements. It also has an early 20th-century, one-story, frame wing. It was built as a glebe house for Westover Parish. The house was sold into private hands after the 1807 act of the General Assembly requiring the sale of all Virginia glebes.

It was added to the National Register of Historic Places in 1975.
