= Aaron Hilton Site =

Archaeological site in Virginia, United States

- U.S. National Register of Historic Places
- Virginia Landmarks Register
- Nearest city: Charles City, Virginia
- Area: 0.1 acres (0.040 ha)
- Built: c. 1870-1877
- NRHP reference No.: 97000148
- VLR No.: 018-0246

Significant dates
- Added to NRHP: February 21, 1997
- Designated VLR: December 4, 1996

The Aaron Hilton Site is a historic archaeological site located near Charles City, Charles City County, Virginia. The site includes the remains of a simple house built between 1870 and 1877 for Aaron Hilton, a respected former slave.

It was added to the National Register of Historic Places in 1997.
