= William Lightfoot (burgess) =

Member of the Virginia House of Burgesses representing Charles City County
- In office 1756-1758 Serving with Benjamin Harrison
- Preceded by: Richard Kennon
- Succeeded by: William Kennon

Personal details
- Born: 1724 James City County, Colony of Virginia
- Died: June 10, 1764 (aged 39–40) Sandy Point plantation, Charles City County, Colony of VirginiaS
- Resting place: Teddington cemetery, Sandy Point, Charles City County, Colony of Virginia
- Spouse: Mildred Howell
- Children: 5
- Parent(s): Philip Lightfoot, Mary Armistead Burwell
- Occupation: Planter, politician

Military service
- Branch/service: Virginia militia
- Rank: major

William Lightfoot (1724 – June 10, 1764) was a Virginia merchant and planter who represented James City County for a decade in the House of Burgesses.

== Early life ==
Although sources differ as to whether this boy was born in 1620, 1622 or 1624, This William Lightfoot was the son of the widowed Mary Armistead Burwell and her second husband, wealthy Yorktown merchant Philip Lightfoot II (1689-May 30, 1748). His father became the clerk of York County in 1707 and in 1733 (during this boy's childhood) a member of the Governor's Council (on which he remained until near his death). His maternal grandfather was William Armistead of what became Charles City County. The Virginia branch of the Lightfoot family had begun a generation earlier, when John and Philip Lightfoot, grandsons of Rev. Richard Lightfoot of Stoke Bruerne, and sons of a Northamptonshire barrister named John Lightfoot, emigrated from England to developing Gloucester County. In 1670 John Lightfoot became Auditor General of Virginia. Though that position only lasted a year, he ultimately became captain of the local militia. In 1671 his brother Philip (this man's grandfather) became a justice of the peace in Gloucester County and ultimately lieutenant colonel of the county militia, as well as the county surveyor. Either that Philip Lightfoot moved from the York River watershed to the nearby James River watershed, or had multiple residences, for he became justice of the peace for James City County (immediately west of York County) and tax collector for the Upper District of the James River. That position may have caused Lightfoot's significant losses in Bacon's Rebellion, during which rebels also imprisoned him, but he survived for another three decades. Grandfather Lightfoot married Alice Corbin of Buckingham House in Middlesex County (west of Gloucester County), the daughter of powerful planter Henry Corbin. His will, dated 1708, left Sandy Point plantation (then in Wallingford parish of James City County but soon to become Westover Parish in Charles City County when that new county was added to the west) to his eldest son Francis, but specified that if Francis had no heirs, to his brother Philip (this man's father). Francis' son died as a child, and his daughter Elizabeth married planter Beverly Randolph. Despite that provision in his father's will, Francis Lightfoot bequeathed Sandy Point to his brother Philip, who paid Elizabeth (or her husband) 2,500 pounds sterling in compensation, which act the colonial legislature ratified in 1740. This boy was raised with stepbrother Nathaniel Bacon Burwell, although his stepsister Lucy died as an infant.

== Career ==
This William Lightfoot served as sheriff of York County (which encompasses half of Williamsburg as well as Yorktown) in 1746. Between 1709 and 1743, his father had bought many lots in Yorktown, as well as land suitable for plantations in several Counties.

Charles City County voters elected Lightfoot as their (part-time) representative in the House of Burgesses in 1756 to replace William Kennon, who returned to the seat in the next election. He also served on the Board of Visitors for the College of William & Mary in Williamsburg.

== Personal life ==
He married Mary Howell (1723-1783). The marriage produced at least two sons and two daughters. William Lightfoot Jr. inherited the Charles City County and James City County property, and continued the family's political traditions by serving in the Virginia House of Delegates for a decade. Their second son, Philip Lightfoot (d.1786), who became a lieutenant in Harrison's artillery in the Continental line, received two land grants. That Philip Lightfoot (III) married Mary Warner Lewis, the only daughter of Col. Charles Lewis (descended from powerful planter Augustine Warner of Gloucester County) and his wife Lucy Taliaferro, and as an adult lived at Cedar Creek plantation in Caroline County (significantly northwest of the family's original holdings in Gloucester County). Their sister Mary married burgess William Allen of Surry County, and Mildred Allen married Walter Coles, the son of Henrico county merchant John Coles, who had immigrated from Ireland.

== Death and legacy ==
Lightfoot died on June 10, 1764, and was buried at the family's graveyard at Teddington in the Sandy Point area of Charles City County. His widow survived him by nearly two decades.

His papers, including account books (1747-1764), are held by the John D. Rockefeller Jr. Library of the Colonial Williamsburg Foundation. His Williamsburg house on Duke of Gloucester Street (among other town lots owned by him) remained owned by descendants until the middle of the 19th century, when it was acquired by lawyer George Southall, who later sold it to lawyer William S. Peachy, who operated a law office and whose descendants owned it until 1888.
