= Nance-Major House and Store =

Historic house in Virginia, United States

- U.S. National Register of Historic Places
- Virginia Landmarks Register
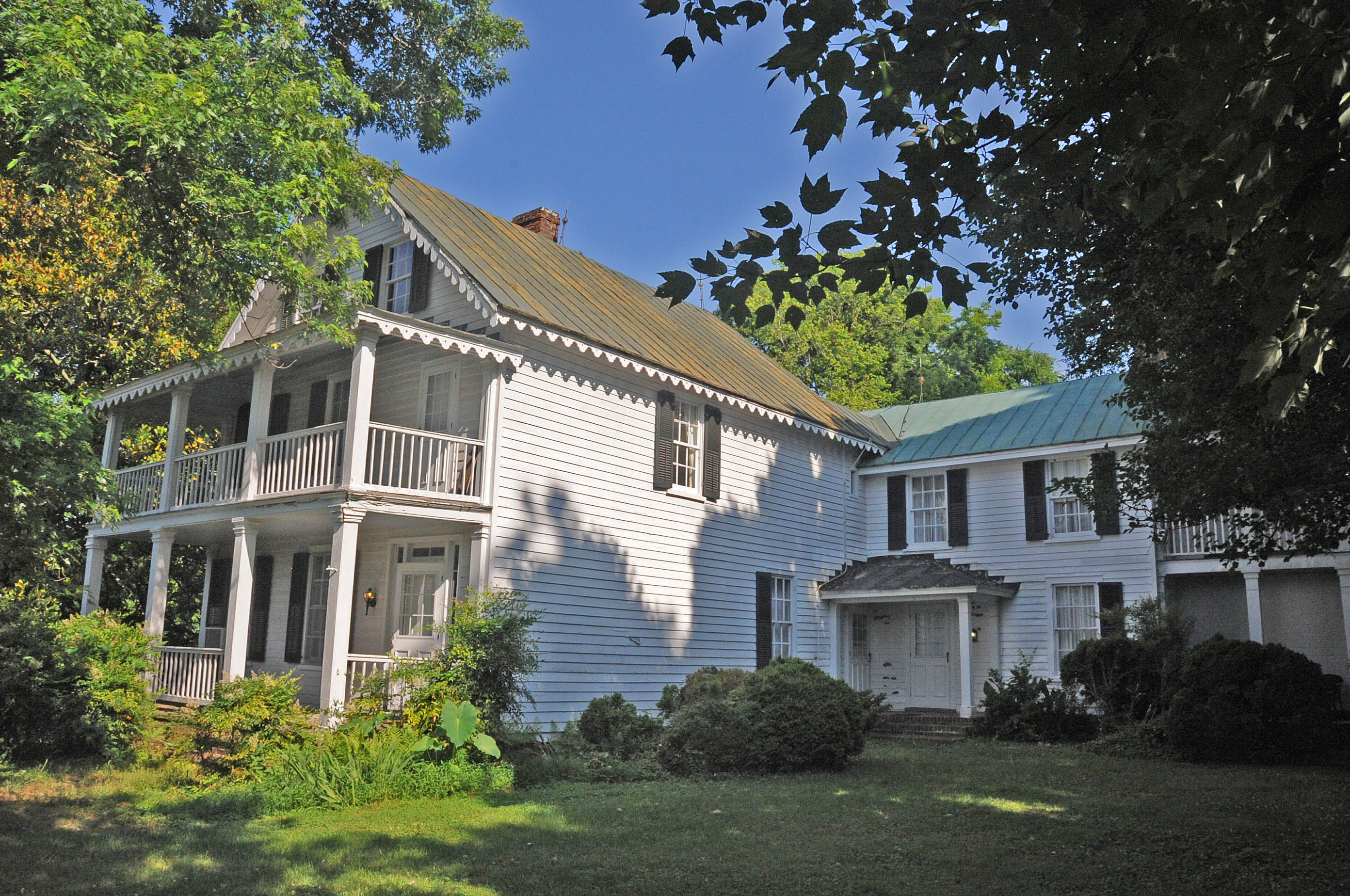

- Location within Virginia Location within the United States
- Location: 10811 Courthouse Rd., Charles City, Virginia
- Coordinates: 37°20′39″N 77°04′25″W
- Area: 7.7 acres (3.1 ha)
- Built: 1869, 1872
- Built by: Nance, Benjamin Albert; Nance-Major, Edward and Julia
- Architectural style: Greek Revival
- NRHP reference No.: 06000707
- VLR No.: 018-0078

Significant dates
- Added to NRHP: August 16, 2006
- Designated VLR: June 18, 2006

Nance-Major House and Store is a historic home and country store located across from the Charles City County Courthouse in Charles City, Virginia, United States. The Nance-Major Store, built around 1872, is a two-story, three-bay, gable-front frame building supported by a brick pier foundation. The Nance-Major House was built about 1869, and is an L-shaped, 2 1/2-story, post-and-beam-frame dwelling covered with painted horizontal weatherboard. It features a steeply pitched, front-gabled roof and a two-story, three-bay, full-width porch. Additional structures on the property include a contributing smokehouse, a grain barn, a tool shed, and a garage. The store was in operation from 1874 until 1963.

The Nance-Major House and Store was added to the National Register of Historic Places in 2006.
