= Poplar Springs (Virginia) =

Historic house in Virginia, United States

- U.S. National Register of Historic Places
- Virginia Landmarks Register
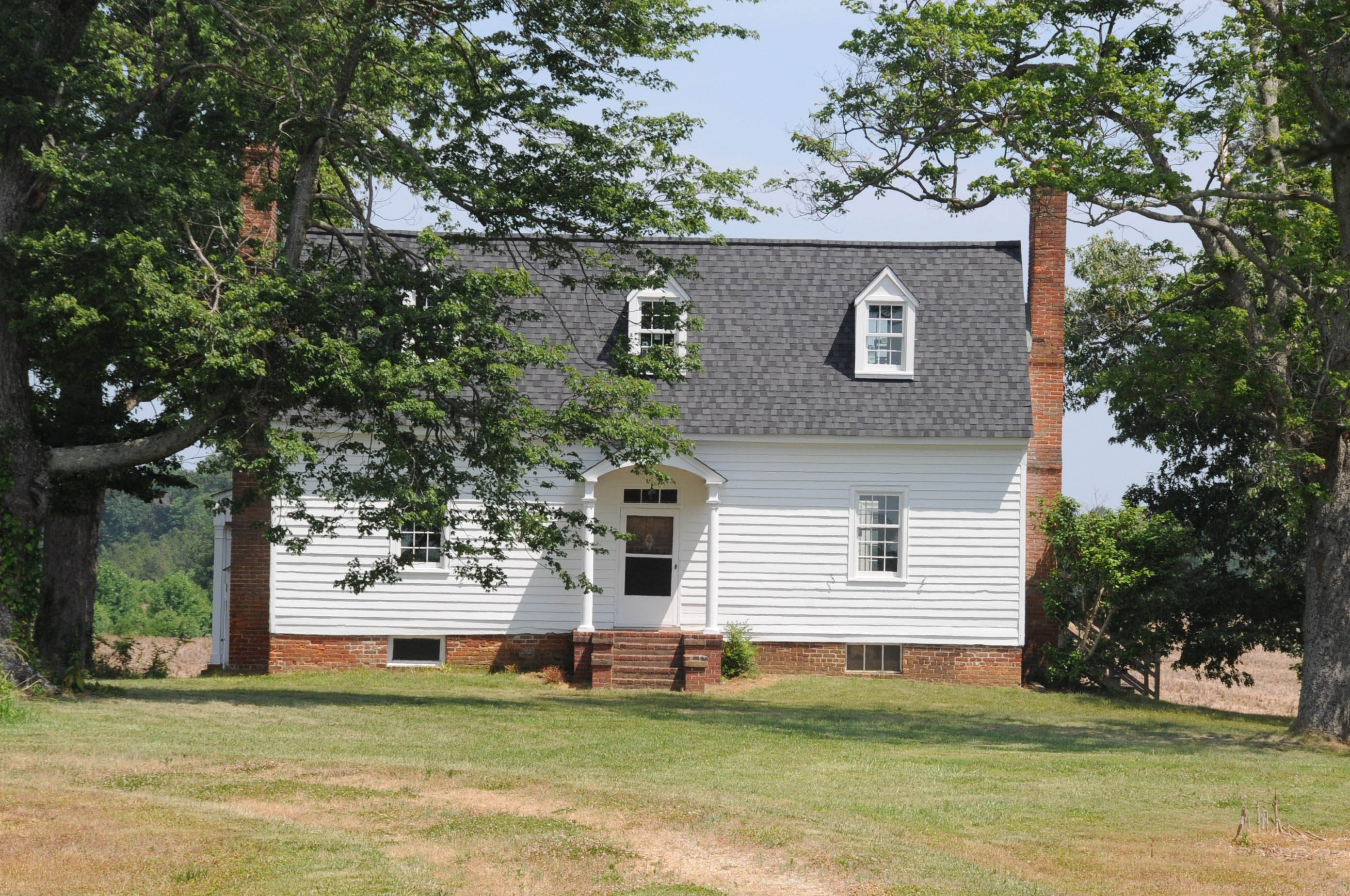

- Location within Virginia Location within the United States
- Location: 17300 The Glebe Ln., Charles City, Virginia
- Coordinates: 37°22′40″N 76°58′15″W
- Area: 91 acres (37 ha)
- Built: 1809, 1840–1844
- Architectural style: Center-passage plan
- NRHP reference No.: 94001028
- VLR No.: 018-0018

Significant dates
- Added to NRHP: August 30, 1994
- Designated VLR: March 10, 1994

Poplar Springs is a historic home located near Charles City, Charles City County, Virginia. The original section was built in 1809, and expanded in 1840–1844. It is a 1 1/2-story, three-bay, frame dwelling with a center-passage plan. It has a gable roof and brick chimney. It is representative of vernacular Tidewater Virginia architecture.

It was added to the National Register of Historic Places in 1994.
