= Woodburn (Charles City, Virginia) =

Historic house in Virginia, United States

- U.S. National Register of Historic Places
- Virginia Landmarks Register
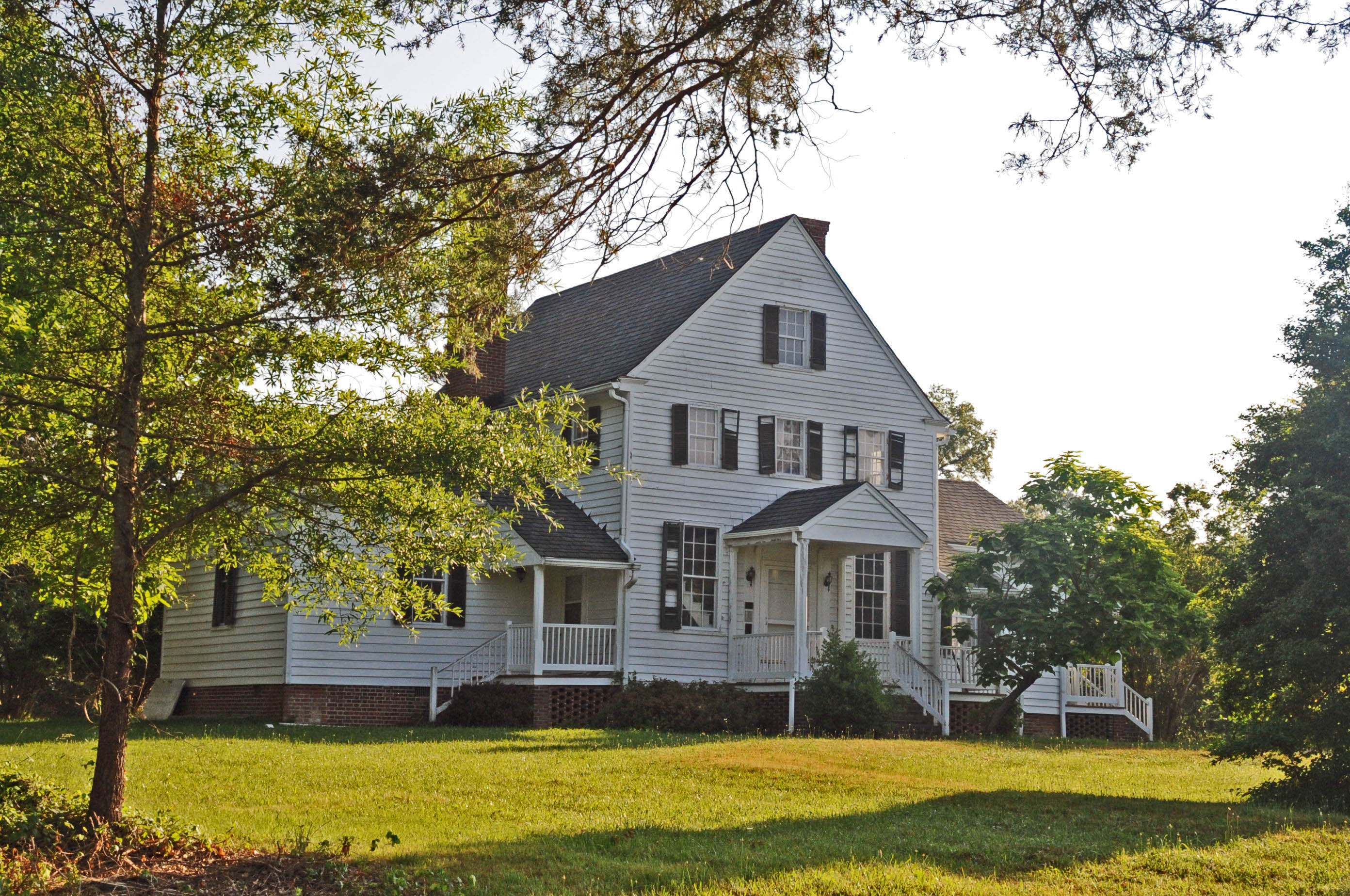

- Location within Virginia Location within the United States
- Location: NW of Charles on VA 618, Charles City, Virginia
- Coordinates: 37°21′20″N 77°06′39″W
- Area: 60 acres (24 ha)
- Built: c. 1815
- Architectural style: Palladian
- NRHP reference No.: 78003183
- VLR No.: 018-0052

Significant dates
- Added to NRHP: December 12, 1978
- Designated VLR: April 19, 1977

Woodburn, also known as Woodbourne, is a historic plantation house located near Charles City, Charles City County, Virginia. The house was built about 1815 by John Tyler, who later served as tenth President of the United States. The Palladian house is a three-part frame structure consisting of a tall, two-story, three-bay central section with a gable-end facade and flanking chimneys, and two, low one-story, one-bay wings. Also on the property are a contributing one-story frame office (c. 1830) and an original smokehouse. The Woodburn property was purchased by John Tyler in 1813 when he married Letitia Christian. He resided there until 1821, and sold the property to his brother Wat H. Tyler in 1831. During his residence at Woodburn, he served as Congressman.

It was added to the National Register of Historic Places in 1978.
