= James Bradby =

American law enforcement officer (1929–1968)

- Born: James Nemo Bradby; October 4, 1929; Charles City, Virginia, US
- Died: March 24, 1968 (aged 38); Charles City, Virginia, US
- Known for: First African-American Sheriff of Charles City County

James Nemo Bradby (October 4, 1929 – March 24, 1968) was an American law enforcement officer. In 1967, he was elected as the first African-American sheriff in the state of Virginia since the Reconstruction Era. He died by suicide fewer than three months later.

Bradby was born in Charles City, Virginia, shortly before the onset of the Great Depression. He was the third-born child and second son of Samuel Bradby, a farmhand, and Arnella Cotman, who had at least six children.

The Voting Rights Act of 1965 outlawed a number of devices that segregationist Southern state governments had used since the Jim Crow Era to disenfranchise African Americans. For the first time since Reconstruction, African Americans were able to visit the polls in large numbers, giving their own candidates a chance at office. Charles City County was 75% African American, and on November 7, 1967, the county elected an African American sheriff (Bradby) and county clerk (Iona W. Adkins) for the first time in Virginia's modern history. Bradby ran as an independent and defeated M.D. Lampkin, a Democrat who had served as sheriff for 43 years, longer than Bradby's own lifetime. Bradby and Adkins took office on January 1, 1968.

At the time, Bradby was one of only two African American sheriffs in the entire United States. Friends reported that Bradby felt intense pressure to represent his race in his new position, and became despondent at what he saw as his failure to live up to the challenge. On Sunday, March 24, 1968, he left his home and died by suicide by carbon monoxide poisoning, running a hose from his tailpipe into his car. He was 38 years old. The possibility of foul play was ruled out by the lack of marks on his body, the fact that the hose and masking tape he had used to seal the car came from his own garage, the fact that the car was tightly sealed from the inside, and by the lack of Ku Klux Klan activity in the mostly African-American county.

Bradby was remembered as a conscientious and well-liked sheriff despite the brevity of his tenure, including by his predecessor M.D. Lampkin. One newspaper described him as "a symbol to members of his race of their increasing political strength in the South".
