= Philip Lightfoot II =

Colonial Virginia public official and merchant

Maj. Gen. Philip Lightfoot II

Representative to the Council of Colonial Virginia
- In office 1733–1748

Clerk of Court for York County, Virginia
- In office 1707–1733

Personal details
- Born: 1689 Yorktown, Colony of Virginia, Colonial North America
- Died: 30 May 1748 (aged 58–59) Charles City, Colony of Virginia, Colonial North America
- Spouse: Mary Armistead
- Parent(s): Maj. Col. Philip Lightfoot I Alice Corbin
- Occupation: planter, militia officer, politician, merchant
- Nickname: The Merchant Prince

Military service
- Rank: Major Colonel; Major General

Major General Philip Lightfoot II was an American tobacco merchant, militia leader, and politician in the eighteenth century. He served as the commander of Militia in and around York County, Virginia, serving as a Major General. A legend about either him or his son became popular folk lore surrounding Dancing Point. The story is that Philip Lightfoot won a dance contest against the Devil, who was jealous of his skill and fortune in life.

== Early life & Family ==
Philip Lightfoot II was born in 1689 to Philip Lightfoot I and Alice Corbin. His maternal grandfather was Henry Corbin and his paternal 2nd great-grandfather was Rev. John Lightfoot, who was rector of Stoke Bruene, in England. He married Mary Armistead, and the two of them would have ten children together, including William Lightfoot, John Lightfoot, and Philip Lightfoot III. He inherited from his father the role of regional Militia leader.

== Mercantile career ==
Philip Lightfoot became extremely wealthy off of tobacco exports out of Yorktown, Virginia. He made so much money people called him the "Merchant Prince". He owned many, many, plantations in several counties, making him among the wealthiest men in the Colony of Virginia at the time. He also owned storehouses in Williamsburg, Virginia, where he would prepare tobacco for transatlantic transport.

== Political career ==
He served for over 20 years as Clerk of Court for York County, Virginia and was also appointed to serve on the Council of Colonial Virginia, one of the highest positions in the colony. He also was a trade agent for the Public Storehouse at Yorktown, serving as a trade official.

== Later life and Legacy ==
Philip Lightfoot II died in 1748 at his estate in Charles City, Virginia. His 10 children gave him many grandchildren to where today he has thousands upon thousands of descendants. His house in Williamsburg, Virginia is a prominent house stop on the ghost tour.
