= Mount Sterling =

Mount Sterling may refer to the following places in the United States:

== Communities ==
- Mount Sterling, Alabama, an unincorporated community
- Mount Sterling, Illinois, a city and county seat
- Mount Sterling, Indiana, an unincorporated community
- Mount Sterling, Iowa, a city
- Mount Sterling, Kentucky, a home rule-class city
- Mount Sterling, Missouri, an unincorporated community
- Mount Sterling, Ohio, a village
- Mount Sterling, Wisconsin, a village
- Mount Sterling Township, Brown County, Illinois

== Mountains ==
- Mount Sterling (Great Smoky Mountains), a mountain in North Carolina and Tennessee

== See also ==
- Mount Stirling, a mountain, Victoria, Australia
- Mount Stirling (Antarctica), a mountain in the Bowers Mountains, Antarctica
- Mount Stirling (Providence Forge, Virginia), a historic house in the United States
