= Greenway Plantation =

Historic house in Virginia, United States

- Greenway
- U.S. National Register of Historic Places
- Virginia Landmarks Register
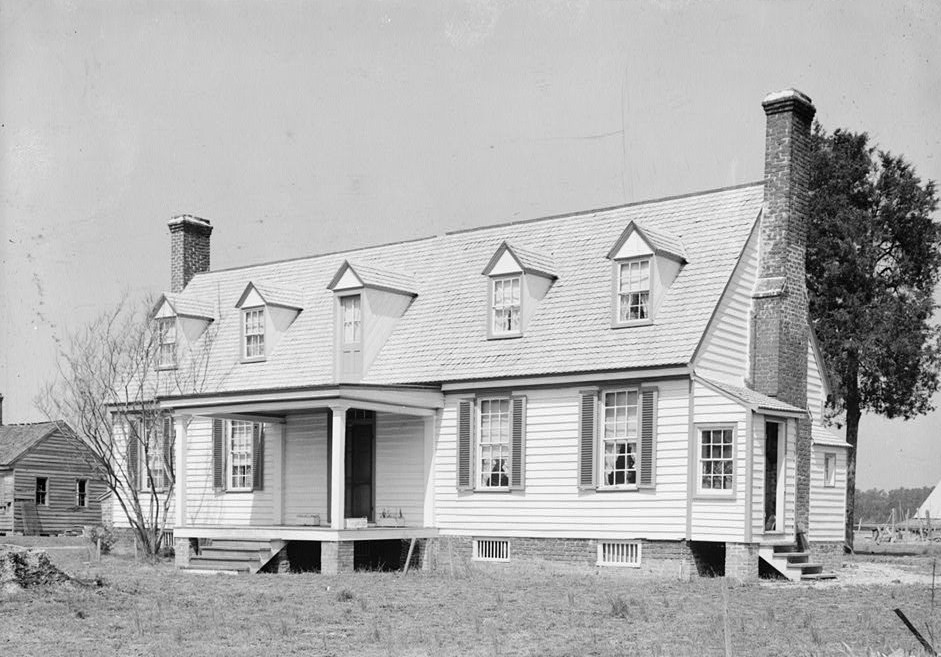
- Greenway

- Location within Virginia Location within the United States
- Location: Greenway, Charles City County, Virginia
- Coordinates: 37°21′15″N 77°6′6″W
- Area: 0 acres (0 ha)
- Built: 1775; 251 years ago
- NRHP reference No.: 69000336
- VLR No.: 018-0010

Significant dates
- Added to NRHP: November 12, 1969
- Designated VLR: September 9, 1969

Greenway Plantation is a wood-frame, 1 1/2-story plantation house in Charles City County, Virginia. Historic Route 5 and the Virginia Capital Trail bikeway, both of which connect Williamsburg and Richmond pass to slightly south of this private home. Located just west of the county seat Charles City Courthouse, Virginia, Greenway is one of Charles City's earliest and most distinctive Colonial plantations. It was added to the National Register of Historic Places in 1969. Other Virginia historic sites built in the same era and with similar names are considerably west: Greenway Court, Virginia, built in 1747 and mostly demolished in the 1830s, now in Clarke County (which had been the seat of Lord Fairfax, who inherited the Northern Neck Proprietary and was an employer and friend of George Washington and the only British nobleman to live in Virginia during the American Revolutionary War), and Greenway (Madison Mills, Virginia) a house built circa 1780 for Francis Madison, the brother of President James Madison.

== Physical description ==
The plantation comprises approximately 1,100 acres (4.5 km^{2}) and consists of several outbuildings in addition to the main house. The frame structures have beaded clapboard siding and wood-covered gable rooflines. The main structure is symmetrical in its front, southern facade and possesses the end chimneys so characteristic of southern Colonial structures. It has a unique T-shaped plan and the brick foundation walls are constructed mainly of Flemish bond, with the exception of a few areas where an English brick bond is possible evidence of additions.

== History ==
Greenway was built circa 1776 by Judge John Tyler Sr., the father of President John Tyler. Future President Tyler was born here in 1790. When Judge Tyler died in 1813, John Tyler at the age of 23 inherited Greenway. He lived there until age 39 in 1829, when he sold the plantation and moved to nearby Sherwood Forest Plantation. Although its architecture has significance, the historical colonial and federal figures associated with the plantation are the most notable facts about it.

The plantation was home to as many as 16 enslaved individuals.

== Present use ==
The plantation is privately owned and maintained. The structures have remained well-preserved over the years with little alteration; they have been measured, photographed, and drawn for preservation by the Historic American Buildings Survey of the Library of Congress.
