= Edgewood Plantation and Harrison's Mill =

Historic house in Virginia, United States

- Edgewood
- U.S. National Register of Historic Places
- Virginia Landmarks Register
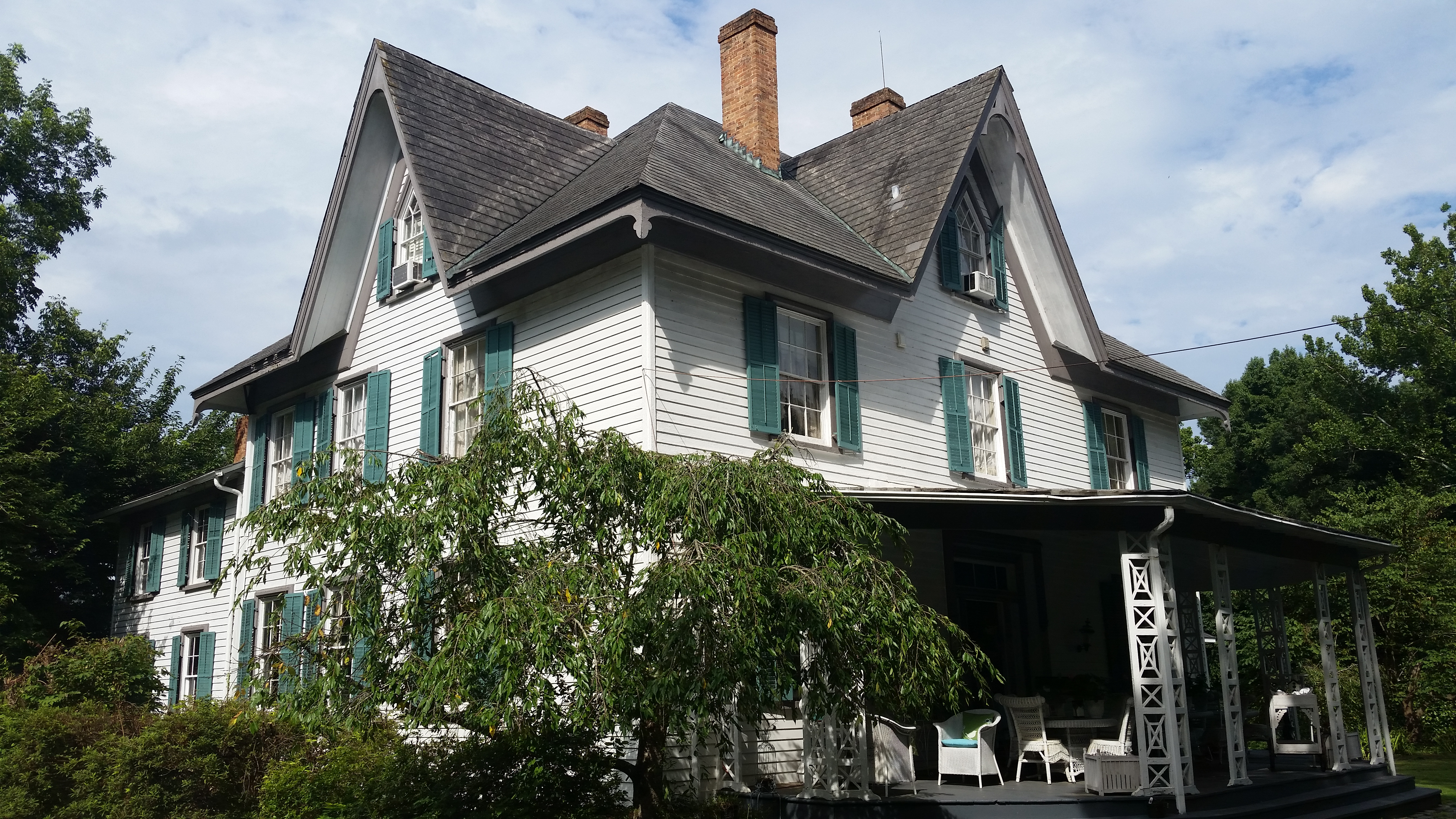

- Location within Virginia Location within the United States
- Location: W. of Charles City on VA 5, Charles City, Virginia
- Coordinates: 37°19′49″N 77°11′12″W
- Area: 4 acres (1.6 ha)
- Built: 1854
- Architectural style: Gothic Cottage
- NRHP reference No.: 83003265
- VLR No.: 018-0058

Significant dates
- Added to NRHP: February 10, 1983
- Designated VLR: December 14, 1982

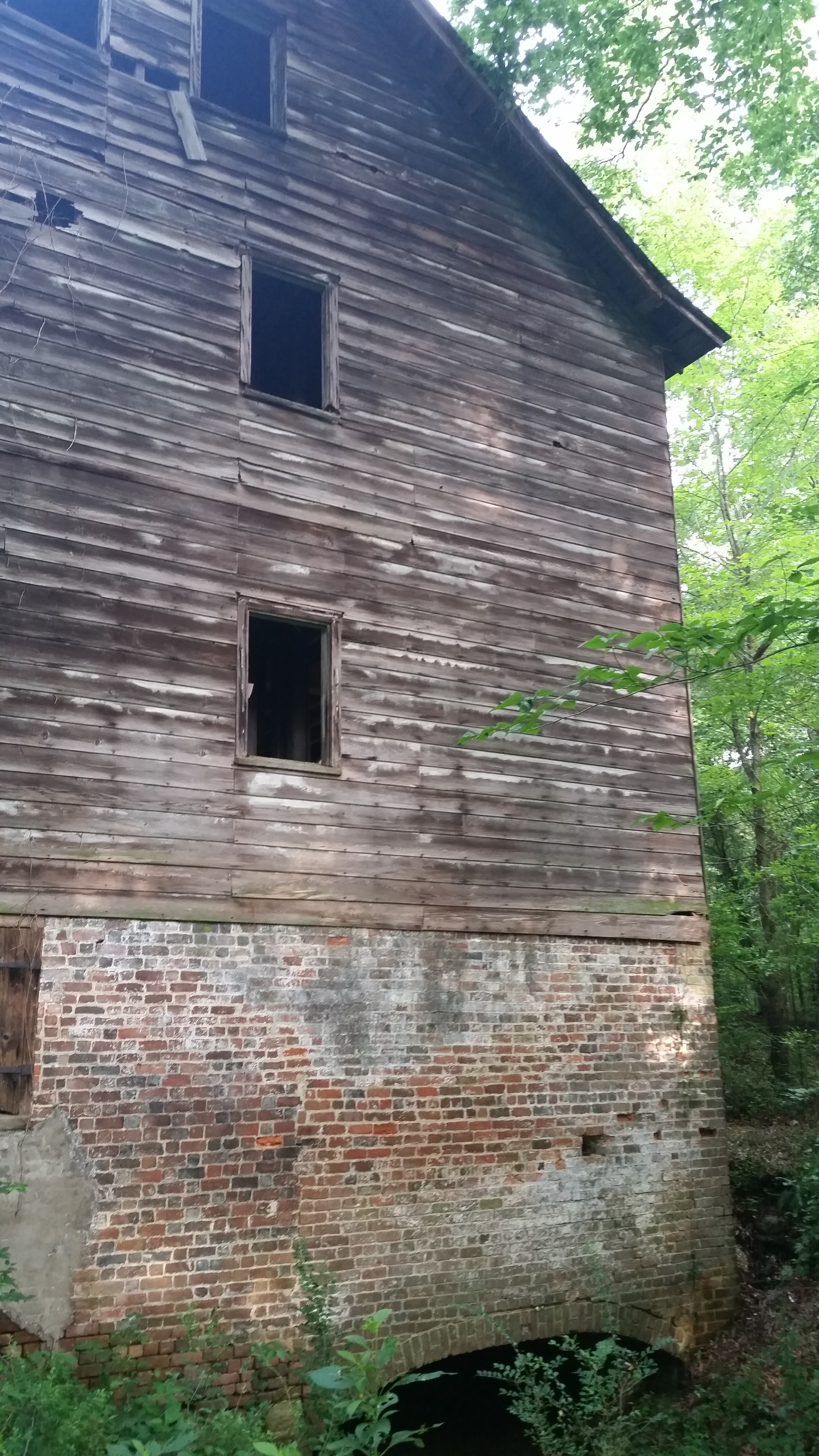
Harrison Mill at Edgewood Plantation

Edgewood Plantation is an estate located north of the James River in Charles City County, Virginia. It is located along State Route 5, a scenic byway which runs between the independent cities of Richmond and Williamsburg. Edgewood was listed on the National Register of Historic Places in 1982.

== Construction ==
Circa 1849, Edgewood Plantation is an exquisite 7,000 square foot example of Gothic Revival architecture. Edgewood, once part of the grounds of Berkeley Plantation, is the sole example of Gothic Revival architecture found along the James River. The traditional center hall plan of the house provides the setting for a three-story stairway, which occupies the space beneath four steeply pitched gables. The house was built around 1854 for Richard S. Rowland who moved to Charles City County from New Jersey to operate the gristmill on the property.

== The Mill ==
Rowland's Mill was built during the 18th century by Benjamin Harrison V of Berkeley Plantation. It was visited during the Civil War by General J.E.B. Stuart and during the American Revolutionary War by British troops led by Benedict Arnold.

== Civil War history ==
During the American Civil War the third floor of Edgewood was used as a lookout post for Confederate generals when their troops were camped at nearby Berkeley and the gristmill ground corn for both the Union and Confederate armies. On June 15, 1862, Confederate General J.E.B. Stuart stopped at Edgewood for refreshment on his way to Richmond to warn General Robert E. Lee of the Union Army's strength.

== Subsequent history ==
In the early 1900s, Edgewood became Charles City County's first restaurant, The Blue Tea Pot. Edgewood currently rents rooms as a bed and breakfast, and offers Victorian high teas and special themed tours.

== Visitation ==
The grounds are open daily from 9:00 a.m. to 5:00 p.m. daily and guided tours of the house are available daily by appointment.

== See also ==
- List of James River plantations
