= Charles City Shire =

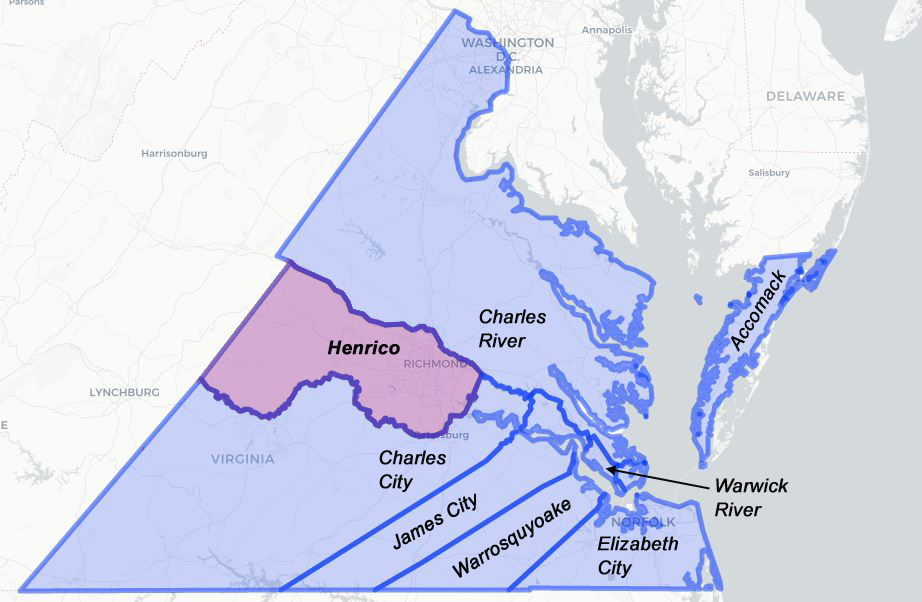
Map of the shires of Virginia, 1634

Charles City Shire was formed in 1634 in the colony of Virginia. It was named for Charles I, the then King of England, and was renamed Charles City County in 1637.

== History ==
During the 17th century, shortly after the establishment of the settlement at Jamestown in 1607, English settlers explored and began settling the areas adjacent to Hampton Roads.

On, November 18, 1618, the Virginia Company of London, proprietor of the colony, gave instructions on the formation of a laudable government for the Colony to Sir George Yeardley when he departed from London to become full governor of Virginia. As directed, in 1619, Governor Yeardley established four large corporations, termed citties (sic), which were designated to encompass the developed portion of the colony. These were Kecoughtan (later renamed Elizabeth Cittie), James Cittie, Charles Cittie, and Henrico Cittie.

By 1634, by order of Charles I, eight shires were formed with a total population of approximately 5,000 inhabitants. By 1643, these shires had been renamed as counties.

Charles City Shire originally extended to both sides of the James River, and Charles City Point on the south side later became known simply as City Point, in an area subdivided to form Prince George County. City Point later became part of the independent city of Hopewell in 1923.

In 2005, Charles City County is considered one of only five shires in Virginia still extant, having remained essentially the same political entity as it was when originally formed.
