= John Tyler Sr. =

American judge (1747–1813)

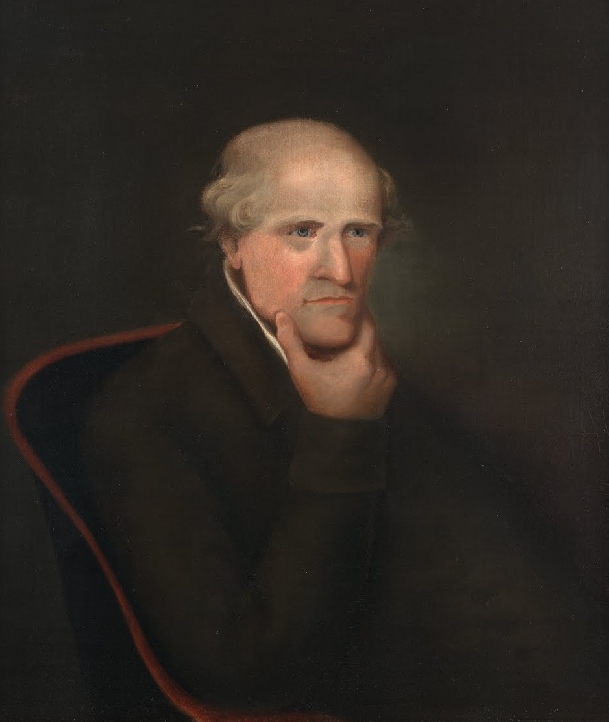
- Posthumous portrait, c. 1873

Judge of the United States District Court for the District of Virginia
- In office January 7, 1811 – January 6, 1813
- Appointed by: James Madison
- Preceded by: Cyrus Griffin
- Succeeded by: St. George Tucker

15th Governor of Virginia
- In office December 1, 1808 – January 15, 1811
- Preceded by: William H. Cabell
- Succeeded by: James Monroe

Speaker of the Virginia House of Delegates
- In office 1781–1785
- Preceded by: Benjamin Harrison V
- Succeeded by: Benjamin Harrison V

Member of the Virginia House of Delegates from Charles City County
- In office May 4, 1778 – October 15, 1786 Serving with Benjamin Harrison, William Green Munford, Henry Southall
- Preceded by: William Acrill
- Succeeded by: William Christian

Personal details
- Born: John Tyler; February 28, 1747 James City County, Virginia, British America
- Died: January 6, 1813 (aged 65) Charles City County, Virginia, United States
- Spouse: Mary Marot Armistead (m. 1777; death 1797)
- Children: 8, including: Martha; John; Christiana
- Education: College of William & Mary
- Profession: Lawyer; judge

John Tyler Sr. (February 28, 1747 – January 6, 1813) was an American lawyer, planter, politician and judge who served in the Virginia House of Delegates and became 15th Governor of Virginia and later United States district judge of the United States District Court for the District of Virginia. He was the father of U.S. President John Tyler.

== Early life and education ==
Born on February 28, 1747, in James City County, Colony of Virginia, British America, to Anne Contesse and her husband John Tyler, the marshal of the Colony's vice-admiralty court. His maternal grandfather was Huguenot physician Dr. Louis Contesse. Beginning in 1754, Tyler attended first the grammar school at the College of William & Mary in the colony's capitol, Williamsburg, then the college itself. When he was nineteen, Tyler stood in the lobby of the colony's assembly, the House of Burgesses, and listened to Patrick Henry's speech concerning the Stamp Act 1765, which caused him both to become hostile to the British government, as well as to read law with eminent attorney Robert Carter Nicholas.

== Career ==
Tyler was admitted to the Virginia bar and had a private legal practice. Around 1770, Tyler moved to Charles City County. There, in addition to his private legal practice, Tyler operated plantations using enslaved labor. By his marriage in 1776, discussed below, Tyler built Greenway Plantation, where he would raise his family and later die. In the 1787 Virginia tax census, Tyler owned 20 enslaved adults and 14 enslaved children, as well as 12 horses and 75 cattle, and was also taxed for his carriages (which had a total of six wheels). Meanwhile, as relations with Britain became strained, Tyler became a member of the Charles City County Committee of Safety. In 1775, he raised a company of troops. He joined his forces with those led by Patrick Henry to demand the restoration of the gunpowder Virginia's governor Lord Dunmore had removed from the government magazine in Williamsburg, or else compensation. In 1776 Tyler accepted a one-year appointment as commissioner in admiralty.

Tyler's statewide political career began in 1778, as he first won election as one of Charles City County's delegates to the Virginia House of Delegates. Charles City County voters re-elected him annually until 1788. Furthermore, fellow delegates elected Tyler as their Speaker in 1781, when he succeeded Benjamin Harrison (who legislators had elected the Governor), and re-elected Tyler until 1785, when Benjamin Harrison again became the Speaker).

In addition to his legislative service, Tyler served as a Judge of the Virginia High Court of Admiralty from 1776 to 1788. He was a member of the Virginia Council of State (now the Virginia Governor's Council) from 1780 to 1781. Legislators elected Tyler a Judge of the General Court of Virginia starting in 1788.

=== Virginia ratification convention ===
Charles City County voters elected Tyler as one of their representatives to the Virginia Ratifying Convention that ultimately ratified the United States Constitution in 1788. During that convocation, fellow delegates elected Tyler the convention's vice-president. In the debates over ratification of the United States Constitution, like George Mason and Patrick Henry, Tyler was an Anti-Federalist, ultimately voting against the document, although a narrow margin ratified it. Tyler explained his opposition stating, "It has been often observed ... that liberty ought not to be given up without knowing the terms. The gentlemen themselves cannot agree in the construction of various clauses of [the Constitution]; and so long as this is the case, so long shall liberty be in danger."

=== Governor ===
Legislators elected Tyler the 15th Governor of Virginia from 1808 to 1811.

== Federal judicial service ==
President James Madison on January 2, 1811, appointed Tyler to a seat on the United States District Court for the District of Virginia vacated by Judge Cyrus Griffin. The United States Senate confirmed the appointment on January 3, 1811. Tyler received his commission on January 7, 1811. Thus, Tyler judged some cases on his circuit with U.S. Supreme Court Chief Justice John Marshall, who had resided in Richmond and who had been a Federalist both during that Ratifying Convention years earlier, and in later elections.

== Death and legacy ==
Tyler died on January 6, 1813, at Greenway Plantation in Charles City County. His official papers as Governor are held by the Library of Virginia.

Tyler County, West Virginia, is named in Tyler's honor.

== Family ==
Tyler married Mary Marot Armistead in 1776. His wife was the only child of Robert Booth and Ann (Shields) Armistead of Kings Creek Plantation in York County, Virginia (her ancestor, another Robert Booth, had served as a burgess representing the county in 1653 and 1654–1655.) They had eight children, including future President John Tyler.

Political offices
Preceded by William H. Cabell	15th Governor of Virginia; 1808–1811	Succeeded by James Monroe
Legal offices
Preceded by Cyrus Griffin	Judge of the United States District Court for the District of Virginia; 1811–1813	Succeeded by St. George Tucker
