= Weyanoke, Virginia =

Historic house in Virginia, United States

- Weyanoke
- U.S. National Register of Historic Places
- Virginia Landmarks Register
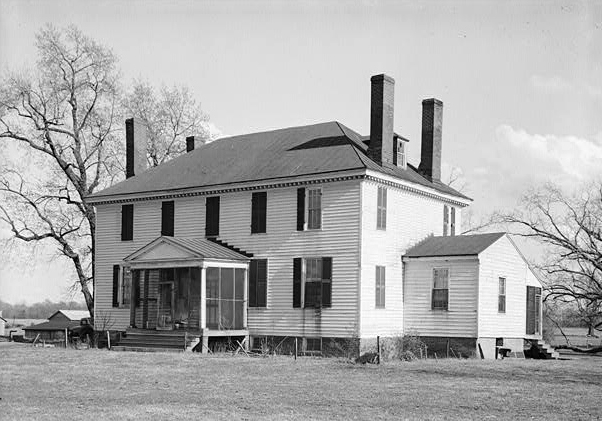
- Weyanoke plantation house, HABS photo, 1930s

- Location within Virginia Location within the United States
- Location: Route 619 off Route 5, Charles City, Virginia
- Coordinates: 37°17′30″N 77°3′56″W
- Area: 1,225 acres (496 ha)
- Built: c. 1790
- Architectural style: Georgian
- NRHP reference No.: 80004406
- VLR No.: 018-0029

Significant dates
- Added to NRHP: March 10, 1980
- Designated VLR: September 21, 1976

Weyanoke is a plantation farmstead in Charles City County, Virginia, United States. In 1619, the First Africans in Virginia arrived at the Weyanoke Peninsula. They created the first African community in North America. The Westover Plantation and related archaeological sites were listed on the National Register of Historic Places in 1980.

On October 30, 1665, Joseph Harwood was granted 422 acres of land on the north side of the James River. This land was known as Weynoke. This tract passed from the Harwood family to the Lewis family when Agnes Harwood married Fielding Lewis. Developed for tobacco culture by slaves, the Weyanoke Plantation includes a formal Georgian style mansion built in the 1790s. The mansion is a two-story frame house sheathed with molded weatherboards and set on a brick foundation. It was built by Fielding Lewis who was named for his uncle Col. Fielding Lewis of Fredericksburg. Some 40 archaeological sites, associated with Native American, African American, and European American activities, have been identified in the 20th and 21st centuries as part of the historic property.

Weyanoke Plantation was passed through marriage to the Douthat family, whose descendants kept ownership through the American Civil War. In June 1864 the Union Army under General Grant crossed from Weyanoke Point to Flowerdew Hundred on the south bank of the James River on a hastily constructed pontoon bridge.

The original house was enlarged after 1938. Within the property's boundaries are the archaeological remains of man's continuous occupation of the site, which spans 10,000 years.

In 1972 Weyanoke was acquired by Lawrence Lewis, Jr., a descendant of Fielding Lewis. Lewis, a businessman, philanthropist, benefactor of generations of conservative politicians, and founder of Flagler College in St. Augustine, Florida, was an heir to a fortune amassed in oil and railroad investments by Henry Morrison Flagler, who in 1870 founded Standard Oil Co. with John D. Rockefeller. Lewis' fortune was estimated at $120 million in the July 1993 issue of Virginia Business magazine.
