= Mount Stirling (Providence Forge, Virginia) =

Historic house in Virginia, United States

- U.S. National Register of Historic Places
- Virginia Landmarks Register
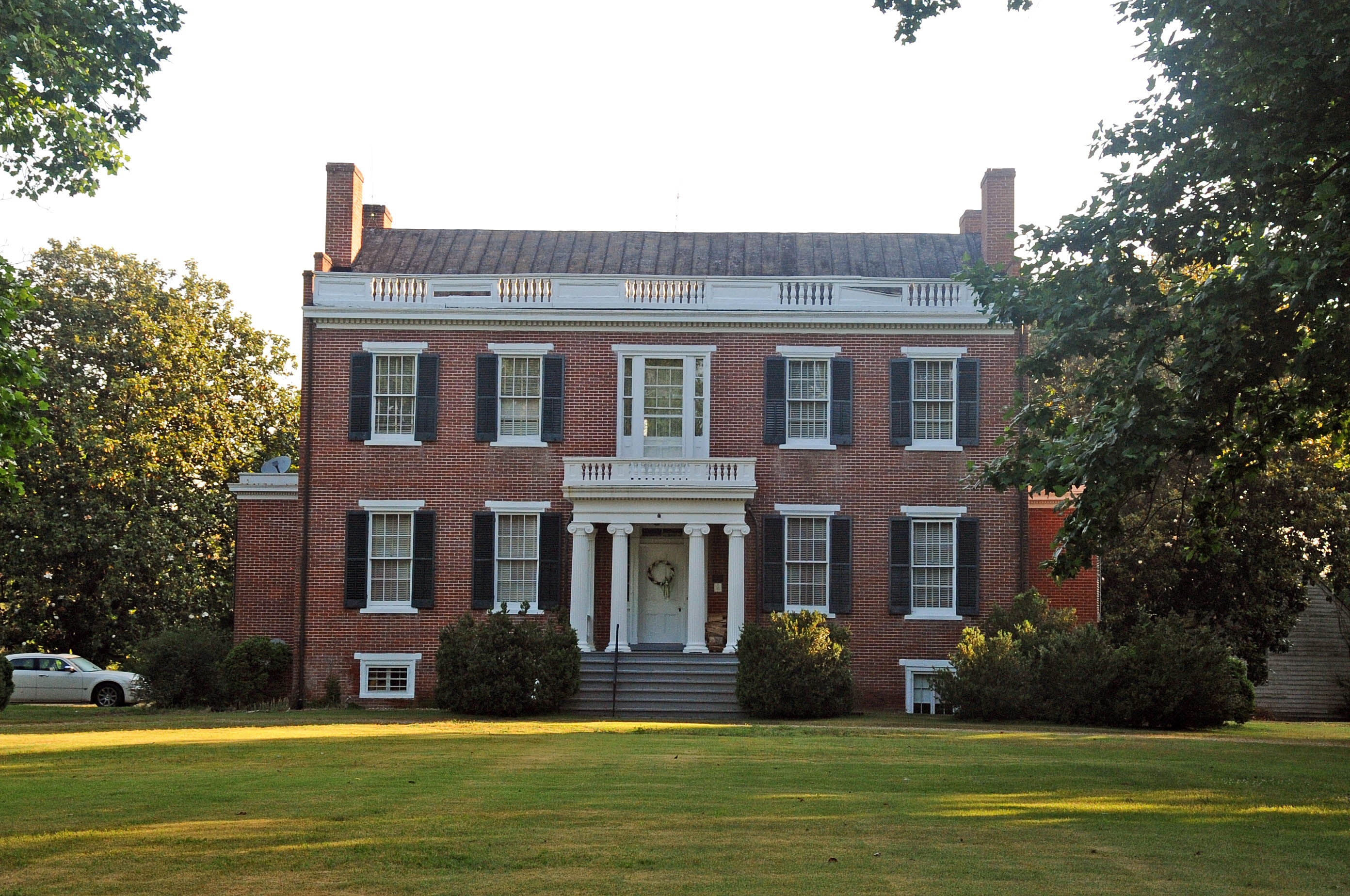

- Location within Virginia Location within the United States
- Location: VA 155 E side, 3200 ft. NNE of jct. with VA 614, Providence Forge, Virginia
- Coordinates: 37°25′32″N 77°02′14″W
- Area: 56 acres (23 ha)
- Built: 1851
- Architectural style: Greek Revival
- NRHP reference No.: 93000005
- VLR No.: 018-0015

Significant dates
- Added to NRHP: February 4, 1993
- Designated VLR: December 9, 1992

Mount Stirling is a historic plantation house located at Providence Forge, Charles City County, Virginia. It was built in 1851, and is a 2 1/2-story, red brick, Greek Revival style plantation house. It features a small-scale Greek Ionic order portico and stepped gable parapets. Also on the property is a contributing altered kitchen building. The house sits among formally landscaped grounds undertaken in the 1940s. The plantation was the scene of significant activity during the American Civil War, as Union soldiers occupied the house in 1862 and again in 1864.

It was added to the National Register of Historic Places in 1993.
