= Charles City County Courthouse =

- U.S. National Register of Historic Places
- Virginia Landmarks Register
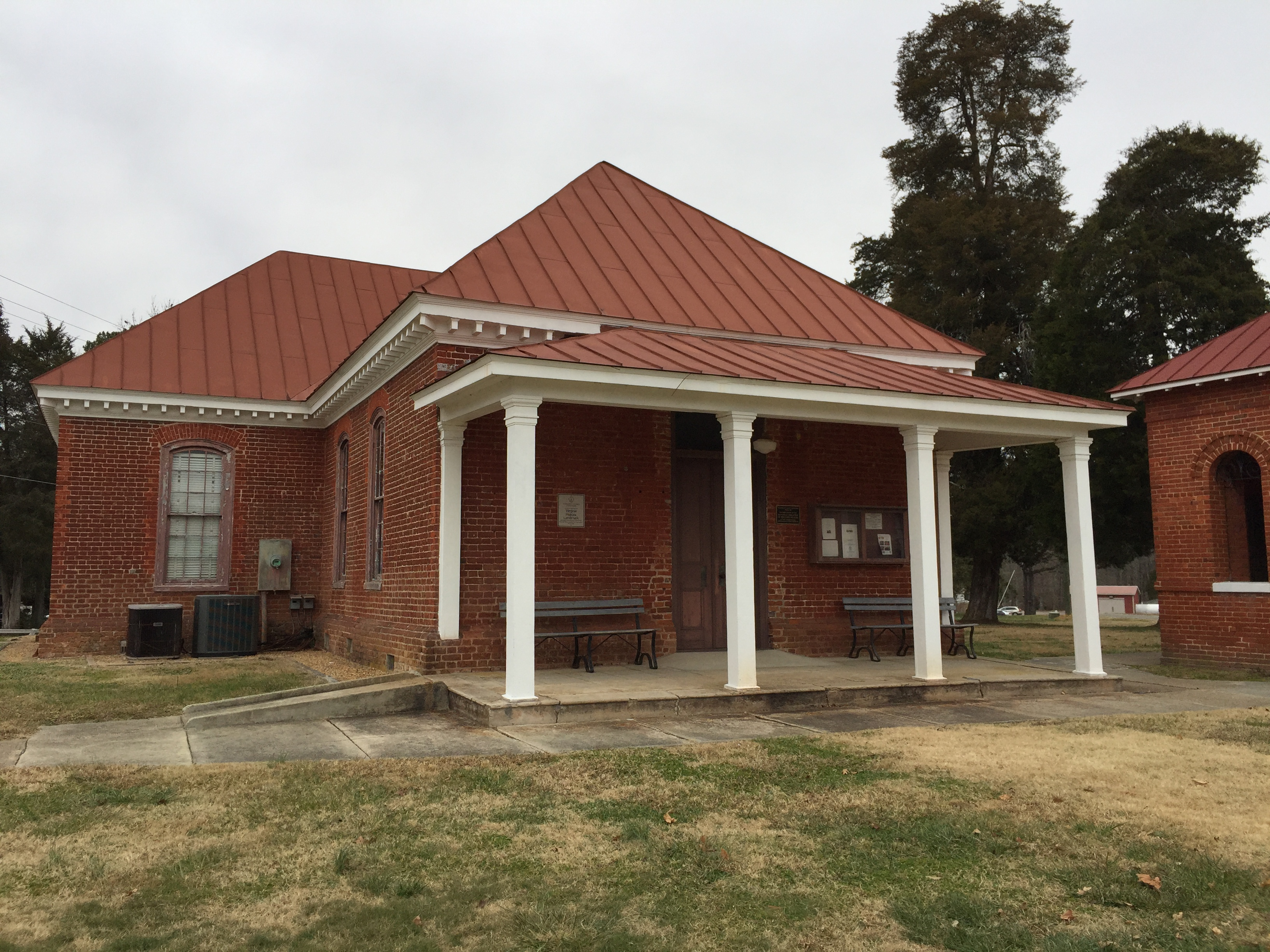
- Charles City historic courthouse, 2018

- Location within Virginia Location within the United States
- Interactive map showing the location of Charles City County Courthouse
- Location: VA 5, Charles City, Virginia
- Coordinates: 37°20′29″N 77°4′21″W
- Area: Less than one acre
- Built: 1730
- NRHP reference No.: 69000335
- VLR No.: 018-0005

Significant dates
- Added to NRHP: November 12, 1969
- Designated VLR: September 9, 1969

The Charles City County Courthouse is a historic county courthouse located at Charles City, Charles City County, Virginia. It was built about 1730, and is a one-story, T-shaped, brick structure. It has an apparently original modillion cornice and a steep hipped roof covered in tin. It features an arcaded front. Also on the property are a contributing Confederate monument, a late 19th-century clerk's office with later additions, and a frame jail building built about 1867.

It was listed on the National Register of Historic Places in 1982.

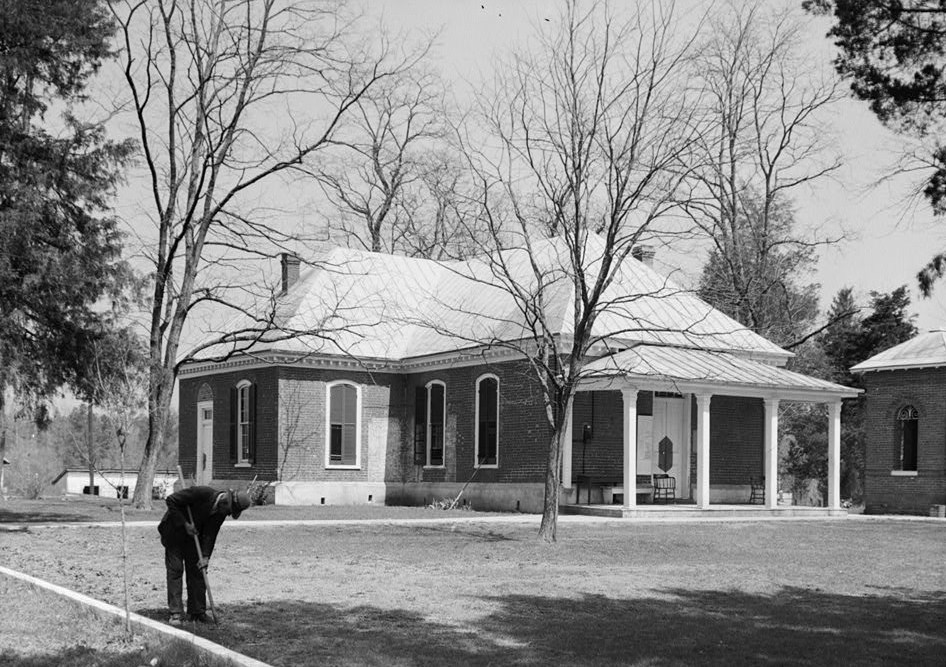
Courthouse, HABS Photo
