= Piney Grove at Southall's Plantation =

Historic house in Virginia, United States

- Piney Grove
- U.S. National Register of Historic Places
- Virginia Landmarks Register
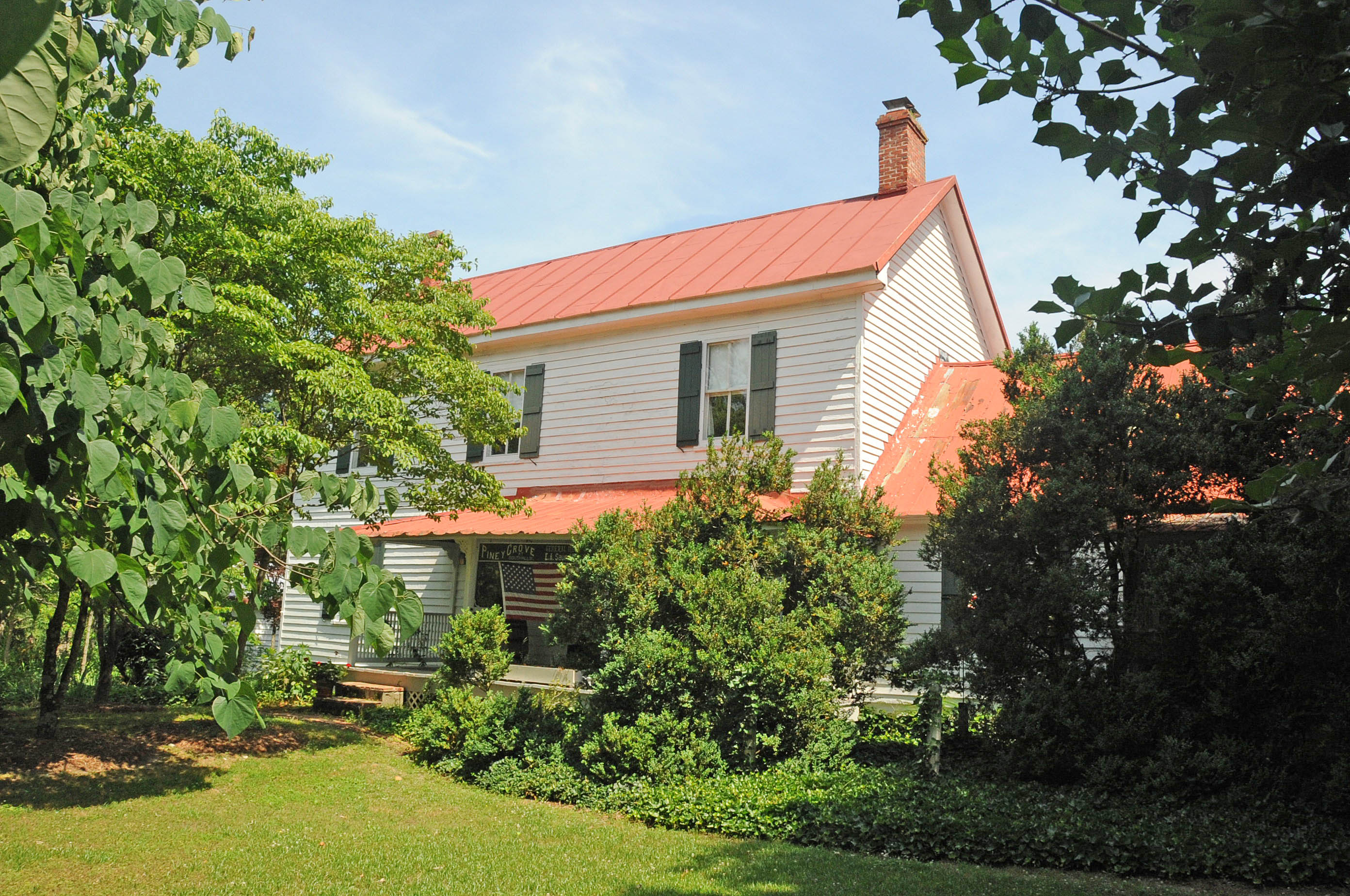

- Location within Virginia Location within the United States
- Location: VA 615, Holdcroft, Virginia
- Coordinates: 37°22′24″N 76°58′42″W
- Area: 5.2 acres (2.1 ha)
- Built: c. 1800, c. 1820, 1853, c. 1905
- Architectural style: Log building
- NRHP reference No.: 85003052
- VLR No.: 018-0063

Significant dates
- Added to NRHP: November 26, 1985
- Designated VLR: June 18, 1985

Piney Grove at Southall's Plantation is a property listed on the National Register of Historic Places in Holdcroft, Charles City County, Virginia. The scale and character of the collection of domestic architecture at this site recall the vernacular architectural traditions of the eighteenth, nineteenth and twentieth centuries along the James River.

Located mostly north of today's Virginia State Route 5, these frame structures of the common planters were in contrast to the elaborate brick residences of the wealthiest families who developed plantations along the waterfront of the James River. Piney Grove at Southall's Plantation is located on the high ridge of land to the north of the river, in an area of smaller plantations with more modest homes.

The original section was built about 1800 as a 20-by-22-foot (6.1 m × 6.7 m), one-story log corn crib. It was expanded to a 1 1/2-story log store about 1820. In 1853, two additions were built, and in the early 20th century, a two-story block was created which incorporated the two rooms of the 1853 addition. The house is a rare survival of log vernacular architecture in Tidewater Virginia and a unique survival of a log agricultural building that was later twice incorporated into a much larger frame structure.

It was added to the Virginia Landmarks Register and the National Register of Historic Places in 1985.

== History ==
Before English settlement in the seventeenth century, the Southall plantation site in Charles City County was part of the homeland of the Chickahominy (tribe). The plantation site is located near the Mattahunk village site and the trail known as Necotowance's Path.

During the late eighteenth century, the 300-acre (120 ha) plantation was one of the many seats of the Southall family in the region. Other Southall family properties in Charles City County included Mt. Airy, Milton and Vaughn's. In Henrico County, the Southall homes of Chatsworth, Reveille, and Westham were located, and another branch had Young's Island in Warwick County.

The original portion of the Piney Grove house was constructed before 1790 as a log corn crib on the Southall plantation. It survives as a rare and well-preserved example of early log architecture in Tidewater Virginia. During the second quarter of the eighteenth century, Furneau Southall served as deputy-sheriff of Charles City County, under Otway Byrd, son of William Byrd III of Westover Plantation. During the American Revolution, Southall served on the Charles City County Committee of Safety with John Tyler of Greenway, father of President John Tyler of Woodburn and Sherwood Forest Plantations. Southall also held a captainship of one of the Charles City County companies under Benjamin Harrison V of Berkeley Plantation.

In 1790 Southall administered the first U.S. Census locally. During the late eighteenth century, residents of the plantation included Furneau Southall, his wife, and seven children. Also housed here were sixteen slaves: Amy, Bess, Bristol, Critty, Dick, Dublin, Jack, Kate, Lucky, Nutty, Patsey, Pompy, Peter, Rippons, Rose, and Silvia. The personal property tax lists also document the plantation furnishings, library, and livestock.

The plantation was held by the Southall family until 1857, when Furneau's grandson, John Seth Stubblefield, sold a portion of the plantation to Edmund Archer Saunders. This portion of the property included the log corn crib, which by 1857 had been converted and enlarged for use as a store. The 1851 addition to the original log structure may have been constructed with timbers re-used from the original plantation house: Original post and beam framing was reused in balloon frame construction. Under Saunders's ownership, the rural general merchandise business became known as Piney Grove Store.

=== Post-Civil War to present ===
Following the American Civil War, Saunders moved to Richmond, where he became a successful wholesale grocer. He became a major landowner in Charles City County, purchasing properties such as Indian Fields, Weyanoke, and Upper Shirley. He commissioned a handsome stone baptismal font for Westover Episcopal Church, which remains in use there. A portrait of Saunders hangs in the drawing room of the big house at Evelynton Plantation, which was built by his granddaughter Mary Ball Saunders Ruffin and her husband.

Thomas Fletcher Harwood operated Piney Grove Store from 1874 until 1915. In 1905 he enlarged and adapted the store building as a five-bedroom residence. During Harwood's ownership, the property also included the office of his physician son, Dr. Ashton Harwood. The Harwood family children's cemetery is located on the grounds. It has elaborate cast-iron fencing produced by the Cincinnati Ironworks. From 1916 until 1984, Piney Grove belonged to the Hughes family.

== Heritage tourism ==
After purchase in 1984, the Gordineer family began a five-year restoration of the house. Original outbuildings on the property include a smokehouse, chicken house, and small and large pole sheds to store farm equipment. Hughes family photographs document there were formerly both large and small barns, and a dairy that are no longer standing. The archaeological remains of Dr. Harwood's office survive just northwest of the large pole shed.

Piney Grove has been furnished with a collection of antiques and artifacts that chronicle the history of the property. They include family antiques that descend in the Gordineer family through a Canadian branch of the family, descendants of Judge Edward Bowen of Quebec, Canada. Bowen portraits include Edward Bowen, Isabella Cassan Bowen, and Isabella Bowen Hyndman.

The grounds include a collection of folk architecture moved to Piney Grove at Southall's Plantation to be spared from demolition at their original sites. These buildings are Ashland (built 1835 in James City County, Virginia); Dower Quarter (built 1835, Henrico County, Virginia); Ladysmith (built 1857, Caroline County, Virginia); Duck Church (built 1917, Dare County, North Carolina); Pocahontas Tea House Outhouse (built ca. 1930, Henrico County), and Peace Hill Smokehouse (built ca. 1920, Charles City County). The grounds also include a reproduction of the Lanexa Farmstand (built ca. 1940, James City County, Virginia).

The complex is listed on the National Register of Historic Places. The grounds are open daily from 9:00 a.m. to 5:00 p.m. daily, and guided tours of the house are available daily by appointment. Bed and breakfast lodging is available in the historic Ladysmith house on the property. The property is an official site of the Virginia Civil War Trails, Virginia Birding and Wildlife Trail, Virginia Time Travelers Program, Jamestown Discovery Trail, and National Register "James River Plantations" Travel Itinerary.

== See also ==
- List of James River plantations
