= List of places in Charles City County, Virginia =

CDPs and unincorporated communities

This is a list of places in Charles City County, Virginia. Charles City County is located in the Richmond region.

Map

== Census-designated places ==
=== Charles City ===
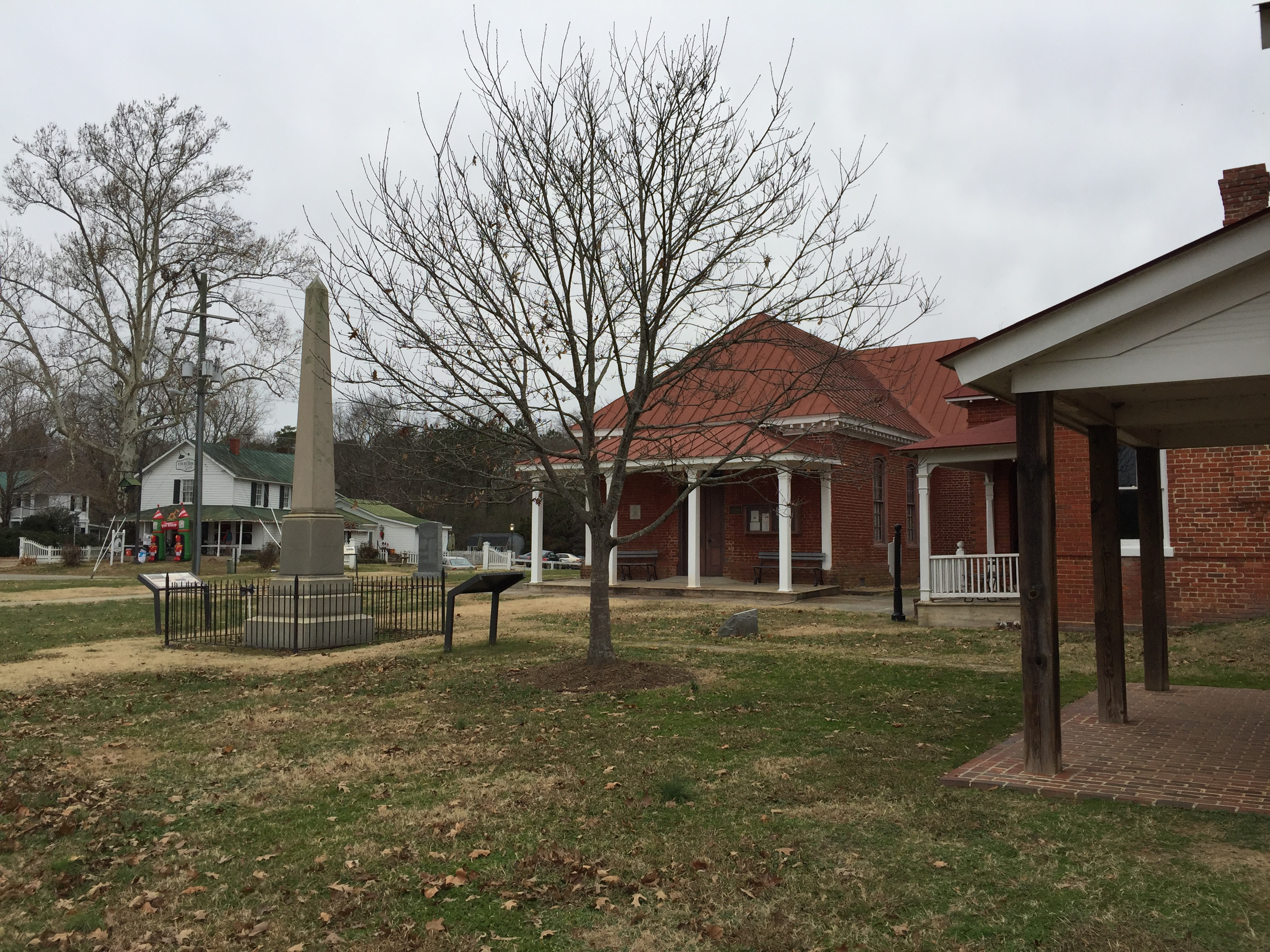
Charles City, 2017, showing the Confederate monument and the historic courthouse

Charles City is a census-designated place (CDP) in Charles City County, Virginia, United States. It is the county seat of Charles City County. The population as of the 2020 census was 104.

== Unincorporated communities ==
=== Barnetts ===
Barnetts is an unincorporated community in Charles City County, Virginia, United States.

The community is located at 37°22′02″N 77°09′28″W.

=== Binns Hall ===
Binns Hall is an unincorporated community in eastern Charles City County, Virginia, United States. Binns Hall lies at the intersection of the Glebe Lane and Liberty Church Roads. A post office once occupied the Binns Hall Store. The community had two schools and a hall of the Order of St. Lukes. Liberty Baptist Church continues to operate in the community.

The community is located at 37°22′10.2″N 76°59′21.1″W.

The historic homes of Binns Hall listed on the National Register of Historic Places include Poplar Springs, a home of the Joseph Vaiden family;, and Piney Grove at Southall's Plantation, the plantation of Furneau Southall. Other historic homes include Meadow Springs, another Vaiden homestead; and Moss Side, built by Edmund Archer Saunders. The Harwood family cemetery is located on the grounds of Piney Grove at Southall's Plantation.

=== Blanks Store ===
Blanks Store is an unincorporated community in Charles City County, Virginia, United States.

The community is located at 37°18′31″N 76°56′15″W.

=== Ednas Mill ===
Ednas Mill is an unincorporated community in Charles City County, Virginia, United States.

The community is located at37°27′26″N 77°07′48″W.

=== Granville ===
Granville is an unincorporated community in Charles City County, Virginia, United States.

The community is located at37°22′56″N 77°14′29″W.

=== Greenway ===
Greenway is an unincorporated community in Charles City County, Virginia, United States.

The community is located at 37°20′28″N 77°04′54″W.

=== Harrisons Landing ===
Harrisons Landing is an unincorporated community in Charles City County, Virginia, United States.

The community is located at 37°18′49″N 77°10′47″W.

=== Holdcroft ===
Holdcroft is an unincorporated community in Charles City County, Virginia, United States. Capital Airlines Flight 20 crashed in Holdcroft on January 18, 1960.

The community is located at 37°21′56″N 76°56′06″W.

Piney Grove was added to the National Register of Historic Places in 1985.

=== Kennon ===
Kennon is an unincorporated community in Charles City County, Virginia, United States.

The community is located at 37°18′39″N 76°59′38″W.

=== Kimages ===
Kimages is an unincorporated community in Charles City County, Virginia, United States.

The community is located at 37°21′10″N 77°11′40″W.

=== Milton ===
Milton is an unincorporated community in Charles City County, Virginia, United States.

The community is located at 37°18′27″N 77°01′28″W

=== Montpelier ===
Montpelier is an unincorporated community in Charles City County, Virginia, United States.

The community is located at 37°22′36″N 77°09′34″W.

=== Mount Airy ===
Mount Airy is an unincorporated community in Charles City County, Virginia, United States.

The community is located at 37°21′05″N 76°55′05″W.

=== Nance ===
Nance is an unincorporated community in Charles City County, Virginia, United States.

The community is located at 37°27′41″N 77°07′39″W.

=== New Hope ===
New Hope is an unincorporated community in Charles City County, Virginia, United States.

The community is located at 37°20′29″N 77°03′41″W.

=== Rolands Mill ===
Rolands Mill is an unincorporated community in Charles City County, Virginia, United States.

The community is located at 37°19′48″N 77°10′53″W.

=== The Row ===
The Row is an unincorporated community in Charles City County, Virginia, United States.

The community is located at 37°15′34″N 76°58′01″W.

=== Roxbury ===
Roxbury is an unincorporated community in Charles City County, Virginia, United States.

The community is located at 37°27′54″N 77°08′27″W.

=== Rustic ===
Rustic is an unincorporated community in Charles City County, Virginia, United States.

The community is located at 37°17′30″N 76°56′01″W.

=== Ruthville ===
Ruthville is an unincorporated community in Charles City County, Virginia, United States.

The community is located at 37°22′03″N 77°02′28″W.

The community was the central point of the county's free African American population for many years, even before the Civil War (1861–1865). Following Emancipation, the crossroads community included the Mercantile Cooperative Company and Ruthville Training School. The United Sorghum Growers Club also met here.

Earlier known by several other names, the name "Ruthville" recalls local resident Ruth Brown. Her name was selected when the Post Office was established there in 1880.

In 1901, the first Black co-op based on the Rochdale Principles was established in Ruthville. "Community cooperation" was and is very important in this "sparsely populated and overwhelmingly rural" area.

=== Sandybottom ===
Sandybottom is an unincorporated community in Charles City County, Virginia, United States.

The community is located at 37°24′48″N 77°02′40″W.

=== Tettington ===
Tettington is an unincorporated community in Charles City County, Virginia, United States.

The community is located at 37.2456°N 76.9438°W.

=== Wayside ===
Wayside is an unincorporated community in Charles City County, Virginia, United States.

The community is located at 37°22′21″N 77°11′41″W.
