= Charles City County, Virginia =

County in Virginia, United States

County of Charles City
- County
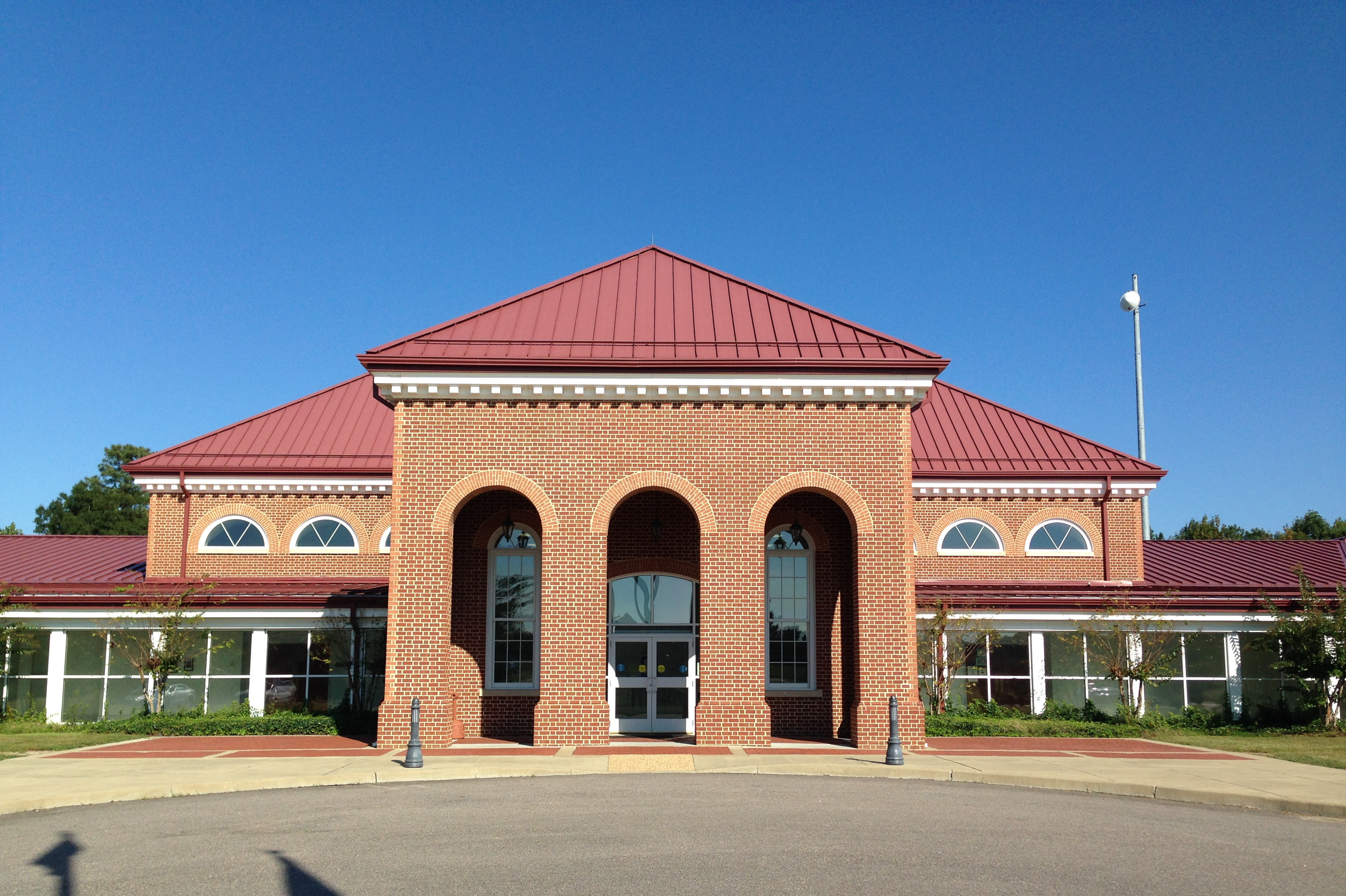
- Iona Whitehead-Adkins Courthouse

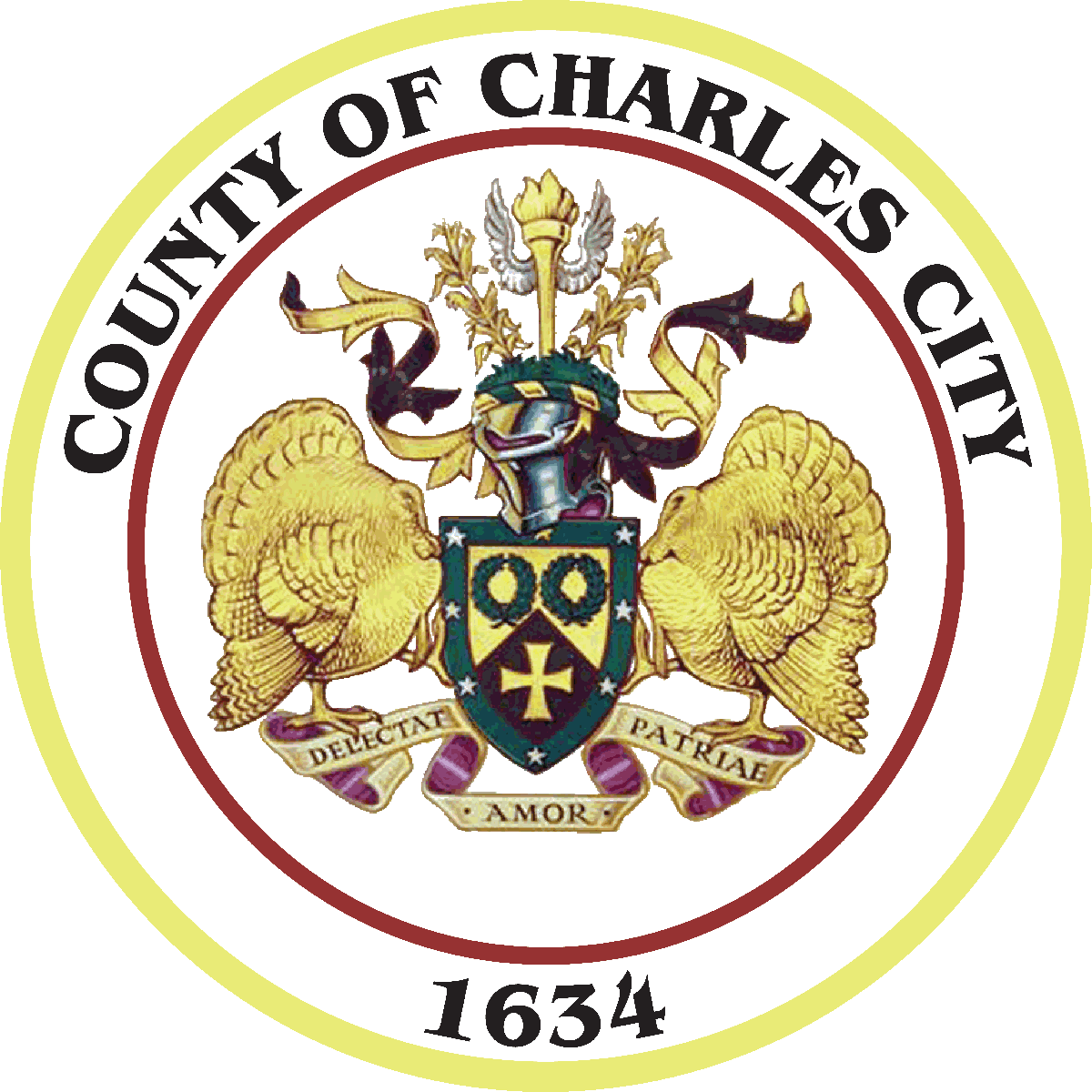
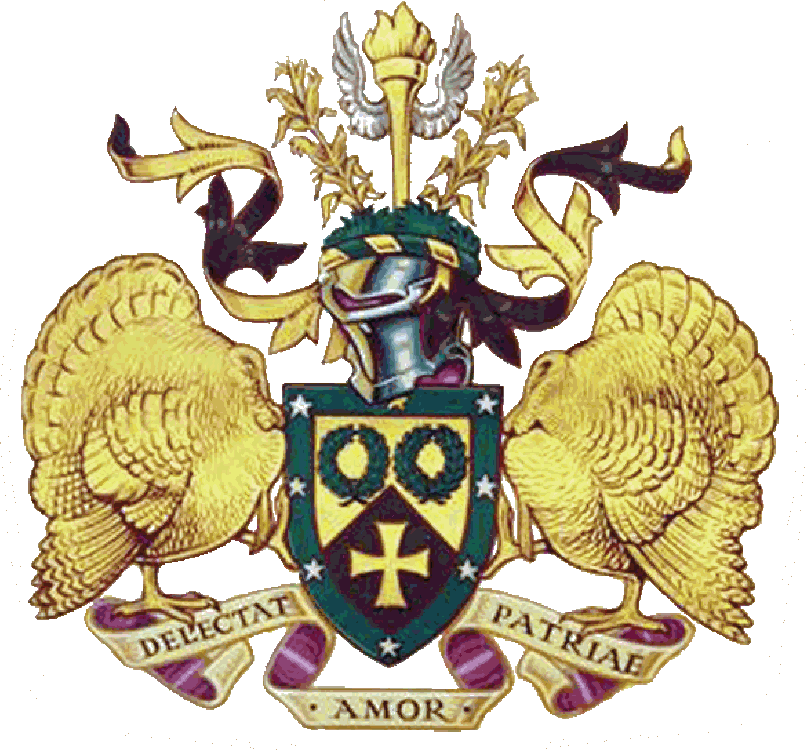
- Seal Logo

- Location within the U.S. state of Virginia
- Coordinates: 37°21′N 77°04′W
- Country: United States
- State: Virginia
- Founded: 1619
- Named for: Charles I of England
- Seat: Charles City

Area
  - Total: 204 sq mi (530 km^{2})
  - Land: 183 sq mi (470 km^{2})
  - Water: 21 sq mi (54 km^{2}) 10.5%

Population (2020)
  - Total: 6,773
  - Estimate (2025): 6,623 ▼
  - Density: 37/sq mi (14/km^{2})
- Time zone: UTC−5 (Eastern)
  - Summer (DST): UTC−4 (EDT)
- Congressional district: 4th
- Website: charlescityva.us

Charles City County, Virginia from 1895 state map

Charles City County is a county located in the U.S. commonwealth of Virginia. The county is situated southeast of Richmond and west of Jamestown. It is bounded on the south by the James River and on the east by the Chickahominy River.

The area that would become Charles City County was first established as "Charles Cittie" by the Virginia Company in 1619. It was one of the first four "boroughs" of Virginia, and was named in honor of Prince Charles, who would later become King Charles I of England. After Virginia became a royal colony, the borough was changed to "Charles City Shire" in 1634, as one of the five original Shires of Virginia. It acquired the present name of Charles City County in 1643.

In the 21st century, Charles City County is part of the Greater Richmond Region of the state of Virginia. As of the 2020 census, the county population was 6,773; it is still relatively rural and one of the smaller counties in Virginia by population. Its county seat is the community of Charles City.

Notable natives include the 9th and 10th presidents of the United States, William Henry Harrison and John Tyler.

== History ==
=== Native Americans ===
Various Indian tribes had used this area for thousands of years. When the region was explored by the English in the 17th century, the Algonquian-speaking Chickahominy tribe inhabited areas along the Chickahominy River that was later named for them by English colonists. The Paspahegh lived in Sandy Point, and the Weanoc lived in the Weyanoke Neck area. The latter two tribes were part of the Powhatan Confederacy. At the time of the earliest English settlement, the independent Chickahominy people occupied territory surrounded by numerous tribes of the powerful Powhatan Confederacy, but they were not part of it. Chickahominy descendants still inhabit the region. These three tribes were all Algonquian-speaking tribes, the language family of the varied peoples who occupied the Tidewater and low country in Virginia and along the East Coast from Canada to south of the Carolinas.

The English named the Weyanoke Peninsula after the Weyanoc tribe, whom they encountered in the area. The Weyanoc were gradually displaced by colonial encroachment. They merged with other, larger tribes about the time of Bacon's Rebellion (1676-1677).

=== English colonization ===
The English began to colonize the area under the auspices of the Virginia Company, a private company formed to support this effort and gain profits from expected development and trade.

In 1619, the Virginia Company established Charles Cittie [sic] as one of the first four "boroughs" or "incorporations" in the region. West of James County, it was named for Prince Charles, second son of King James I of England, who became the Prince of Wales and heir apparent after the death of his older brother Henry in 1612. After his father's death, he became King Charles I of England.

1619 marked the arrival of the first enslaved Africans in the Tidewater area. They had been captured from a Spanish ship and first landed at Point Comfort (present-day Hampton, Virginia). They were treated as indentured servants in the colony, and at least one later became a landowner after gaining his freedom. Weyanoke, remains a rural locality in Charles City County, Virginia.

The Virginia Company lost its charter in 1624 under King James I, and Virginia became a royal colony. Charles City Shire was formed in 1634 in the Virginia Colony by order of the King. Its name was changed to Charles City County in 1643. It is one of the five original shires in Virginia that are extant in essentially the same political entity (county) as they were originally formed in 1634. Colonists developed the land as tobacco plantations and produced this commodity crop for export.

Cultivation and processing of this crop required intensive labor. The wealthier planters recruited indentured servants from the British Isles and Africa, and later purchased numerous enslaved Africans. In Virginia and the Upper South, historians have classified persons holding 20 or more slaves as planters.

The majority of the colonists were English people who arrived as indentured servants and who owed labor, often as much as seven years, to wealthy patrons who had paid for their passage to gain land and laborers. The English government offered land grants to these patrons under a headright system, which was a way to encourage settlement in the colony. During the 17th century, for economic times encouraged many to settle in the North American colonies. In the early years, the Chesapeake Bay Colony had many more men than women, but more women entered began emigrating and families were begun.

As the indentured servants worked off their passage, they would be granted land of their own. By then the most successful planter families already controlled the valuable riverfront property. This gave them ready access to the waterways, the transportation system for trade and travel. Hence, later planters generally settled in the upland section of the county.

The original central city of the county was Charles City Point, located south of the James River at the confluence of the Appomattox River. The first Charles City County courthouses were located along the James River at Westover on the north side and at City Point on the south side. The latter's name was shortened from Charles City Point.

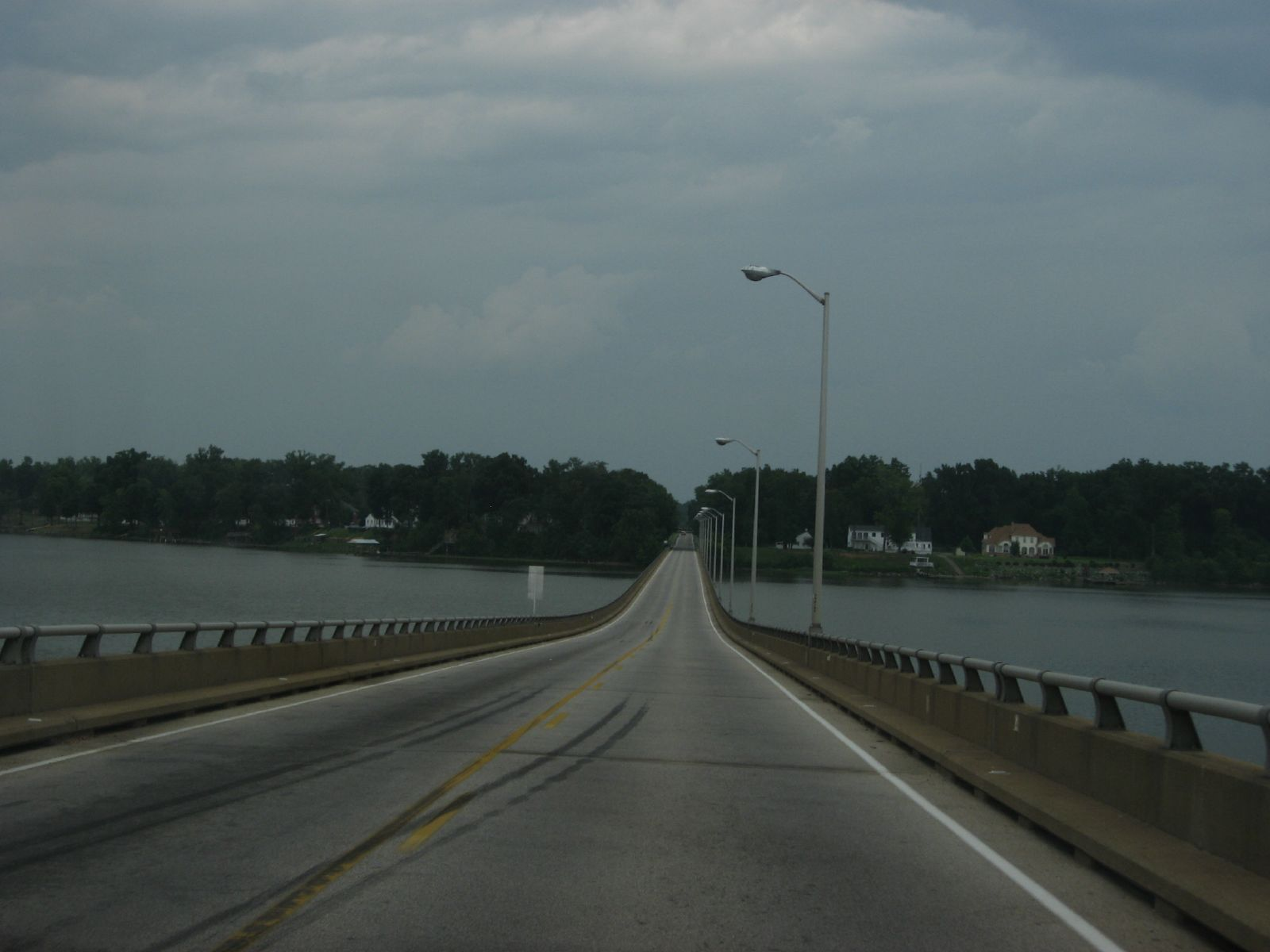
Crossing the James River on Benjamin Harrison Bridge from the South to enter Charles City County

=== Breaking off other counties and cities ===
In 1703, all of the original area of Charles City County south of the James River was severed to form Prince George County. This in turn was later divided, in a pattern typical of colonial development, into several other counties and independent cities. From Charles City County through Prince George County came Brunswick County in 1732; Amelia County in 1735; and Prince Edward County in 1754. The incorporated town of City Point, then in Prince George County, was annexed by the independent city of Hopewell in 1923.

After 1703, Charles City County was limited to land on the north bank of the James River, between James City County to its east and Henrico County to its west (both also previously colonial shires). Charles City County is bordered by New Kent County to its north and Henrico County to its north-west. During the late 19th century, numerous crossroads communities developed among the plantations to serve the religious, educational and mercantile needs of the citizenry of rural Charles City County. Crossroad communities, such as Adkins Store, Cedar Grove, Binns Hall, Parrish Hill, Ruthville and Wayside, typically included a store, church and school. (Public schools were not established until after the Civil War, when the Reconstruction legislature founded the system.)

All told, five counties: Prince George County, Brunswick, Dinwiddie, Amelia, and Prince Edward; and three independent cities: Hopewell, Petersburg and Colonial Heights have been formed from the original territory of Charles City Shire.

=== Early Religion ===
As in other parts of the Tidewater, common planters and merchants of Charles City County were attracted by the appeal of Methodist and Baptist preachers in the Great Awakening in the late 18th and early 19th centuries. Several Methodist and Baptist churches were established in the early 19th century, mostly in the upland areas of the county. The county also had numerous Quaker settlers. The elite planters of the James River plantations tended to remain Anglican; the United States Episcopal Church was founded after the American Revolution.

=== Black Americans ===
With the growth of tobacco as a cash crop, demand for workers increased. Twenty-three African slaves were known to have been brought to Charles City County before 1660. During the late 1600s and early 1700s, African slave labor rapidly supplanted European indentured servants. By the eighteenth century, slaves had become the major source of agricultural labor in the Virginia Colony, then devoted primarily to the labor-intensive commodity crop of tobacco.

The earliest record of a free black living in Charles City County is the September 16, 1677, petition for freedom by a woman named Susannah. The Lott Cary House in the county has long been honored as the birth site of Lott Cary, a slave who purchased his freedom and that of his children. In the 19th century, he became a founding father of the new country of Liberia in Africa.

Beginning as early as the 17th century, some planters freed individual slaves by manumission. Some free mixed-race families, established before the American Revolution, were formed by descendants of unions or marriages between white indentured or free women and African men, indentured, slave or free. Colonial law and the principle of partus sequitur ventrem, provided that children were born into the status of their mother. Thus, the mixed-race children of white women were born free. If illegitimate, they had to serve time in lengthy apprenticeships, but freedom gave them an important step forward.

In the first two decades after the American Revolution, numerous planters in Charles City County freed their slaves, persuaded by Quaker, Baptist and Methodist abolitionists. Many free blacks settled together in today's Ruthville, Virginia, a crossroads and one of the first free-black communities in present-day Charles City County and the state of Virginia. The unincorporated town of Ruthville was the center of the county's free black population for many years. Following emancipation, Ruthville became the site of the Mercantile Cooperative Company and the Ruthville Training School. The United Sorghum Growers Club also met here. Known previously by several other names, the name "Ruthville" recalls local resident Ruth Brown. Her name was selected for the local Post Office established there in 1880.

When the Union Army began recruiting black troops during the American Civil War, many black Americans from Charles City County enlisted. In 1864, United States Colored Troops stationed at Fort Pocahontas roundly repelled an attack by 2500 Confederate troops commanded by Major General Fitzhugh Lee, nephew of General Robert E. Lee.

Virginia established statewide legal racial segregation when white Democrats regained control of the state legislature. They disfranchised most blacks at the turn of the century, maintaining this exclusion until after passage of civil rights legislation. In 1968, following passage of the federal Civil Rights Act and Voting Rights Act of the 1960s, and federal enforcement of the black franchise, James Bradby of Charles City County was the first black American Virginian to be elected to the position of County Sheriff.

=== James River plantations ===
Charles City County is the location of several historic plantations.

- Berkeley Plantation is the birthplace of William Henry Harrison, ninth president of the United States, born on February 9, 1773.
- Greenway Plantation is the birthplace of John Tyler, the tenth president, was born in 1790.
- Sherwood Forest Plantation was bought by John Tyler in 1842. Tyler descendants have resided at Sherwood Forest Plantation continuously since then.
- Shirley Plantation was the home of the Edward Hill family, including two Speakers of the House of Burgesses in the 17th century. The fourth generation Edward Hill died as a teenager, after one of his sisters married John Carter of Coromatan Plantation in Lancaster County, the son of King Carter. Their son Charles Hill Carter inherited Shirley Plantation before the American Revolutionary War, although he also inherited Coromatan and transferred his main residence there. Nonetheless, Shirley Plantation has remained in the family, operated by three men named Hill Carter in the 19th century, and later by descendants of General Robert E. Lee (his mother, Ann Hill Carter, was Charles Hill Carter's daughter) who still live and work the plantation today.
- Westover Plantation was first occupied in 1619 and was the home of Captain Thomas Palett in 1637. Westover was the home of Richard Bland, William Byrd I, and William Byrd II (founder of Richmond). It was William Byrd the III that built the current mansion around 1750. The plantation is the resting place of William Byrd I, and William Byrd II. The plantation has had eight owners since the Byrd family possessed the property. During the Civil War, Major General Fitz John Porter was stationed at Westover. General Porter was the protégé to Major General George McClellan who occupied nearby Berkeley Plantation.

== Geography ==
Ruthville, VA

Climate chart (precipitation, max. and min. temperature)
J	F	M	A	M	J	J	A	S	O	N	D
3.2 48 27	2.9 52 29	4 61 36	3.3 71 45	3.9 78 54	3.5 86 64	4.4 89 68	4.3 88 67	4 81 59	3.2 71 47	3.4 62 39	3.4 51 30
- █ Average max. and min. temperatures in °F
- █ Precipitation totals in inches
Metric conversion
J	F	M	A	M	J	J	A	S	O	N	D
81 9 −3	74 11 −2	102 16 2	84 22 7	99 26 12	89 30 18	112 32 20	109 31 19	102 27 15	81 22 9	86 17 4	86 11 −1
- █ Average max. and min. temperatures in °C
- █ Precipitation totals in mm

According to the U.S. Census Bureau, the county has a total area of 204 square miles (530 km^{2}), of which 183 square miles (470 km^{2}) is land and 21 square miles (54 km^{2}) (10.5%) is water.

There are multiple census-designated places and unincorporated communities in Charles City County.

=== Adjacent counties ===
- New Kent County – north
- James City County – east
- Surry County – southeast
- Prince George County – south
- Chesterfield County – southwest
- Henrico County – west

== Demographics ==
Historical population
Census	Pop.	Note	%±
1790	5,588		—
1800	5,365		−4.0%
1810	5,186		−3.3%
1820	5,255		1.3%
1830	5,500		4.7%
1840	4,774		−13.2%
1850	5,200		8.9%
1860	5,609		7.9%
1870	4,975		−11.3%
1880	5,512		10.8%
1890	5,066		−8.1%
1900	5,040		−0.5%
1910	5,253		4.2%
1920	4,793		−8.8%
1930	4,881		1.8%
1940	4,275		−12.4%
1950	4,676		9.4%
1960	5,492		17.5%
1970	6,158		12.1%
1980	6,692		8.7%
1990	6,282		−6.1%
2000	6,926		10.3%
2010	7,256		4.8%
2020	6,773		−6.7%
2025 (est.)	6,623	▼	−2.2%
U.S. Decennial Census; 1790–1960 1900–1990; 1990–2000 2010–2020

=== Racial and ethnic composition ===
Charles City County, Virginia – Racial and ethnic composition Note: the US Census treats Hispanic/Latino as an ethnic category. This table excludes Latinos from the racial categories and assigns them to a separate category. Hispanics/Latinos may be of any race.
Race / Ethnicity (NH = Non-Hispanic)	Pop 1980	Pop 1990	Pop 2000	Pop 2010	Pop 2020	% 1980	% 1990	% 2000	% 2010	% 2020
White alone (NH)	1,390	1,794	2,454	2,939	2,997	20.77%	28.56%	35.43%	40.50%	44.25%
Black or African American alone (NH)	4,647	3,962	3,795	3,511	2,836	69.44%	63.07%	54.79%	48.39%	41.87%
Native American or Alaska Native alone (NH)	552	487	535	495	441	8.25%	7.75%	7.72%	6.82%	6.51%
Asian alone (NH)	3	10	7	24	34	0.04%	0.16%	0.10%	0.33%	0.50%
Native Hawaiian or Pacific Islander alone (NH)	x	x	0	5	6	x	x	0.00%	0.07%	0.09%
Other race alone (NH)	2	5	2	18	50	0.03%	0.08%	0.03%	0.25%	0.74%
Mixed race or Multiracial (NH)	x	x	88	176	308	x	x	1.27%	2.43%	4.55%
Hispanic or Latino (any race)	98	24	45	88	101	1.46%	0.38%	0.65%	1.21%	1.49%
Total	6,692	6,282	6,926	7,256	6,773	100.00%	100.00%	100.00%	100.00%	100.00%

=== 2020 census ===
As of the 2020 census, the county had a population of 6,773. The median age was 52.6 years. 14.7% of residents were under the age of 18 and 26.2% of residents were 65 years of age or older. For every 100 females there were 96.5 males, and for every 100 females age 18 and over there were 96.2 males age 18 and over.

The racial makeup of the county was 44.7% White, 41.9% Black or African American, 6.6% American Indian and Alaska Native, 0.6% Asian, 0.1% Native Hawaiian and Pacific Islander, 1.1% from some other race, and 5.0% from two or more races. Hispanic or Latino residents of any race comprised 1.5% of the population.

0.0% of residents lived in urban areas, while 100.0% lived in rural areas.

There were 2,966 households in the county, of which 22.3% had children under the age of 18 living with them and 27.1% had a female householder with no spouse or partner present. About 27.9% of all households were made up of individuals and 14.7% had someone living alone who was 65 years of age or older.

There were 3,245 housing units, of which 8.6% were vacant. Among occupied housing units, 81.5% were owner-occupied and 18.5% were renter-occupied. The homeowner vacancy rate was 0.7% and the rental vacancy rate was 2.5%.

=== 2010 Census ===
As of the 2010 United States census, there were 7,256 people living in the county.

As of the census of 2000, there were 6,926 people, 2,670 households, and 1,975 families living in the county. The population density was 38 people per square mile (15 people/km^{2}). There were 2,895 housing units at an average density of 16 units per square mile (6.2 units/km^{2}). The racial makeup of the county was 54.85% Black or African American, 35.66% White, 7.84% Native American, 0.10% Asian, 0.17% from other races, and 1.37% from two or more races. 0.65% of the population were Hispanic or Latino of any race.

There were 2,670 households, out of which 27.50% had children under the age of 18 living with them, 53.60% were married couples living together, 15.20% had a female householder with no husband present, and 26.00% were non-families. 22.50% of all households were made up of individuals, and 8.40% had someone living alone who was 65 years of age or older. The average household size was 2.59 and the average family size was 3.02.

In the county, the population was spread out, with 22.10% under the age of 18, 7.50% from 18 to 24, 28.90% from 25 to 44, 28.80% from 45 to 64, and 12.60% who were 65 years of age or older. The median age was 40 years. For every 100 females there were 96.30 males. For every 100 females age 18 and over, there were 94.80 males.

The median income for a household in the county was $42,745, and the median income for a family was $49,361. Males had a median income of $32,402 versus $26,000 for females. The per capita income for the county was $19,182. 10.60% of the population and 8.00% of families were below the poverty line. Out of the total people living in poverty, 13.00% are under the age of 18 and 18.50% are 65 or older.

== Economy ==
=== Tourism ===
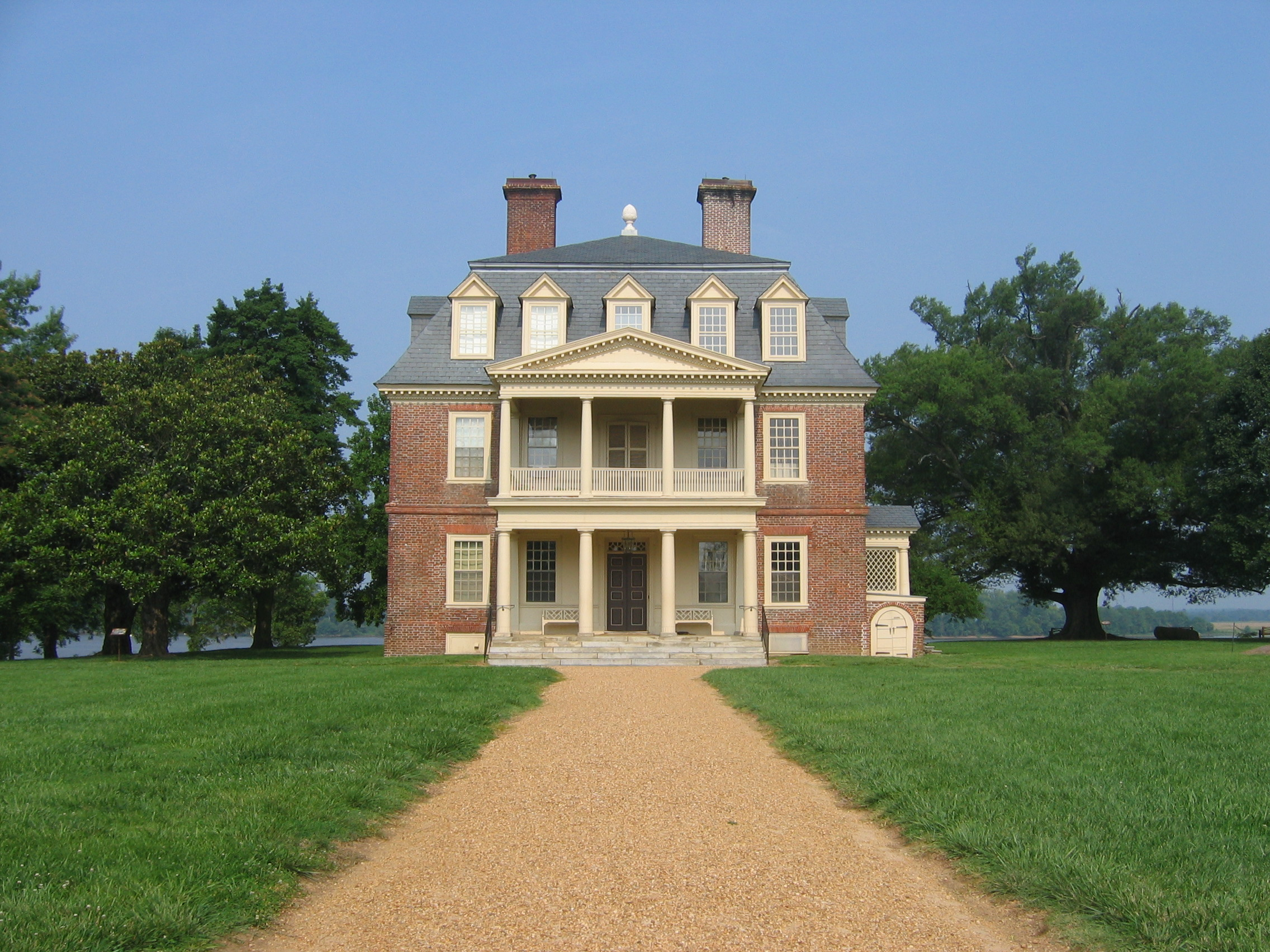
Shirley Plantation, one of the James River plantations in Charles City County

Charles City County features some of the larger and older of the extant James River plantations along State Route 5. All are privately owned. Many of the houses and/or grounds are open daily to visitors with various admission fees applicable, and more may be open during Garden Week, usually in late April.

Some James River plantations open to the public, listed from west to east, include Shirley Plantation, Edgewood Plantation and Harrison's Mill, Berkeley Plantation, Westover Plantation, Belle Air Plantation, Piney Grove at Southall's Plantation, North Bend Plantation, and Sherwood Forest Plantation. Plantations not open to the public include Evelynton Plantation, Oak Hill, and Greenway Plantation.

=== Agriculture ===
Some Charles City County farms along the James River have been under continuous crop production for more than 400 years, but they remain highly productive. Local farmers have won national contests in bushel per acre grain production. A Charles City farmer has been the National Corn Grower in three years, producing 300+ bushels of corn per acre (18.8 t/ha) in the "no-till non-irrigated" category. Two Charles City farmers have won the National Wheat Growers First Place, producing 140+ bushels per acre (9.4 t/ha) of soft red winter wheat.

Charles City County farmers have also helped develop the leading technology for controlling runoff from grain cultivation. Fully 90% of crop land in Charles City County is in a never-till cropping system. When Hurricane Floyd in 1999 dropped approximately 19 inches (480 mm) of rain in 24 hours on some long-term never-till fields, visual observation showed virtually no erosion. A scientific study conducted in 2000 on one long-term never-till field demonstrated a 99.9% reduction in sediment runoff compared to conventional tillage, and a 95% reduction of runoff of nitrogen and phosphorus. This new technology could become a primary strategy to achieve a healthy Chesapeake Bay.

== Government ==
The county is one of two in the state with 3 members of its Board of Supervisors. On April 14, 2026, its citizens approved a referendum to transition to the county board form of government, which would add an additional member to its Board of Supervisors.

=== Board of Supervisors ===
- District I: Ryan Patterson (I) (Vice Chairman)
- District II: Michael Hill (I) (Board Member)
- District III: Byron M. Adkins Sr. (Chairman)

=== Constitutional officers ===
- Circuit Court Clerk: Victoria Washington (I)
- Commissioner of the Revenue: Candice Jones (I)
- Commonwealth's Attorney: Tyler Klink (I)
- Sheriff: Jayson T. Crawley (I)
- Treasurer: Kourtney Brown (I)

=== Elected representatives ===
Charles City County is represented by Democrat Lashrecse Aird in the 13th district of the Senate of Virginia, and Democrat Delores McQuinn in the 81st district of the Virginia House of Delegates. On the federal level, the County is represented by Democrat Jennifer McClellan in Virginia's 4th congressional district in the U.S. House of Representatives, and by Democratic senators Tim Kaine and Mark Warner in the U.S. Senate.

== Cities and towns ==
The county has no "City", or any centralized city or town. Charles City Court House, which has a Charles City postal address, is the focal point of government. The building that served as the courthouse was constructed in the 1730s. Used until 2007, it was one of only five courthouses in America that was in continuous use for judicial purposes since before the Revolutionary War. A new courthouse has since been built.

== Transportation ==
Only Henrico County to the west is accessible without a river crossing. State Route 106 crosses the James River on the Benjamin Harrison Memorial Bridge, providing the only direct access to areas south of the river and to Hopewell, the closest city. Three bridges across the Chickahominy River link the county with neighboring James City County and Providence Forge in New Kent County.

=== Major highways ===
- SR 5
- SR 106
- SR 155
- SR 156

== Education ==
Charles City County Public Schools employs a staff of approximately 100 persons to meet the needs of approximately 500 students in its two schools. All schools are technologically advanced with full wireless Internet access in both labs and classrooms. The school system strives to serve the whole child by offering students a broad spectrum of programs that includes core studies, electives gifted education, honors, dual enrollment, Advanced Placement, Army Junior ROTC, comprehensive vocational and technical programs, exceptional education programs, Title I reading, alternative education, pre-kindergarten program, and regional Governor's School program participation.

== Politics ==
Charles City County has favored the Democratic candidate in each of the last seventeen presidential elections, during which the Democratic candidate has always received over fifty-four percent of the vote from the county. It was the only county or independent city in Virginia won by George McGovern during the 1972 election, when in fact, Charles City proved McGovern’s fourth strongest county nationwide.

United States presidential election results for Charles City County, Virginia
Year	Republican		Democratic		Third party(ies)	
Year	No.	%	No.	%	No.	%
1912	37	20.44%	121	66.85%	23	12.71%
1916	57	28.93%	139	70.56%	1	0.51%
1920	82	40.59%	119	58.91%	1	0.50%
1924	82	35.34%	141	60.78%	9	3.88%
1928	207	66.35%	105	33.65%	0	0.00%
1932	85	25.37%	245	73.13%	5	1.49%
1936	79	25.32%	233	74.68%	0	0.00%
1940	92	27.88%	238	72.12%	0	0.00%
1944	139	29.89%	326	70.11%	0	0.00%
1948	167	33.60%	258	51.91%	72	14.49%
1952	342	40.24%	492	57.88%	16	1.88%
1956	661	72.08%	174	18.97%	82	8.94%
1960	337	34.96%	623	64.63%	4	0.41%
1964	323	23.96%	1,023	75.89%	2	0.15%
1968	320	16.33%	1,457	74.34%	183	9.34%
1972	535	30.84%	1,177	67.84%	23	1.33%
1976	439	22.50%	1,455	74.58%	57	2.92%
1980	506	23.74%	1,564	73.39%	61	2.86%
1984	776	30.03%	1,776	68.73%	32	1.24%
1988	826	30.59%	1,839	68.11%	35	1.30%
1992	729	24.19%	2,010	66.69%	275	9.12%
1996	729	26.16%	1,842	66.09%	216	7.75%
2000	1,023	33.37%	1,981	64.61%	62	2.02%
2004	1,254	36.46%	2,155	62.66%	30	0.87%
2008	1,288	31.01%	2,838	68.34%	27	0.65%
2012	1,396	32.99%	2,772	65.50%	64	1.51%
2016	1,476	35.94%	2,496	60.77%	135	3.29%
2020	1,761	39.65%	2,624	59.09%	56	1.26%
2024	1,917	44.04%	2,384	54.77%	52	1.19%

== Communities ==
There are no incorporated towns in Charles City County, but the following unincorporated communities are located in the county:

=== Census-designated place ===
- Charles City

=== Other unincorporated communities ===
- Adkins Store
- Barnetts
- Berkeley
- Binns Hall
- Greenway
- Holdcroft
- Kimages
- Montpelier
- Mount Airy
- New Hope
- Old Union
- Roxbury
- Ruthville
- Sandy Point
- Sterling
- Tettington
- Wayside
- Westover Plantation
- Wilcox Neck

== Notable people ==
- William Henry Harrison, 9th president of the United States
- John Tyler, 10th president of the United States
- John Tyler Sr., 15th governor of Virginia, father of John Tyler
- Stephen Bates, first Black sheriff in Vermont
- Alec Seward, blues musician
- Lott Cary, founding father of the country of Liberia
- James Bradby, first Black sheriff in Virginia since the Reconstruction Era
- James Hemings, first American to train as a chef in France

== See also ==
- Charles City Shire
- City Point, Virginia
- Bermuda Hundred, Virginia
- Chickahominy river
