= Charles City, Virginia =

Unincorporated community in Virginia, US

- Unincorporated community Census-designated place
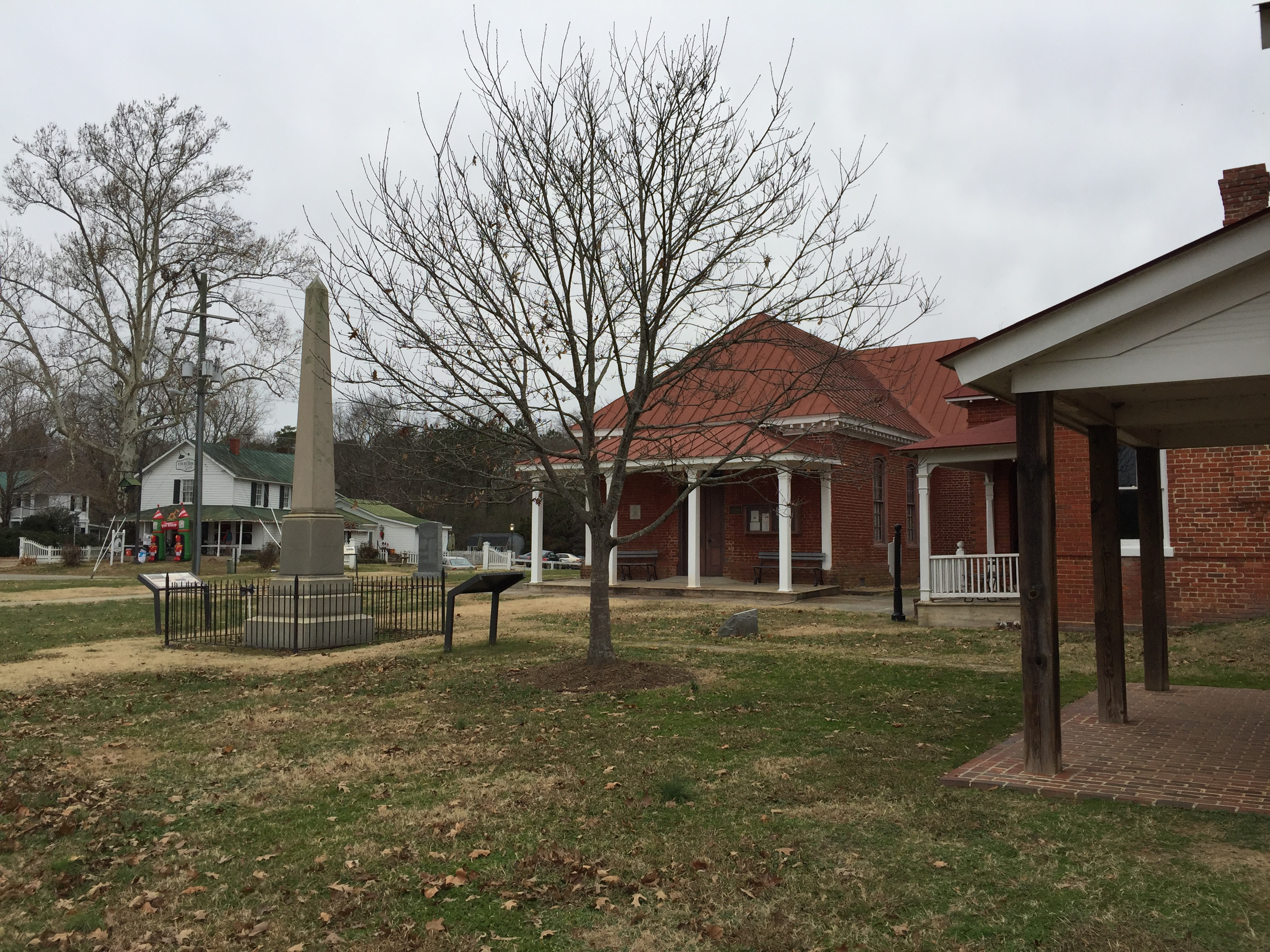
- Charles City, 2017, showing the Confederate monument and the historic Charles City County Courthouse

- Location in Virginia
- Coordinates: 37°20′37″N 77°4′16″W
- Country: United States
- State: Virginia
- County: Charles City

Area
  - Total: 2.748 sq mi (7.12 km^{2})
  - Land: 2.702 sq mi (7.00 km^{2})
  - Water: 0.046 sq mi (0.12 km^{2})
- Elevation: 23 ft (7.0 m)

Population (2020)
  - Total: 104
  - Density: 38.5/sq mi (14.9/km^{2})
- Time zone: UTC−5 (Eastern (EST))
  - Summer (DST): UTC−4 (EDT)
- ZIP code: 23030
- FIPS code: 51-14904
- GNIS feature ID: 1498561

Charles City is an unincorporated community and census-designated place (CDP) in Charles City County, Virginia, United States. It is the county seat of Charles City County. The population as of the 2020 census was 104.

== Geography ==
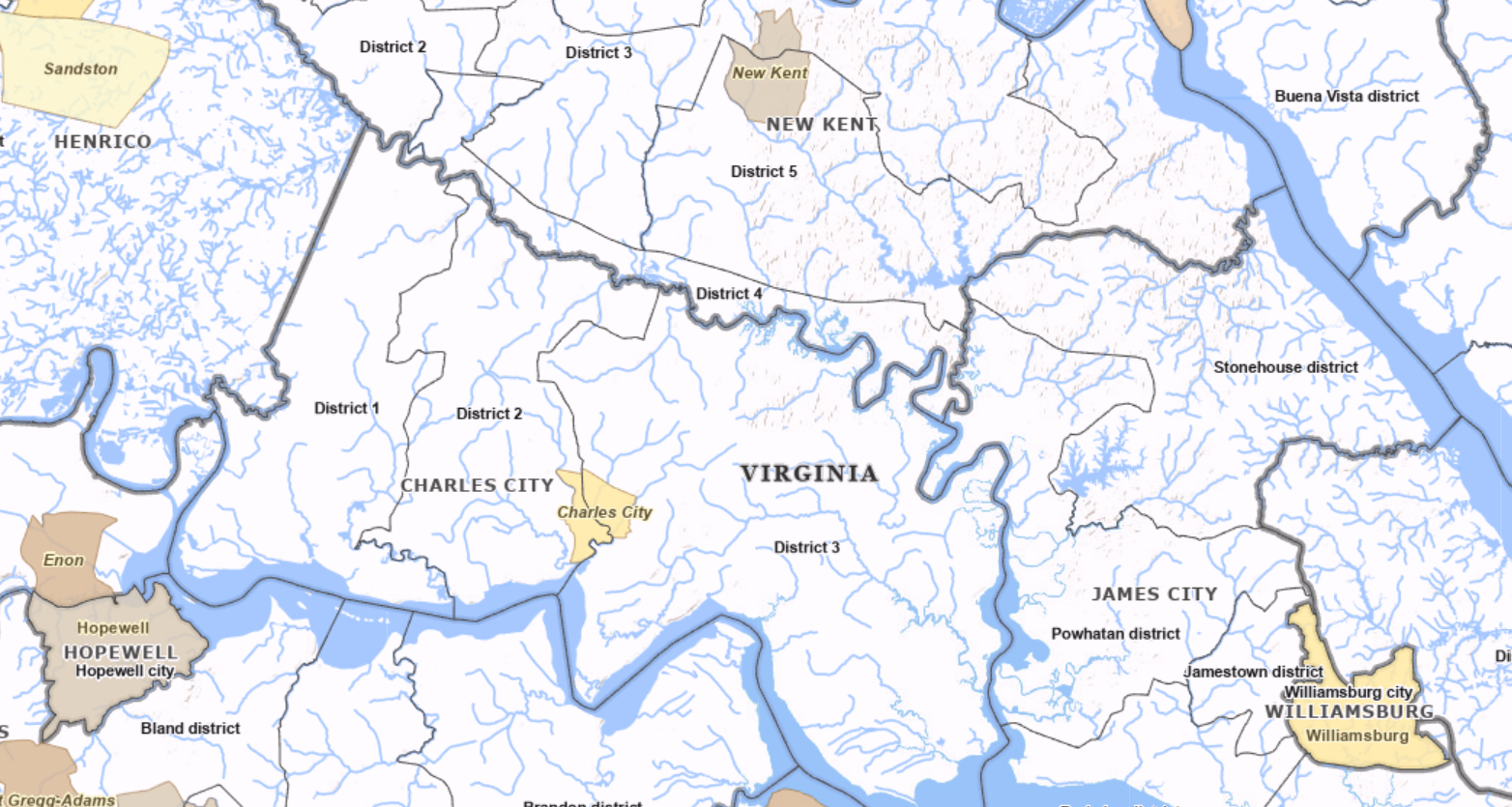
Map of Charles City

The community is centered on the Charles City County Court House, from which it takes its variant names Charles City Court House and Charles City Courthouse. Charles City lies at the intersection of State Routes 5 and 155. It is 30 miles (48 km) southeast of Richmond, 17 miles (27 km) east of Hopewell, 23 miles (37 km) west of Williamsburg, and about 2 miles (3 km) north of the James River.

== History ==
The area was originally populated by the Chickahominy, Paspahegh and Weyanock Native Americans followed by English settlers in 1607 and 20 enslaved Africans in 1618. After the Virginia Company founded Charles Cittie in 1619 as on of the first four "boroughs" Virginia, courthouses were successively built along the James River at Westover, then City Point and in the 1750s in the town of Charles City. The original Charles City County Courthouse remains today. Charles City serves as the central hub for local government in the county and as a central node for services including a library, bank, post office, and local schools.

== Demographics ==
Historical population
Census	Pop.	Note	%±
2010	133		—
2020	104		−21.8%
U.S. Decennial Census; 2010 2020

Charles City was first listed as a census designated place in the 2010 US census.

=== Racial and ethnic composition ===
Charles City city, Virginia – Racial and ethnic composition Note: the US Census treats Hispanic/Latino as an ethnic category. This table excludes Latinos from the racial categories and assigns them to a separate category. Hispanics/Latinos may be of any race.
Race / Ethnicity (NH = Non-Hispanic)	Pop 2010	Pop 2020	% 2010	% 2020
White alone (NH)	59	37	44.36%	35.58%
Black or African American alone (NH)	72	53	54.14%	50.96%
Native American or Alaska Native alone (NH)	0	1	0.00%	0.96%
Asian alone (NH)	0	3	0.00%	2.88%
Native Hawaiian or Pacific Islander alone (NH)	0	0	0.00%	0.00%
Other race alone (NH)	0	5	0.00%	4.81%
Mixed race or Multiracial (NH)	2	5	1.50%	4.81%
Hispanic or Latino (any race)	0	0	0.00%	0.00%
Total	133	104	100.00%	100.00%

== Notable people ==
- Susan Wise Bauer, writer and historian
- Lott Cary, first black Baptist missionary to Africa
- Benjamin Harrison V, signer of the Declaration of Independence
- Martha Jefferson, First Lady of Virginia and wife of Thomas Jefferson
- John Tyler, US president
- Freeman Walker, US senator from Georgia
- William Henry Harrison, US president
