= List of historic houses in Virginia =

Many historic houses in Virginia are notable sites. The U.S. state of Virginia was home to many of America's Founding Fathers, four of the first five U.S. presidents, and many important figures of the Confederacy. As one of the earliest locations of European settlement in America, Virginia has some of the oldest buildings in the nation.

== List of historic houses in Virginia ==
A listing includes the date of the start of construction where known.

== A–G ==
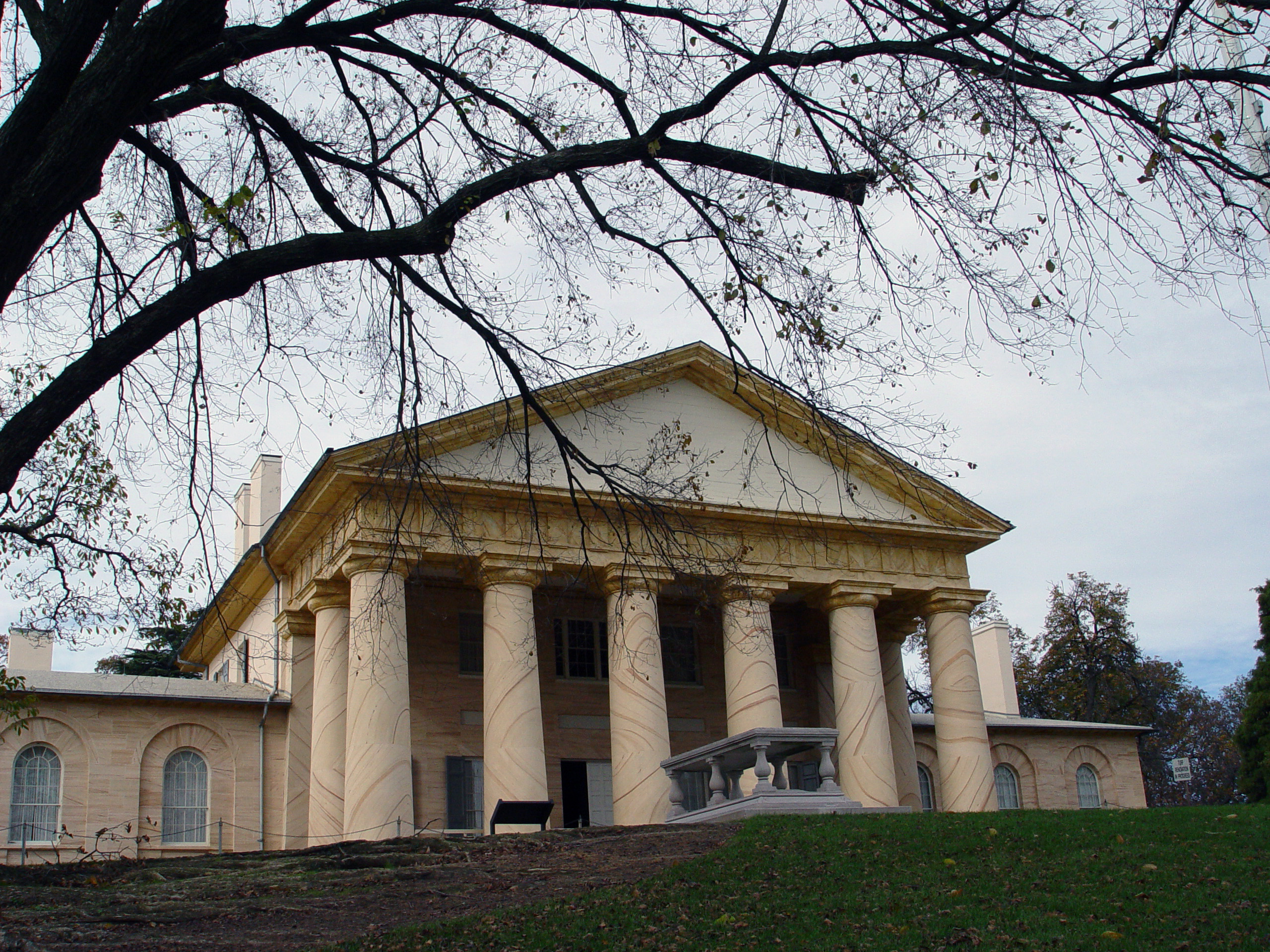
Arlington House, 1802

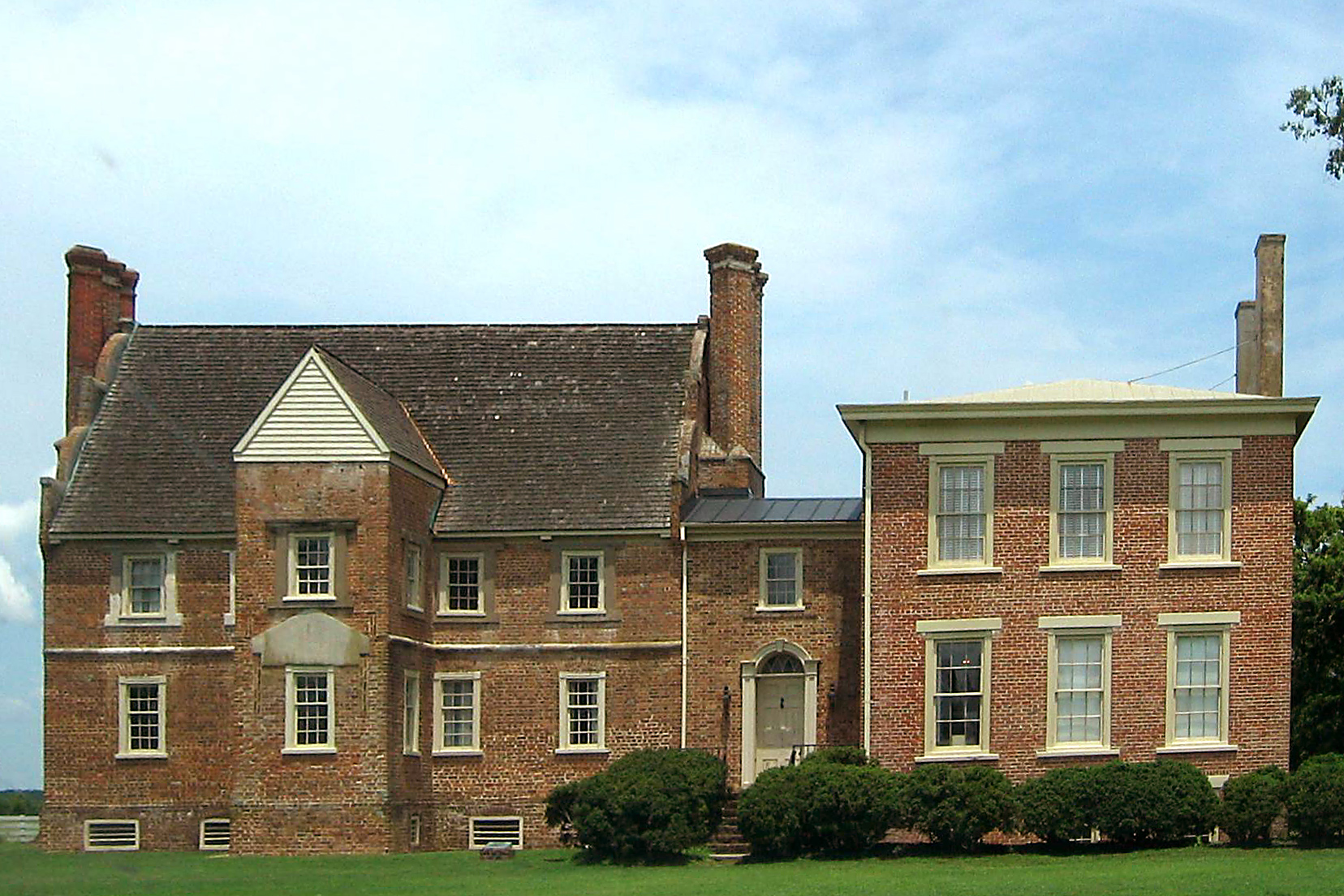
Bacon's Castle, . Vernon, 1741

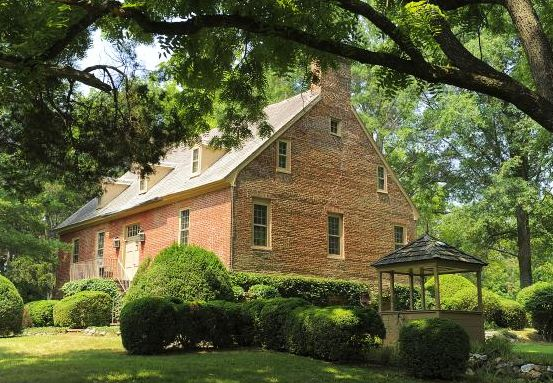
Bel Air Plantation, 1740

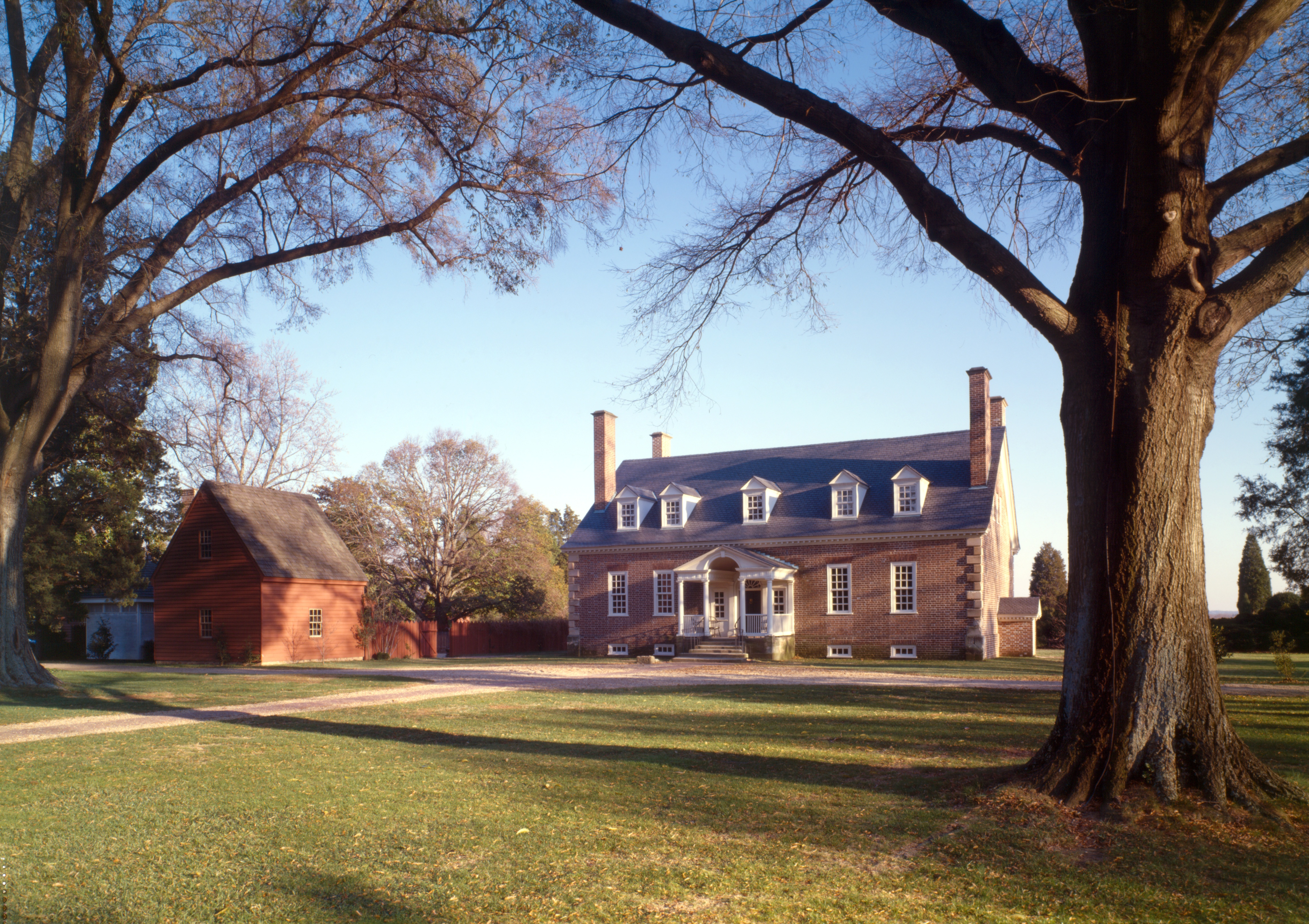
Gunston Hall, 1755

- Aberdeen c. 1800
- Adam Thoroughgood House, c. 1719
- Agecroft Hall, late 15th century, Lancashire, England – English Tudor manor house transplanted to Richmond and reconstructed by Thomas C. Williams, Jr. in 1925
- The Anchorage 1749, Northumberland County
- Ampthill 1730, Richmond – built by Henry Cary, Jr. and was later owned by Colonel Archibald Cary
- Arlington House (the Custis-Lee Mansion), 1802, Arlington County – home of Robert E. Lee
- Ash Grove, 1790, Fairfax County – home of Thomas Fairfax, and Henry Fairfax
- Ash Lawn–Highland, 1799, Albemarle County – home of James Monroe
- Bacon's Castle, 1665, Surry County – only Jacobean great houses in the U.S.; used as a stronghold in Bacon's Rebellion
- Ball-Sellers House (Arlington, Virginia) built in 1742 by John Ball, owned by the Arlington Historical Society
- Bel Air Plantation, c. 1740, Prince William County – home of Parson Weems, the first biographer of George Washington and the creator of the cherry tree story
- Belle Air Plantation, c. 1700, Charles City County
- Bell House, 1882, Westmoreland County – summer home of Alexander Graham Bell
- Belle Grove, 1790s, Pittsylvania County – a Federal style home owned by the Whitmell P. Tunstall family
- Belle Grove, 1790, King George County – a house in Port Conway; birthplace of James Madison
- Bellwood, c. 1800, Chesterfield County – former plantation house; now serves as the officer's club at Defense Supply Center Richmond
- Belle Grove, 1797, Frederick County – a house in Middletown, home of Dolley Madison's sister; a National Trust Historic Site
- Belroi home, Belroi – birthplace of Walter Reed
- Belvoir, 1741, Fairfax County – home of Colonel William Fairfax, Bryan Fairfax, Sally Fairfax
- Berkeley Plantation, 1726, Charles City County – home of the Harrison family (Benjamin Harrison V; birthplace of William Henry Harrison)
- Berry Hill Plantation, 1835, Halifax County – home of the Bruce family
- Brandon Plantation, c. 1765, Prince George County – home of the Harrison family
- Brompton, 1824, Fredericksburg – 19th-century mansion, home of the president of the University of Mary Washington
- Brush-Everard House, 1718, Williamsburg
- Carlyle House, 1753, Alexandria – home of John Carlyle, Scottish merchant
- Carter's Grove, 1755, James City County – home of the Burwell family
- Castle Hill, 1764, Albemarle County – home of Thomas Walker (explorer) and William Cabell Rives
- Chatham Manor, 1768, Stafford County – home of William Fitzhugh
- Court Manor, c. 1812, Rockingham County – early Greek-Revival manor house; former home of Willis Sharpe Kilmer
- Dodona Manor, c. 1805, Loudoun County – home of General George C. Marshall
- Evergreen, c. 1800, Prince George County – birthplace of Edmund Ruffin
- Frascati, 1821, Orange County – home of U.S. Supreme Court justice Philip P. Barbour
- Ferry Plantation House c. 1830, Virginia Beach – Civil War home of USN/CSN Cmdr. Charles Fleming McIntosh
- Foxton Cottage, c. 1734, Taylorstown historic district
- Green Spring Plantation, James City County – home of governor Sir William Berkeley site of Bacon's Rebellion, ruins
- Greenway Plantation c. 1776, Charles City County – birthplace of U.S. President John Tyler
- The Governor's Palace, Williamsburg – home of Virginia's colonial governors, reconstruction
- Gunston Hall, 1755, Fairfax County – home of George Mason
- Hartwood Manor, 1848, Hartwood – an unusual example of Gothic Revival architecture, constructed by Julia and Ariel Foote

== H–M ==
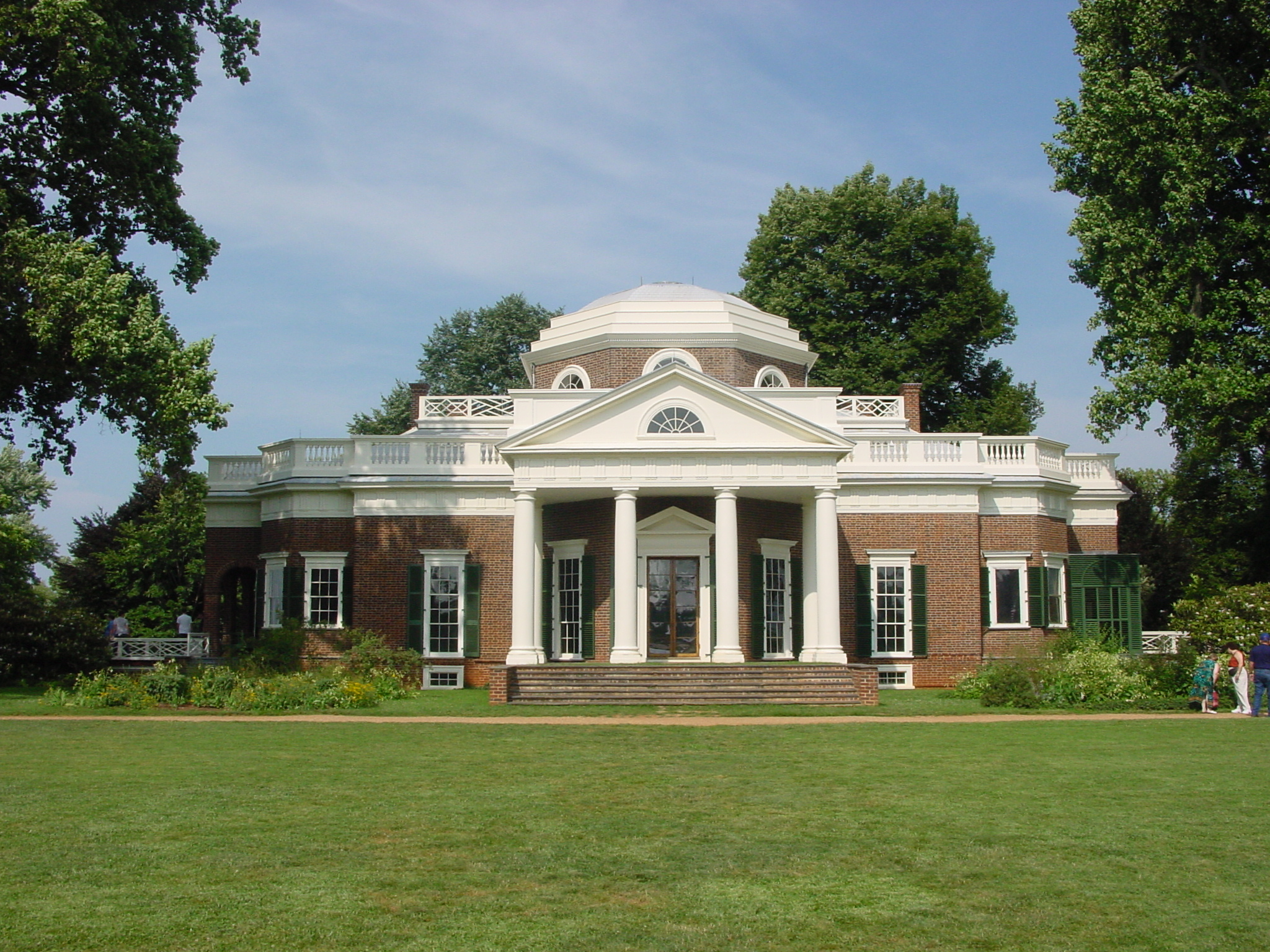
Monticello, 1768

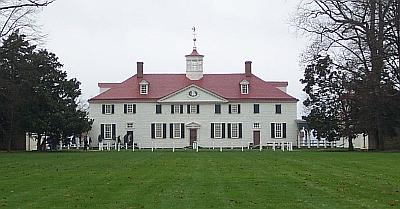
Mt. Vernon, 1741

- Hidden Springs, 1804, Rockingham County – home of the John Hite II
- The John Marshall House, 1790, Richmond – home of John Marshall
- Hunting Quarter, c. 1770s, Sussex County, Virginia, Home of Captain Henry Harrison (c. 1736 – 1772), son of Benjamin Harrison IV of Berkeley, brother of Benjamin Harrison V and uncle of William Henry Harrison.
- Kenmore Plantation, 1770s, Fredericksburg – home of George Washington's sister Betty Lewis
- Kittiewan, c. 1750, Charles City County – home of Dr. William Rickman.
- Long Branch Plantation, 1811, Clarke County, home of the Nelson family
- Lowland Cottage, 1666, Gloucester County – home of Robert Bristow
- The Manse, 1846, City of Staunton – birthplace of Woodrow Wilson
- Marlbourne, 1840, Hanover County – home of Edmund Ruffin
- The Matthew Jones House, c. 1725, Newport News
- Maymont, 1893, Richmond – home of James H. Dooley
- Monticello, 1768, Albemarle County – home of Thomas Jefferson
- Montpelier, c. 1764, Orange County – home of James Madison; National Trust Historic Site
- Moor Green, 1815, Prince William County – home of Howson Hooe; a national- and Virginia-designated historic site
- Morven Park, 1781, Loudoun County – home of Governor Westmorland Davis and location of the founding of Southern Planter (now Southern Living) magazine
- Mount Vernon, 1741, Fairfax County – home of Lawrence Washington and his half-brother George Washington

== N–Z ==
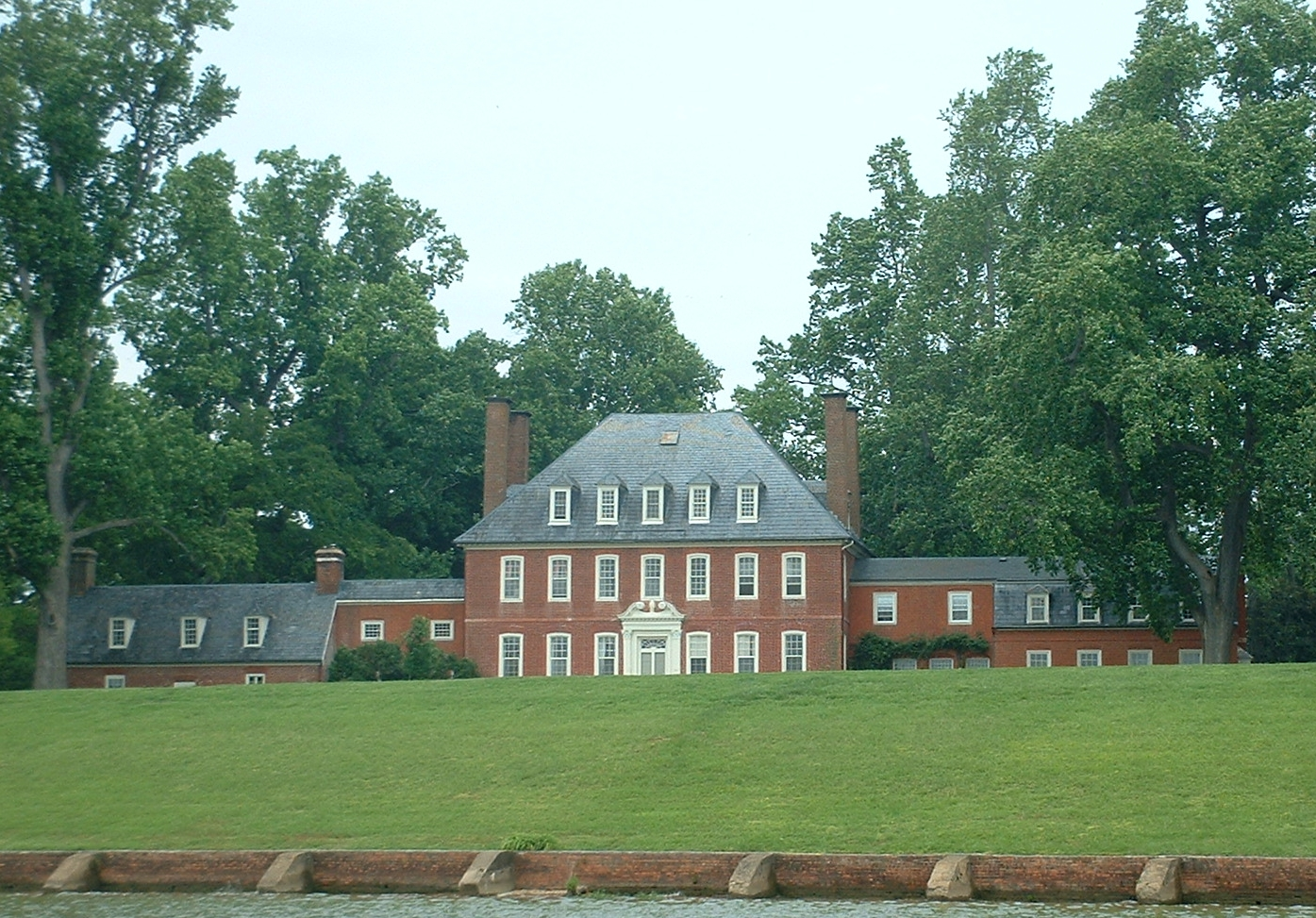
Westover Plantation, c. 1755

- North Bend Plantation, 1819, Charles City County – family home of the Harrison family
- Oak Hill, 1822, Loudoun County – home of James Monroe after Ash Lawn-Highland
- Oatlands, 1804, Loudoun County – plantation belonging to the Carters of Virginia, a National Trust Historic Site
- Old Mansion, c. 1669, Caroline County – home of the Hoome family
- The Peyton Randolph House, 1715, Williamsburg – home of Peyton Randolph
- Piney Grove at Southall's Plantation, c. 1790, Charles City County – home of the Southall family
- Pleasant Point, 1724–1765, Surry County, patented in 1657 – home of the Edwards family
- Poplar Forest, 1806, Bedford County – retreat home of Thomas Jefferson
- Red Hill, reconstruction, Charlotte County – last home and death site of Patrick Henry
- Rippon Lodge, c. 1747, Prince William County – home of the Blackburn family
- Rockledge Mansion, built in 1758 by William Buckland at Occoquan, Prince William County – home of John Ballendine, the founder of Occuquan
- Russell House and Store, early-19th-century house and store at Dale City
- Sara Myers House, 1790, Old Town District of Fredericksburg
- Selma Plantation House, 1811, Loudoun County – Leesburg
- Scotchtown, c. 1730, Hanover County – home of Patrick Henry
- Seven Springs, c. 1725, King William County – home of the Dabney family
- Sherwood Forest, c. 1720, Charles City County – home of John Tyler
- Shirley Plantation, 1723, Charles City County – home of the Carter family
- Stratford Hall Plantation, 1730, Westmoreland County – home of the Lee family (Thomas Lee; birthplace of Richard Henry Lee and Robert E. Lee)
- Smith's Fort Plantation, 1761, Surry County – home to Jacob Faulcon and his family
- Swannanoa, 1912, Augusta County – retreat home of James H. Dooley
- Thorpeland, c. 1700s, York County – built on land patented by Christopher Calthorpe in 1631
- Tree Hill, c. 1800, Henrico County
- Upper Brandon, 1825, Prince George County – home of William Byrd Harrison of the Harrison family
- Wakefield, Westmoreland County – birthplace of George Washington, recreation
- Westover, c. 1755, Charles City County – family home of the Byrds (William Byrd II)
- White House of the Confederacy, 1818, Richmond – used as Confederacy President Jefferson Davis's executive mansion during the Civil War
- Wilton House, 1753, Richmond – home of the Randolph family (William Randolph III)
- Wilton Plantation, 1763, Middlesex – home of the Churchill family
- Woodlawn, 1805, Fairfax County – home of George Washington's niece and nephew; a National Trust Historic Site
- Wythe House, 1754, Williamsburg – home of George Wythe

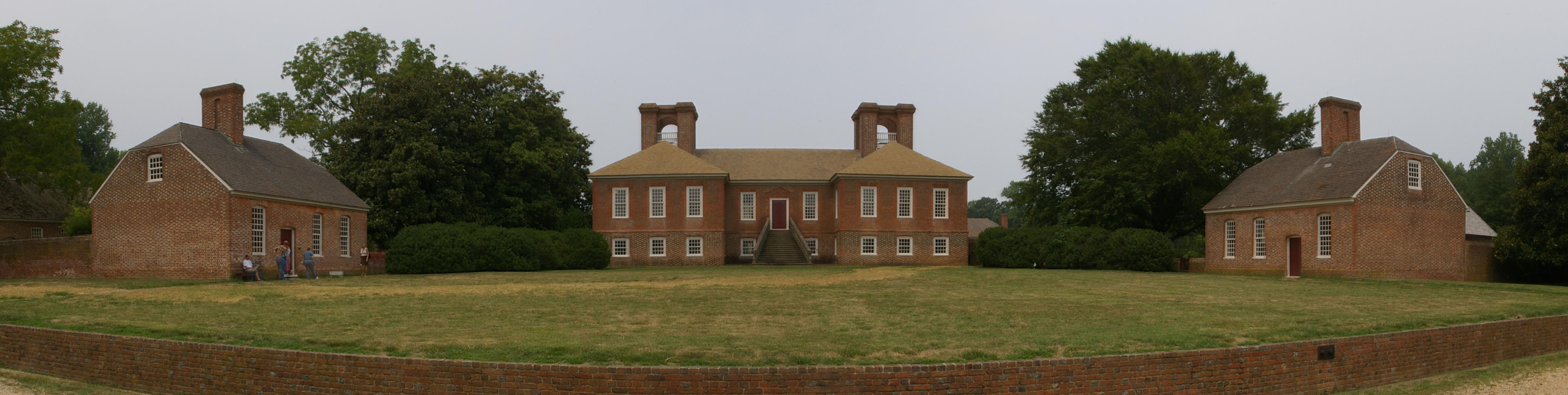
Stratford Hall Plantation, 1730

== See also ==
- List of National Historic Landmarks in Virginia
- List of Registered Historic Places in Virginia
- List of the oldest buildings in Virginia
