= William L. Yancey =

American politician (1814–1863)

William Lowndes Yancey
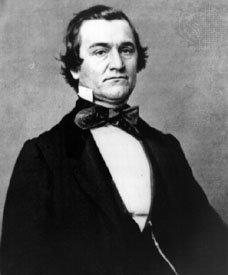

Confederate States Senator from Alabama
- In office February 18, 1862 – July 27, 1863
- Preceded by: New constituency
- Succeeded by: Robert Jemison

Member of the U.S. House of Representatives from Alabama's 3rd district
- In office December 2, 1844 – September 1, 1846
- Preceded by: Dixon Lewis
- Succeeded by: James Cottrell

Personal details
- Born: August 10, 1814 Warren County, Georgia, U.S.
- Died: July 27, 1863 (aged 48) Montgomery, Alabama, C.S.
- Party: Democratic
- Education: Williams College

William Lowndes Yancey (August 10, 1814 – July 27, 1863) was an American politician in the Antebellum South. As an influential "Fire-Eater", he defended slavery and urged Southerners to secede from the Union in response to Northern antislavery agitation.

Though a critic of John C. Calhoun at the time of the Nullification Crisis of 1832–33, in the late 1830s, Yancey began to identify with Calhoun, and, by 1849, Yancey was a firm supporter of Calhoun's "Southern Address" and an adamant opponent of the Compromise of 1850. Throughout the 1850s, Yancey demonstrated an ability to hold large audiences under his spell for hours at a time and was sometimes referred to as the "Orator of Secession". At the 1860 Democratic National Convention, he was instrumental in splitting the party into Northern and Southern factions as a leading opponent of Stephen A. Douglas and the concept of popular sovereignty. He used the phrase "squatter sovereignty" in a speech he gave at the convention to describe popular sovereignty.

During the American Civil War, Yancey was appointed by Confederate President Jefferson Davis to head a diplomatic delegation to Europe in the attempt to secure formal recognition of Southern independence. In these efforts, Yancey was unsuccessful and frustrated. Upon his return to America in 1862, Yancey was elected to the Confederate States Senate, where he was a frequent critic of the Davis Administration. Suffering from ill health for much of his life, Yancey died during the Civil War, in July 1863, at the age of 48.

== Early life ==
Yancey's mother, Caroline Bird (1790–1859), lived on her family's plantation (nicknamed "the Aviary") located near the falls of the Ogeechee River in Warren County, Georgia. On December 8, 1808, she married Benjamin Cudworth Yancey, a lawyer in South Carolina who had served on the USS Constellation during the Quasi-War with France. William Lowndes Yancey was born at the Aviary on August 10, 1814. Three years later, on October 26, 1817, his father died of yellow fever.

Yancey's widowed mother married the Reverend Nathan Sydney Smith Beman on April 23, 1821. Beman had temporarily relocated to South Carolina to operate Mt. Zion Academy, where William was a student. In the spring of 1823, the entire family moved when Reverend Beman took a position at the First Presbyterian Church in Troy, New York. Beman worked with Reverend Charles G. Finney in the free-school movement, and became involved with abolitionism in the 1830s through contacts with Theodore Dwight Ward and Lyman Beecher.

Beman's marriage was marred by domestic unrest and spousal abuse that led to serious considerations of divorce and, finally, a permanent separation in 1835. This atmosphere affected the children and caused William to reject many of his step-father's teachings. Yancey's biographer, historian Eric H. Walther, speculates the character of Yancey's later career was a result of low self-esteem and a search for public adulation and approval that went back to his childhood experiences with Reverend Beman.

In the fall of 1830, Yancey was enrolled at Williams College in northwestern Massachusetts. The 16-year-old Yancey was admitted as a sophomore based on the required entrance examinations. At Williams, he participated in the debating society and for a short time was the editor of a student newspaper. In the autumn of 1832, Yancey took his first steps as a politician by working on the campaign for Whig Ebenezer Emmons. Overall, Yancey had a successful stay at Williams academically that was marred only by frequent disciplinary problems. Despite being selected as the Senior Orator by his class, Yancey left the school in the spring of 1833, six weeks before graduation.

== Early career ==
Yancey returned to the South, relocating to Greenville, South Carolina. He originally lived on his uncle's plantation, where he served as a bookkeeper. The uncle, Robert Cunningham, was a strong unionist, as were most of Yancey's family, including his birth father. On July 4, 1834, at a Fourth of July celebration, Yancey made a stirring nationalistic address in which he openly attacked the radicals of the state who were still talking secession from the repercussions of the Nullification Crisis:

Listen, not then, my countrymen, to the voice which whispers (for as yet, it does not raise itself above a whisper) that Americans, who have been knit together by so many cords of affection, can no longer be mutual worshippers at the Shrine of Freedom—no longer can exist together, citizens of the same Republic ...

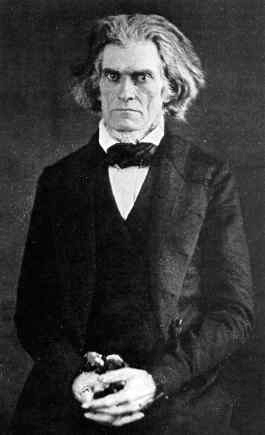
Portrait of John C. Calhoun. Yancey was critical of Calhoun in the 1830s, but he was fully supportive of Calhoun's defense of Southern institutions by the late 1840s.

As a result of Yancey's political activities, he was appointed editor of the Greenville Mountaineer in November 1834. As editor, he attacked both nullification and the chief architect of nullification, John C. Calhoun. Yancey compared Calhoun to Aaron Burr and referred to them as "two fallen arch angels—who have made efforts to tear down the battlements and safeguards of our country, that they might rule, the Demons of the Storm."

Yancey resigned from the newspaper on May 14, 1835. On August 13, married Sarah Caroline Earl. As his dowry, Yancey received 35 slaves and a quick entry into the planter class. In the winter of 1836–1837, Yancey again moved to her plantation in Alabama, near Cahaba (Dallas County). It was an inopportune time to relocate. As a result of the Panic of 1837, Yancey's financial position was seriously damaged by cotton prices that fell from fifteen cents a pound in 1835 to as low as five cents a pound in 1837.

In early 1838, Yancey took over the Cahaba Southern Democrat, and his first editorial was a strong defense of slavery. From his current economic perspective, Yancey began to identify the anti-slavery movement negatively with issues such as the establishment of a national bank, internal improvements, and the expansion of federal power. As the former nationalist moved to a states' rights position, Yancey also changed his attitude toward Calhoun — for example, by applauding Calhoun's role in the Gag rule debates. Yancey also began to attack Henry Clay for his support of the American Colonization Society, which Yancey equated with attacks on Southern slavery.

Yancey, like most members of the planter class, was a strong believer in a personal code of honor. In September 1838, Yancey returned for a brief return visit to Greenville. A political slur by Yancey in a private conversation was overheard by a teenage relative of the aggrieved party. Yancey was confronted by another relative (and his wife's uncle), Dr. Robinson Earle. Conversation turned to violence, and the always armed Yancey ended up killing the doctor in a street brawl. Yancey was tried and sentenced to a year in jail for manslaughter. An unrepentant Yancey was pardoned after only a few months, but, while incarcerated he wrote for his newspaper, "Reared with the spirit of a man in my bosom—and taught to preserve inviolate my honor—my character, and my person, I have acted as such a spirit dictated."

Yancey returned to his paper in March 1839, but sold it a couple of months later when he moved to Wetumpka in Elmore County, Alabama. While his intent was to resume his life as a planter, Yancey suffered a huge financial reversal when his slaves were poisoned as a result of a feud between Yancey's overseer and a neighboring overseer. Two of the slaves were killed, and most of the others were incapacitated for months. Unable to afford replacements, and burdened with other debts from his newspaper, Yancey was forced to sell most of the enslaved people as they recovered. Yancey did open in Wetumpka the Argus and Commercial Advertiser.

== Public office ==
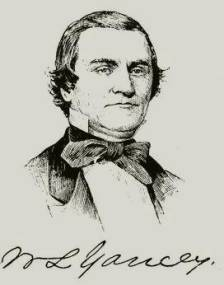
After serving in the Alabama Legislature in the 1840s and the United States House of Representatives from 1844 to 1846, Yancey held no public office until the Civil War.

Yancey was increasingly interested in politics, as his personal politics moved towards the most radical wing of the Southern Democratic Party. Influenced most by Dixon Hall Lewis, Yancey fell into a social and political circle that included political leaders of the state such as Thomas Mays, J. L. M. Curry, John A. Campbell, and John Gill Shorter. In April 1840, Yancey started a weekly campaign newsletter that supported Democrat Martin Van Buren over Whig William Henry Harrison in the 1840 presidential election while emphasizing that slavery should now be the most important political and economic concern of the South. While still not a secessionist, Yancey was also no longer an unconditional unionist.

He was elected in 1841 to the Alabama House of Representatives, in which he served for one year. Because of increasing debt, Yancey sold his newspaper in March 1842. Throughout his career as an editor, he had faced the problem of many fellow editors in obtaining and collecting on subscriptions and decided to open a law practice instead. In 1843, he ran for the Alabama Senate and was elected by a vote of 1,115 to 1,025. His special concern in this election was the effort being made by Whigs to determine apportionment in the state legislature based on the "federal ratio" of each slave counting as three-fifths of a person. At the time, only whites were counted by the state, and the change would have benefited the Whigs, who generally were the largest slaveholders. This type of conflict between large slaveholders and yeomen Alabamians would continue through the Alabama secession convention in 1861.

In 1844, Yancey was elected to the United States House of Representatives to fill a vacancy (winning with a 2,197 to 2,137 vote) and re-elected in 1845 (receiving over 4,000 votes as the Whigs did not even field a candidate). In Congress, his political ability and unusual oratorical gifts at once gained recognition. Yancey delivered his first speech on January 6, 1845, when he was selected by the Democrats to respond to a speech by Thomas Clingman, a Whig from North Carolina who had opposed Texas annexation. Clingman was offended by the tone of Yancey's speech, and, afterwards, Yancey refused to clarify that he had not intended to impugn Clingman's honor. Clingman challenged Yancey to a duel, and he accepted. The exchange of pistol fire occurred in nearby Beltsville, Maryland; neither combatant was injured.

In Congress, Yancey was an effective spokesman in opposing internal improvements and tariffs and supporting states' rights and the start of the Mexican–American War. More and more, he subscribed to conspiracy theories regarding Northern intentions, while helping to provide ammunition for those Northerners who were starting to believe in a slaveholders' conspiracy. In 1846, however, he resigned his seat, partly for financial reasons, and partly because of his disgust with the Northern Democrats, whom he accused of sacrificing their principles for economic interests.

== Alabama platform and address to the people of Alabama ==
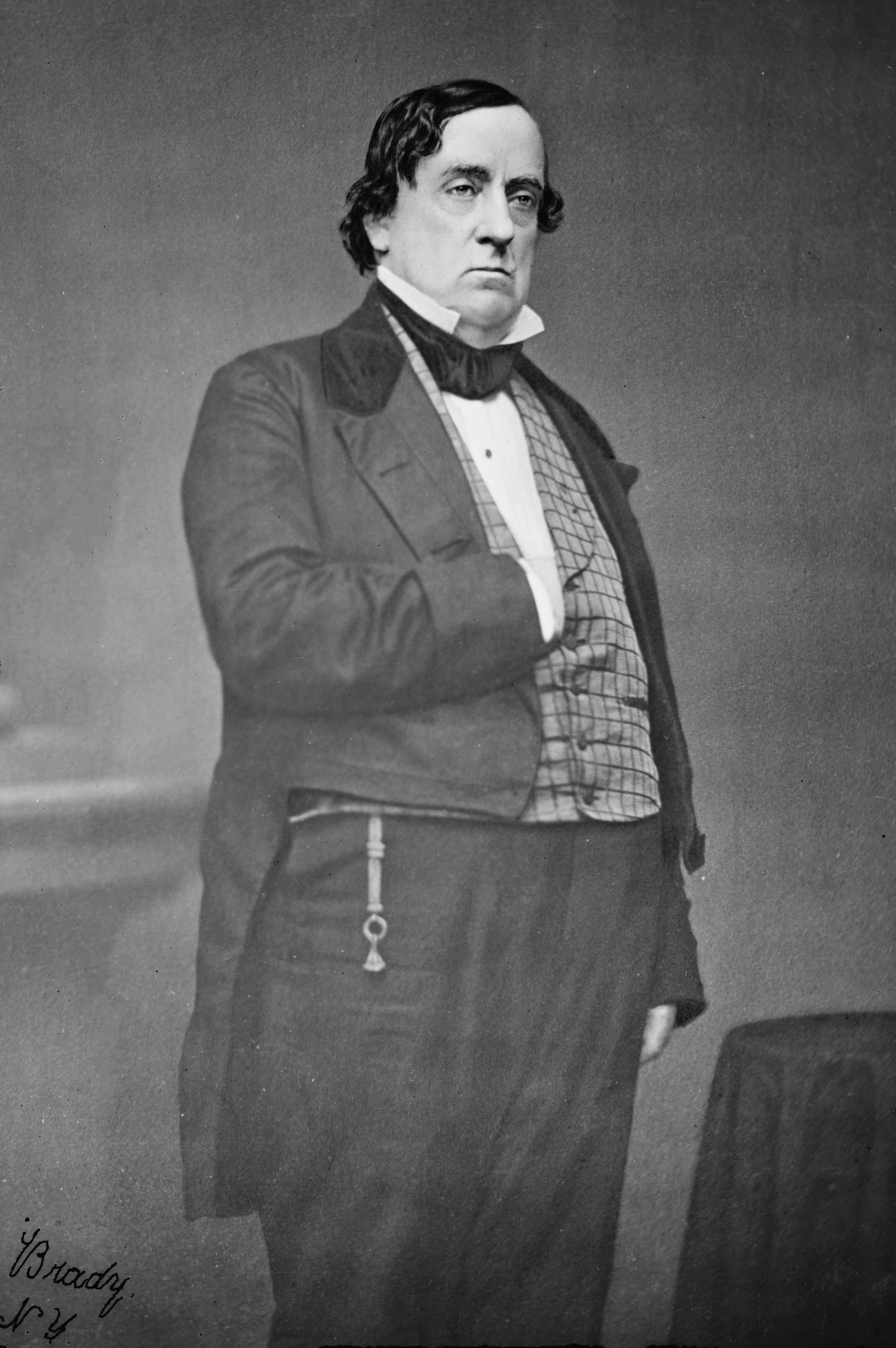
A portrait of Lewis Cass. The nomination of Cass for the 1848 Democratic Presidential nomination on a platform of popular sovereignty led Yancey to walk out of the convention.

Within a few months of his resignation, Yancey moved to Montgomery, where he purchased a 20-acre (81,000 m^{2}) dairy farm while establishing a law partnership with John A. Elmore. No longer a planter, Yancey still remained a slaveholder, owning 11 slaves in 1850, 14 by 1852, and 24 between 1858 and 1860. While he had suggested with his resignation that his active role in politics might be over, "perhaps forever", Yancey found this to be impossible.

Yancey recognized the significance to the South of the Wilmot Proviso and, in 1847, as the first talk of slaveholder Zachary Taylor as a presidential candidate surfaced, Yancey saw him as a possibility for bringing together a Southern political movement that would cross party lines. Yancey made it clear that his support for Taylor was conditional upon Taylor denouncing the Wilmot Proviso. However, Taylor announced that he would seek the Whig nomination, and, in December 1847, Lewis Cass of Michigan, the leading Democratic candidate, endorsed the policy of popular sovereignty.

With no available candidate sufficiently opposed to the Proviso, Yancey in 1848 secured the adoption by the state Democratic convention of the "Alabama Platform," which was endorsed by the legislatures of Alabama and Georgia and by Democratic state conventions in Florida and Virginia. The platform endorsed these proposals:

1. The Federal government could not restrict slavery in the territories.
2. Territories could not prohibit slavery until the point where they were meeting in convention to draft a state constitution in order to petition Congress for statehood.
3. Alabama delegates to the Democratic convention were to oppose any candidate supporting either the Wilmot Proviso or popular sovereignty (which allowed territories to exclude slavery at any point).
4. The federal government would have to overrule Mexican anti-slavery laws specifically in the Mexican Cession and actively protect slavery.

When the national convention was held in Baltimore, Cass was nominated on the fourth ballot. Yancey's proposal that the convention adopt the main points of the Alabama Platform was rejected by a 216–36 vote. Yancey and one other Alabama delegate left the convention in protest, and Yancey's efforts to stir up a third-party movement in the state failed.

The opening salvo in a new level of sectional conflict occurred on December 13, 1848, when Whig John G. Palfrey of Massachusetts introduced a bill to abolish slavery in the District of Columbia. Throughout the South in 1849, "the rhetoric of resistance to the North escalated and spread". Calhoun delivered his famous "Southern Address", but only 48 out of 121 Congressmen signed off on it. Yancey persuaded a June 1849 state Democratic Party meeting to endorse Calhoun's address and was instrumental in calling for the Nashville Convention scheduled for June 1850.

Yancey was opposed to both the Compromise of 1850 and the disappointing results of the Nashville Convention. The latter, rather than making a strong stand for secession as Yancey had hoped, simply advocated extending the Missouri Compromise Line to the Pacific Coast. Yancey helped create Southern Rights Associations (a concept that originated in South Carolina) in Alabama to pursue a secessionist agenda. A convention of these Alabama associations, held in February 1851, produced Yancey's radical "Address to the People of Alabama". The address began in this way:

The legacy of the old party organization had been to lead their members to avoid any decisive action on the great slavery question, and to wink and acquiesce in aggressions on the South rather than endanger party success by opposition to them.

The address hit all of the main points that would ultimately resurface in the secession during the winter of 1860–1861, especially the treatment of Southerners:

...as inferiors in the Union—as degraded by your contact with slaves, and as unworthy of an association with the Northern man in the great work of extending the institution of slavery over the vast plains of the West.

Despite the efforts of Yancey, the popularity of the Compromise of 1850, the failure of the Nashville Convention, and the acceptance of the more moderate Georgia Platform by much of the South led to unionist victories in Alabama and most of the South. Yancey's third-party support for George Troup of Georgia on a Southern-rights platform drew only 2,000 votes.

== Road to secession ==
Yancey continued to support the most radical Southern positions and is generally included as one of a group of Southerners referred to as "Fire-Eaters." Historian Emory Thomas notes that Yancey, along with Edmund Ruffin and Robert Barnwell Rhett, "remained in the secessionist forefront longest and loudest." Thomas characterized the whole Fire-Eater cause as reactionary in purpose (the preservation of the South as it then existed), but revolutionary in means (the rejection of the existing political order).

When the conflicts in Kansas Territory known as Bleeding Kansas erupted in 1855–1856, Yancey spoke publicly in support of Jefferson Buford's efforts to raise 300 men to go to Kansas and fight for Southern interests. In 1856, Yancey was head of the platform committee for the state Democratic and Anti–Know Nothing Convention, and he succeeded in having the convention readopt the Alabama Platform. In June 1856, he participated in a rally condemning Charles Sumner while praising his assailant Preston Brooks, who nearly bludgeoned Sumner to death in the United States Senate chamber. In June 1857, Yancey spoke at a rally opposing Robert J. Walker's actions as territorial governor of Kansas. In July 1856, he spoke at the University of Alabama's graduation on "the distinctive characteristics of the Northern and Southern people of the Union." In January 1858, he participated in a rally supporting William Walker, the famous Nicaragua filibuster, calling the "Central American enterprise as the cause of the South."

Throughout the mid-1850s, he also lectured on behalf of the Mount Vernon Ladies' Association, an organization that eventually purchased Mount Vernon from John A. Washington in 1858 for its restoration. Yancey helped to raise $75,000 for this project.

Editor and fellow Fire-Eater James DeBow was a leader in establishing the Southern Commercial Conventions in the 1850s. At the 1857 meeting in Knoxville, DeBow had called for a reopening of the international slave trade. At the May 1858 convention in Montgomery, responding to a speech by Virginian Roger A. Pryor opposing the slave trade, Yancey, in an address that spanned several days, made the following points:

If slavery is right per se, if it is right to raise slaves for sale, does it not appear that it is right to import them?

Let us then wipe from our statute book this mark of Cain which our enemies have placed there.

We want negroes cheap, and we want a sufficiency of them, so as to supply the cotton demand of the whole world.

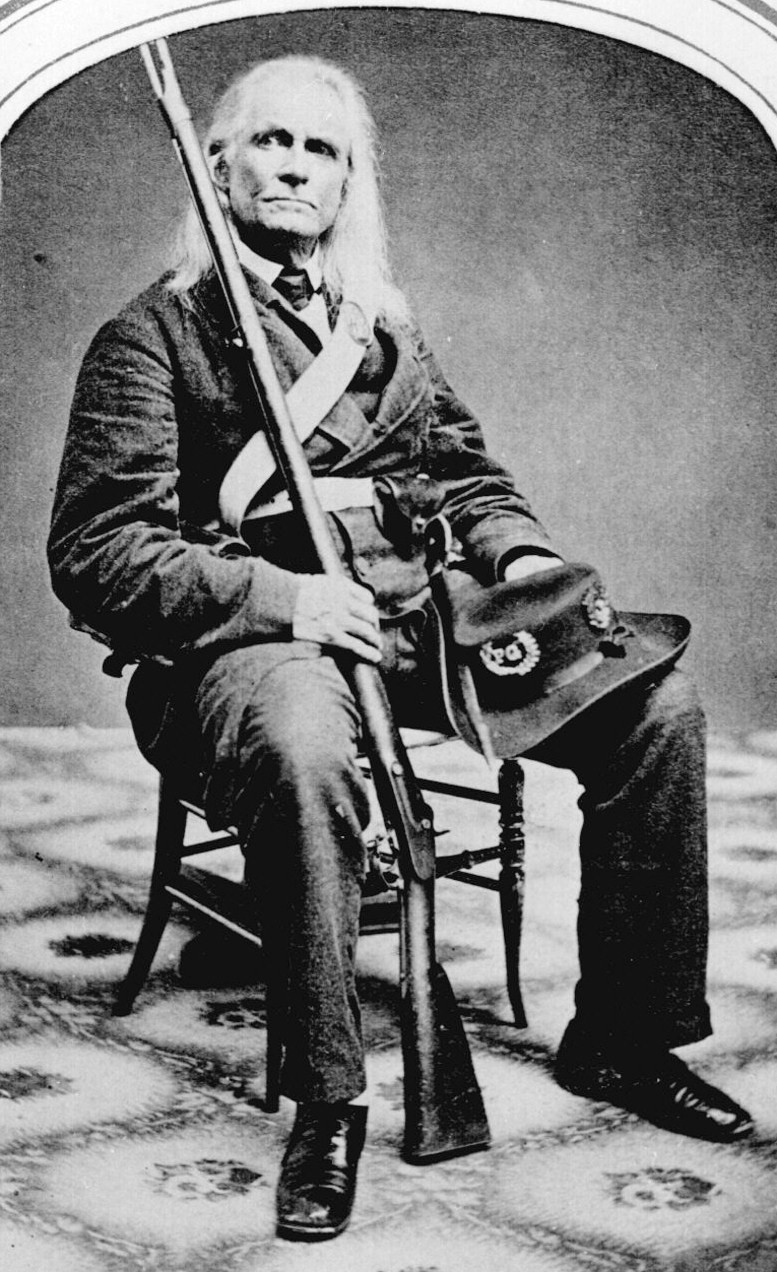
Edmund Ruffin proposed the creation of a League of United Southerners as an alternative to the current political parties, a plan that Yancey supported.

Yancey supported a plan originated by Edmund Ruffin for the creation of a League of United Southerners as an alternative to the national political parties. In a letter of June 16, 1858, to his friend James S. Slaughter that was publicly circulated (Horace Greeley referred to it as "The Scarlet Letter"), Yancey wrote the following:

No National Party can save us; no Sectional Party can do it. But if we could do as our fathers did, organize Committees of Safety all over the cotton states (and it is only in them that we can hope of any effective movement) we shall fire the Southern heart—instruct the Southern mind—give courage to each other, and at the proper moment, by one organized, concerted action, we can precipitate the cotton states into a revolution.

Yancey was ill for much of the remainder of 1858 and early 1859. For the 1859 Southern Commercial Convention in Vicksburg, which passed the resolution to repeal all state and federal regulations banning the slave trade, Yancey could only contribute editorials, although by July 1859 he was able to speak publicly in Columbia, South Carolina, in favor of repealing the restrictions. When the Alabama Democratic Party organized in the winter of 1859–1860 for the upcoming national convention, they chose Yancey to lead them on the basis of the Alabama Platform. Both Stephen A. Douglas and popular sovereignty were the immediate targets, but, by then, Yancey also recognized that secession would be necessary if a "Black Republican" were to gain the White House.

== Spreading the pro-slavery message ==
After twelve years' absence from the national conventions of the Democratic Party, Yancey attended the Charleston convention in April 1860. The Douglas faction refused to accept a platform modeled after Yancey's Alabama Platform of 1848 that was committed to protecting slavery in the territories. When the platform committee presented such a proposal to the convention, it was voted down on the floor 165–138. Yancey and the Alabama delegation left the hall and were followed by the delegates of Mississippi, Louisiana, South Carolina, Florida, and Texas and by two of the three delegates from Delaware. On the next day, the Georgia delegation and a majority of the Arkansas delegation withdrew. As Eric Walther states, "Through his years of preparation and despite some brief wavering, William L. Yancey had finally destroyed the Democratic Party."

Failing to nominate a candidate, the convention adjourned and reconvened in Baltimore on June 18, 1860. In a last gasp effort to obtain party unity, Douglas supporter George Nicholas Sanders made an unauthorized offer to Yancey to run as vice president. Yancey turned this down, and the entire Yancey delegation from Alabama was refused credentials in favor of a pro-Douglas slate headed by John Forsyth Jr. With the South Carolina delegation also being denied credentials, the Louisiana, Virginia, North Carolina, and Tennessee delegations left the convention. The Southern representatives reconvened in Baltimore on June 23 and adopted the Yancey platform from the Charleston convention and nominated John C. Breckinridge for president. In a speech before the convention, Yancey characterized the Douglas supporters as "ostrich-like—their heads were in the sand of squatter sovereignty, and they did not know their great, ugly, ragged abolition body was exposed". Yancey, who had already made thirty public addresses in 1860, delivered twenty more during the campaign. If he had not been a national figure before, he certainly was one now—a figure making it clear that secession would follow anything other than a Breckinridge election.

Yancey's speaking tour in favor of Breckinridge was not confined to the South. In Wilmington, Delaware, Yancey stated, "We stand upon the dark platform of southern slavery, and all we ask is to be allowed to keep it to ourselves. Let us do that, and we will not let the negro insult you by coming here and marrying your daughters."

On October 10, 1860, at Cooper Union Hall in New York, Yancey advised Northerners interested in preserving the Union to "enlarge your jails and penitentiaries, re-enforce and strengthen your police force, and keep the irrepressible conflict fellows from stealing our negroes..." Yancey cited Southern fears that, with abolitionists in power, "emissaries will percolate between master [and] slave as water between the crevices of rocks underground. They will be found everywhere, with strychnine to put in our wells." He further warned the crowd that Republican agitation would make Southern whites "the enemies of that race until we drench our fields with the blood of the unfortunate people."

At Faneuil Hall in Boston, Yancey defended the practices of slavery:

You are allowed to whip your children; we are allowed to whip our negroes. There is no cruelty in the practice. ... Our negroes are but children. ... The negro that will not work is made to work. Society tolerates no drones.

From Boston, Yancey's tour included stops in Albany, Syracuse, Louisville, Nashville, and New Orleans, finally returning to Montgomery on November 5. When news of Lincoln's election reached the city, Yancey rhetorically asked a public assemblage protesting the results, "Shall we remain [in the Union] and all be slaves? Shall we wait to bear our share of the common dishonor? God forbid!"

== Secession ==
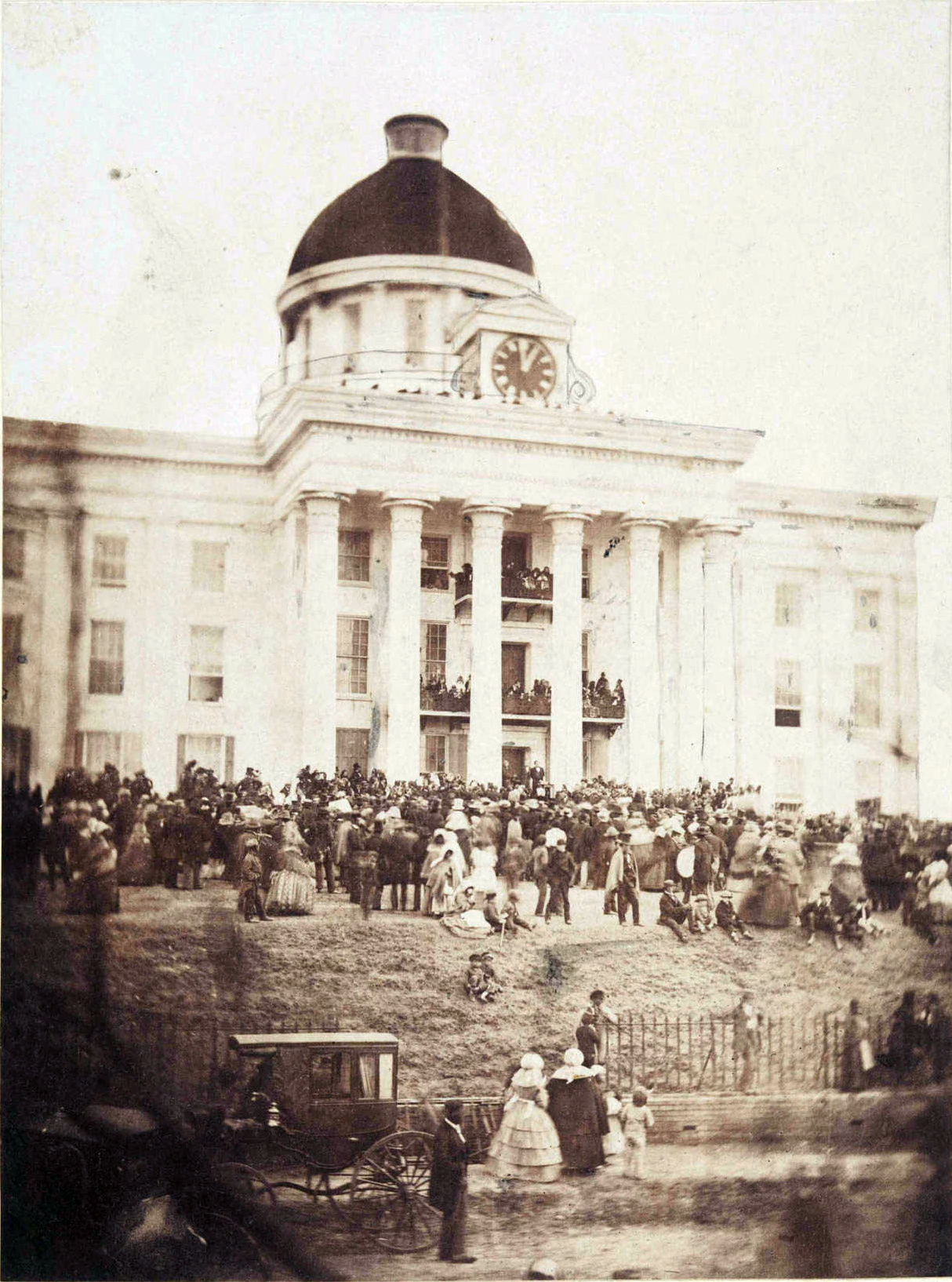
Jefferson Davis being sworn in as President of the Confederate States of America at the Capitol in Montgomery, Alabama, in 1861. Yancey had made the formal welcome address to Davis, stating that "The man and the hour have met." Later, Yancey would criticize many of Davis's actions.

On February 24, 1860, the Alabama legislature passed a joint resolution requiring the governor to call for the election of delegates to a state convention if a Republican were elected president. After first waiting for the official electoral votes to be counted, Governor Andrew Moore called for the election of delegates to take place on December 24, with the convention to meet on January 7, 1861. When the convention convened, Yancey was the guiding spirit. The delegates were split between those insisting on immediate secession versus those who would secede only in cooperation with other Southern states. A frustrated Yancey lashed out at those cooperationists:

The misguided, deluded, wicked men in our midst, if any such there be, who shall oppose it [secession], will be in alignment with the abolition power of the Federal government, and as our safety demands, must be looked upon and dealt with as public enemies.

Eventually, the ordinance of secession was passed over cooperationists' objections by a vote of 61–39.

When the newly established Confederate States of America met later that month in Montgomery to establish their formal union, Yancey was not a delegate, but he delivered the address of welcome to Jefferson Davis, selected as provisional President, on his arrival at Montgomery. While many of the Fire-Eaters were opposed to the selection of a relative moderate like Davis, Yancey accepted him as a good choice. In his speech, Yancey indicated that, in the selection of Davis, "the man and the hour have met." We now hope that prosperity, honor, and victory await his administration." Many historians agree with Emory Thomas, who wrote, "When Yancey and Davis met in Montgomery, the helm of the revolution changed hands. Yancey and the radicals had stirred the waters; Davis and the moderates would sail the ship."

== At war ==
=== Diplomat ===
Confederate President Jefferson Davis and Yancey met on February 18, 1861, as Davis was starting to put together the executive branch of the government. Yancey turned down a cabinet position, but indicated he would be interested in a diplomatic post. Don Doyle argues that Davis displayed "tone deafness" in appointing Yancey, who was "ignorant of the world" and himself realized that he was "wholly unsuited by experience and personality for diplomacy." However, Davis feared that Yancey would be a political opponent, and wanted him out of the country.

On March 16, Yancey was formally appointed as the head of the diplomatic mission to England and France. Ambrose Dudley Mann and Pierre Adolphe Rost were also part of the mission; only Mann had any diplomatic experience. The delegation assembled in London at the end of April. Confederate Secretary of State Toombs's official instructions to Yancey were to convince Europe of the righteousness and legality of Southern secession, the viability of the militarily strong Confederacy, the value of cotton and virtually duty-free trade, and the South's willingness to observe all treaty agreements in effect between Britain and the United States except for the portion of the Webster-Ashburton Treaty requiring aid in combating the African slave trade. Above all, Yancey was to strive for diplomatic recognition.

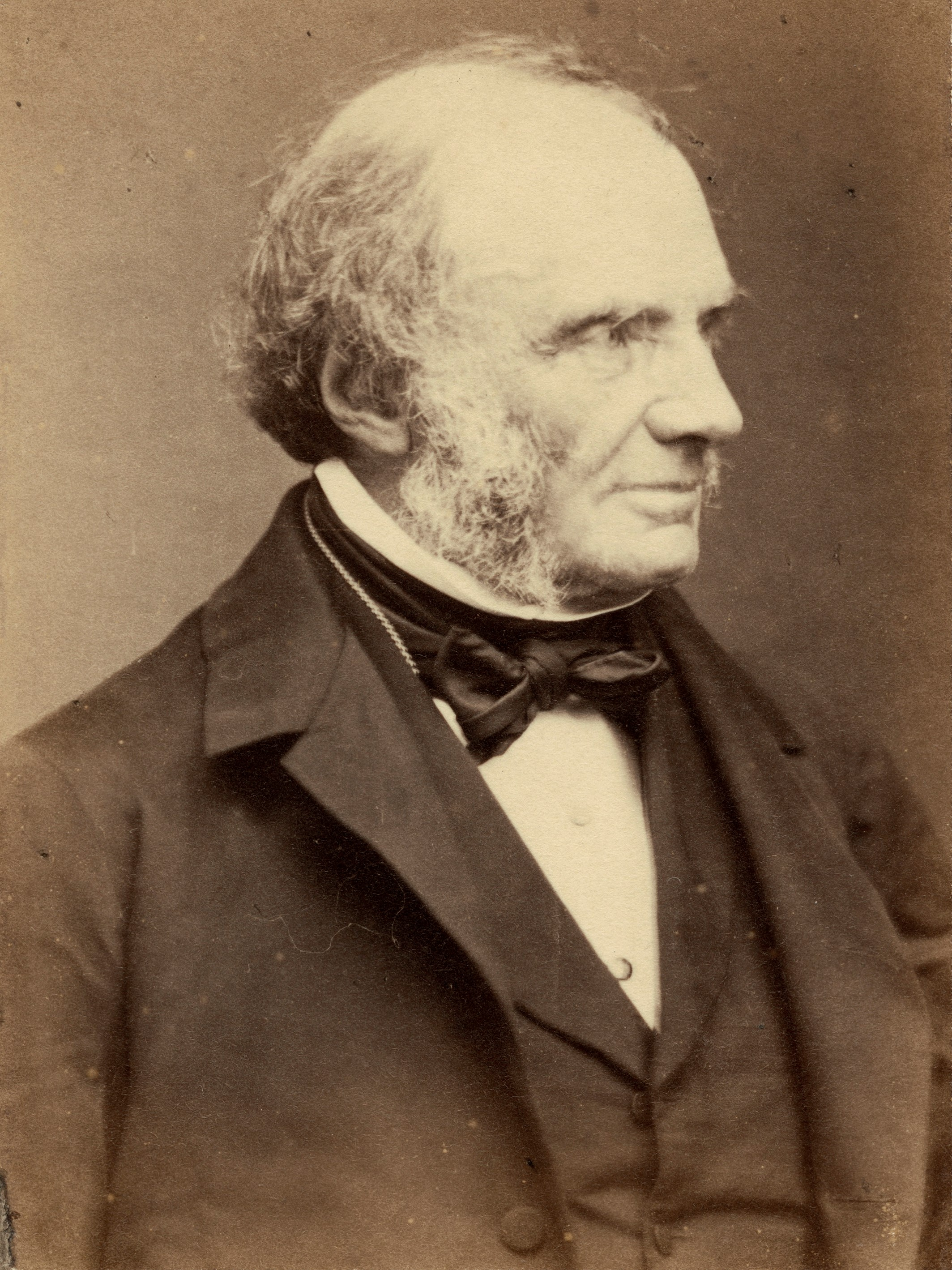
British Foreign Secretary Lord Russell rejected efforts by the Confederacy to secure diplomatic recognition by Great Britain. He would only agree to meet informally with Yancey and refused to meet with him at all during the critical Trent Affair.

Hubbard argues that President Davis could not have selected "three less qualified Southern leaders". In contrast to Walther's favorable characterizations of Yancey's conduct, Hubbard stated that Yancey's conduct in England was "consistently impulsive, arrogant, [and] unreasonably demanding". Arriving in Britain just a few days ahead of the news about the attack on Fort Sumter, Yancey and his delegation met informally with British foreign secretary Lord John Russell on May 3 and 9. Yancey emphasized the points from his instructions and denied, upon being questioned by Russell, that there was any intent to reopen the slave trade. Russell was non-committal, and on May 12, Queen Victoria announced British neutrality combined with recognition that a state of belligerency existed.

After news arrived of the Confederate victory at Bull Run, Yancey attempted to arrange another meeting with Russell, but he was forced to present his arguments in writing. Doyle argues that Yancey blundered badly by extolling the benefits of slavery to the world in general and Britain in particular. In an August 24 response directed to the representatives "of the so-styled Confederate States of America", Russell merely reiterated the previous determination to remain neutral. Critics maintain that the Yancey mission failed to adequately exploit openings presented by U.S. Secretary of State William Seward's antagonist attitude towards Great Britain or to address British concerns concerning the effect of the war on Great Britain. In late August, with little else to do, Yancey submitted his resignation, but, due to the events of the Trent Affair, Yancey did not leave until his replacements, James M. Mason and John Slidell (selected by President Davis in July before he was aware of Yancey's intent), arrived in January 1862. Yancey did make one further attempt to meet with Russell in the wake of the Trent affair, but Russell replied to the delegation that "we must decline to enter into any official communication with them."

While Yancey was originally optimistic about his mission, his observations in conversations and in the British papers forced him to conclude that the slavery issue was the primary obstacle to formal diplomatic recognition. He told his brother, "Anti-slavery sentiment is universal. Uncle Tom's Cabin has been read and believed....I ought never to have come here. This kind of thing does not suit me. I do not understand these people or their ways well enough."

=== Confederate Senate ===
While still in England, Yancey was elected to the Confederate Senate. His return home, because of the Union blockade, found him landing at the Sabine Pass near the Texas and Louisiana border. On his way to Richmond, he stopped in New Orleans, where he made a public speech lamenting the fact that Europe looked down on the Confederacy over the issue of slavery, stating, "We cannot look for any sympathy or help from abroad. We must rely on ourselves alone."

From March 28, 1862, until May 1, 1863, Yancey served in three sessions of the Confederate Congress. While there, he reluctantly supported the Confederate Conscription Act of April 16, 1862, but was instrumental in allowing many state exemptions to the draft as well as the unpopular exemption for one overseer for every twenty slaves, an exemption that applied to about 30,000 men. He unsuccessfully argued against the excessive use of secret, unrecorded sessions of Congress and generally pursued a states' rights position in regard to the exercise of national war powers in general and impressment of supplies and slaves by the federal Confederate government in particular. On military matters, Yancey wanted details provided to Congress on reports of execution without trials of Confederate soldiers by General Braxton Bragg, questioned the reasons Virginia had 29 brigadier generals while Alabama only had four; authored a resolution condemning drunkenness within the army; and joined in demands that Davis account for complaints on the military administration of the Trans-Mississippi District.

Yancey gradually ran afoul of President Davis on matters of policy, although he was not one of Davis's most extreme critics. Their differences accelerated in a series of letters exchanged after May 1863, and no final resolution was reached. In Congress, Yancey and Benjamin Hill of Georgia, who had previously clashed in 1856, had their differences over a bill intended to create the Confederate Supreme Court erupt into physical violence. Hill hit Yancey in the head with a glass inkstand, knocking Yancey over a desk and onto the floor of the Senate. The physical attack on Yancey by Hill within the Confederate Congress was kept secret for months, and in the ensuing investigation it was Yancey, not Hill, who was censured.

Yancey returned to Alabama in May 1863, before Congress had adjourned. By the end of June, Yancey was extremely ill from his injuries received during the attack by Hill in the Confederate Congress, but he still continued his correspondence with President Davis and others. Finally, on July 27, 1863, at age 48, Yancey died of kidney disease. Yancey's funeral on July 29, 1863, brought the city of Montgomery to a standstill, and he was buried at Oakwood Cemetery on Goat Hill near the original Confederate Capitol.

== Memorials ==
The William Lowndes Yancey Law Office in Montgomery, Alabama, was designated a National Historic Landmark of the United States in 1973. Due to unauthorized interior renovations, it was later de-designated, but it remains listed on the National Register of Historic Places.

U.S. House of Representatives
Preceded by Dixon Lewis	Member of the U.S. House of Representatives from Alabama's 3rd congressional district 1844–1846	Succeeded by James Cottrell
Confederate States Senate
New constituency	Confederate States Senator (Class 3) from Alabama; 1862–1863; Served alongside: Clement Clay	Succeeded by Robert Jemison
