= Robert Jemison Jr. =

American politician (1802–1871)

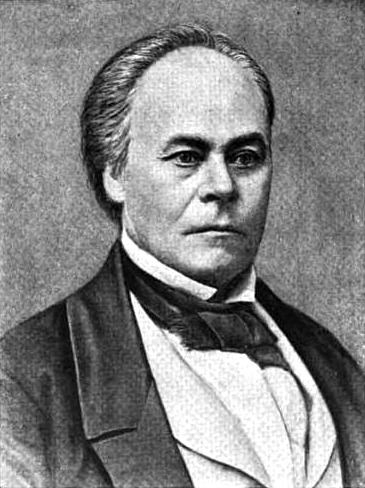

Confederate States Senator from Alabama
- In office December 28, 1863 – May 10, 1865
- Preceded by: William Yancey
- Succeeded by: Constituency abolished

Personal details
- Born: September 17, 1802 Lincoln County, Georgia, U.S.
- Died: October 16, 1871 (aged 69) Tuscaloosa, Alabama, U.S.
- Party: Union Whig, Democratic

Robert Jemison Jr. (September 17, 1802 – October 16, 1871) was an American politician, entrepreneur and slave owner who served as a Confederate States Senator from Alabama from 1863 to 1865. He also served in the two houses of the Alabama Legislature from 1837 until 1863.

== Early years ==
Jemison was born in Lincoln County, Georgia, near Augusta, Georgia, to William and Sarah (Mims) Jemison. He was educated there at Mount Zion Academy, where he was a classmate of Dixon Hall Lewis, and attended the University of Georgia. His father, William Jemison, was a slaveholder and landowner of at least four large-scale properties. Robert Jemison Jr. used the Jr. behind his name to distinguish himself from his grandfather, also named Robert. In 1826, Jemison moved with his father's family to Pickens County, Alabama, where he was a planter until 1836, when he moved to Tuscaloosa, Alabama.

== Career ==
Jemison served in the Alabama state legislature, initially in the Senate and then in the House, from 1840 to 1851. He returned to the Senate from 1851 to 1863. In 1861, he was a Delegate to the convention and voted against the Ordinance of Secession. He was elected unanimously to be President of the Alabama Senate in 1863; soon after, he was elected to the Confederate States Senate, replacing William Lowndes Yancey, who had died of a kidney ailment.

Jemison owned multiple businesses. A primary source of capital was his plantations. His papers show that he owned 120 slaves in 1851, including 44 children under the age of 10. He owned six plantations in western Alabama, totaling 10,000 acres (4,000 ha). In 1858, he attempted to sell the plantations, 70 slaves and other land in Tuscaloosa, including another residence, a livery stable and the Indian Queen Hotel. Jemison's other ventures included a stagecoach line, toll roads, toll bridges, grist mills, sawmills, turnpikes, stables, a hotel, and plank roads. His largest enterprise was a 4,000-acre (1,600 ha) Cherokee Place plantation in what is now Northport, Alabama, where he lived before building the Jemison-Van de Graaff Mansion in Tuscaloosa.

Jemison advocated for the creation of a state-owned mental hospital which eventually became Bryce Hospital, and hired the same Philadelphia architectural firm to design both his private Tuscaloosa mansion and the hospital. After the Civil War, Jemison's wealth was significantly diminished, and eventually he lost his family mansion due to debt.

One of his businesses was the Tuscaloosa Bridge Company. It built two of the first covered bridges across the Black Warrior River. Jemison hired Horace King, a skilled multiracial enslaved person from Russell County to build bridges in eastern Mississippi. King became one of the most respected bridge designers and builders in the Deep South. In 1846, Jemison, along with King's owner, John Godwin, obtained his freedom through an act of the Alabama Legislature, which exempted King from the manumission laws. King built the last covered bridge at Tuscaloosa and Northport over the Black Warrior in 1872 just a few months after Jemison's death on October 16, 1871. Jemison made an arrangement with Tuscaloosa County for King to build the bridge and this bridge was the first of many that the county would build.

== Family ==
Jemison was married to Priscilla (Cherokee) Jemison and had one daughter, Cherokee Mims Jemison.

Confederate States Senate
Preceded by William Yancey	Confederate States Senator (Class 3) from Alabama; 1863–1865; Served alongside: Clement Clay, Richard Walker	Constituency abolished
