= William Lowndes Yancey Law Office =

Building in Montgomery, Alabama

- U.S. National Register of Historic Places
- Former U.S. National Historic Landmark
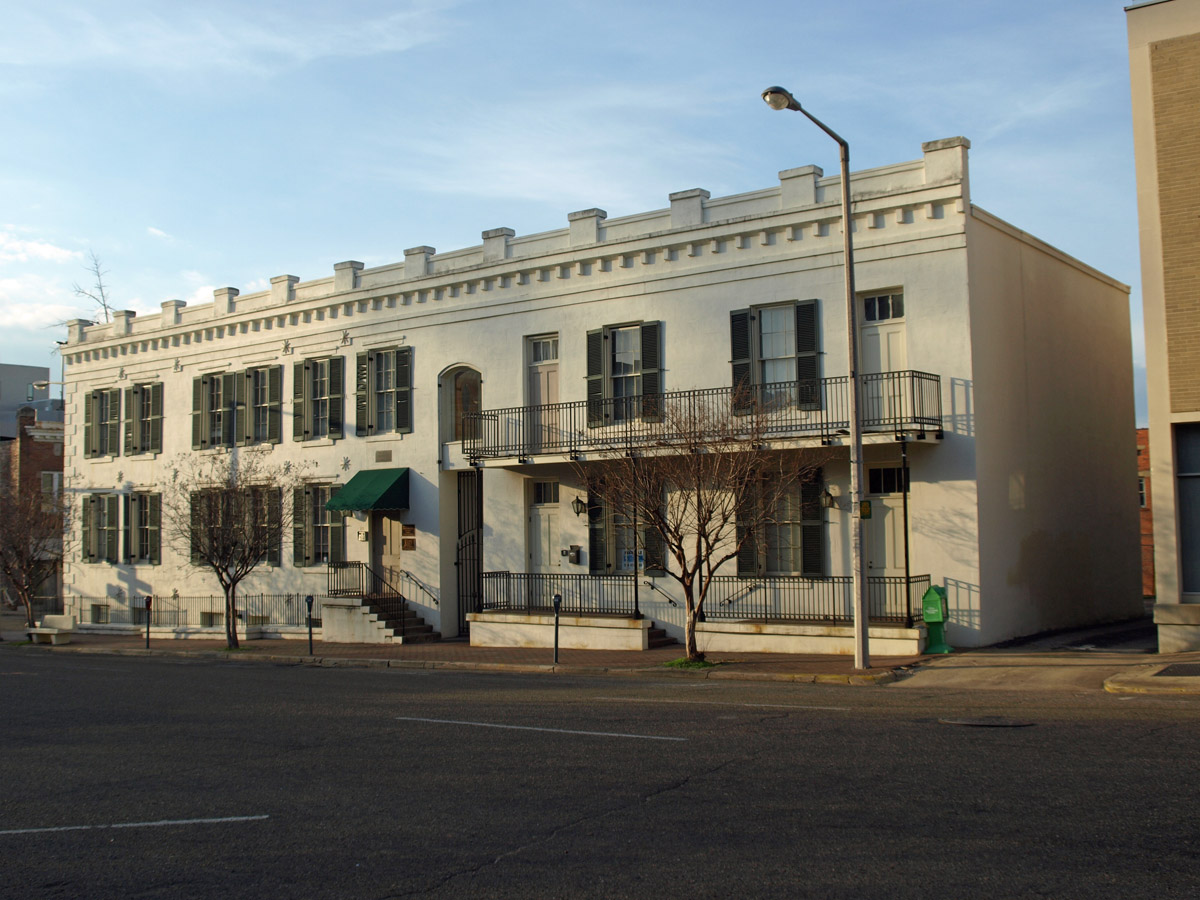
- William Lowndes Yancey Law Office in 2009

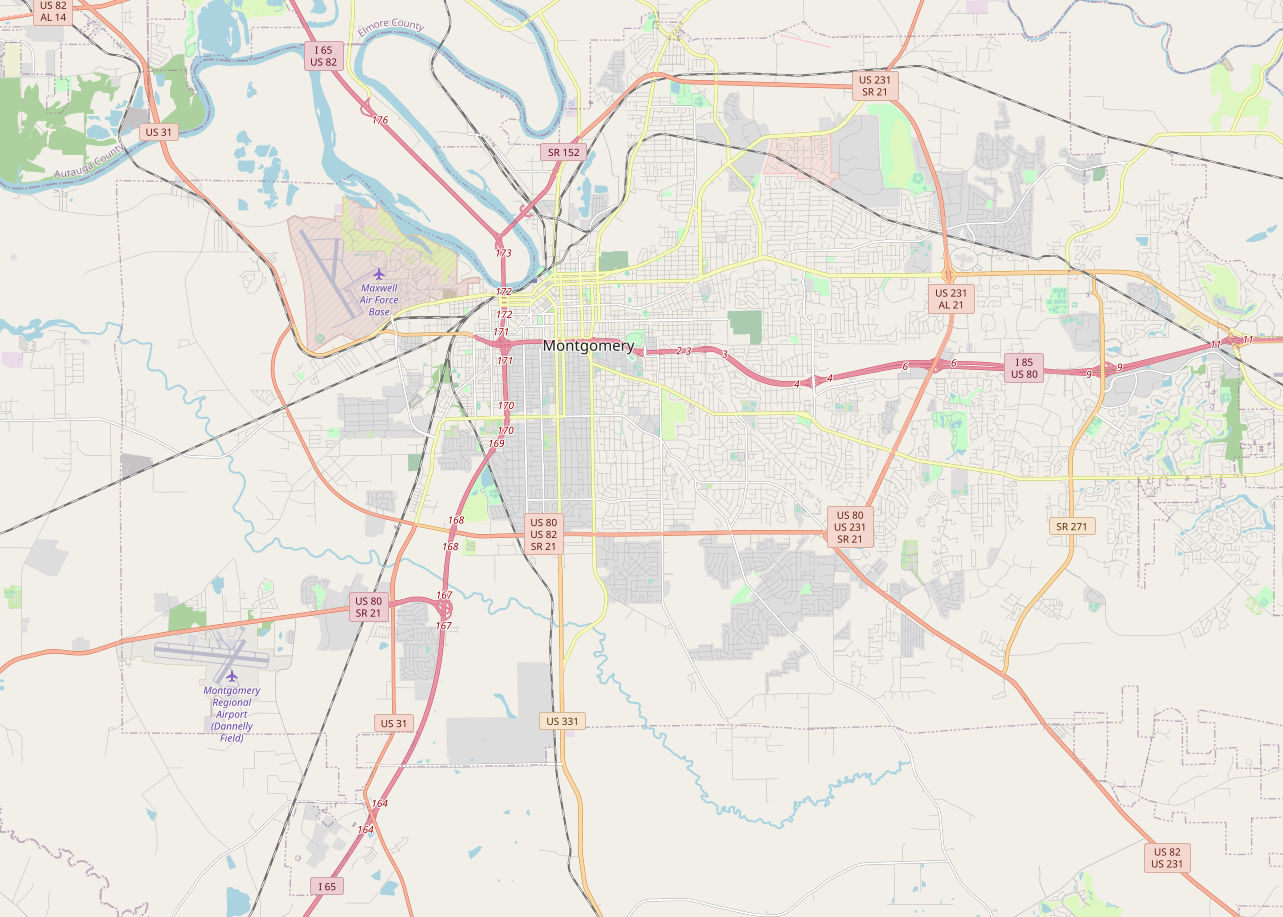
- Location within Montgomery, Alabama Location within Alabama Location within the United States
- Location: Montgomery, Alabama
- Coordinates: 32°22′35″N 86°18′26″W
- Built: 1846
- NRHP reference No.: 73000371

Significant dates
- Added to NRHP: November 7, 1973
- Designated NHL: November 7, 1973
- Delisted NHL: 1986

The William Lowndes Yancey Law Office is located at the corner of Washington and Perry Streets in Montgomery, Alabama. It served as the law offices for one of the South's leading advocates of secession from the United States, William Lowndes Yancey, from 1846 until his death in 1863. He joined with John A. Elmore to form a legal firm after his resignation from Congress on September 1, 1846. Yancey wrote Alabama's Ordinance of Secession after the election of Abraham Lincoln and subsequently served as the Confederacy's Commissioner to England and France.

The building was designated historic due to its being the Post Office of the Confederate States of America as shown by the plaque outside the building, not due to Yancey's use as an office.

It was listed on the National Register of Historic Places in 1973 and also declared a National Historic Landmark on November 7, 1973. The building's interior included the historic floor plan and other decorative details when it was declared a landmark. The late 1970s brought redevelopment of the site and the building was altered, this caused substantial losses to enough of the historic elements that the landmark designation was withdrawn on March 5, 1986. The building remains on the National Register of Historic Places, however.

As a lawyer, populist legislator, firebrand orator, and party leader, William Lowndes Yancey was an important figure in sectional politics in the leadup to the Civil War. As one of the leading Southern Fire-Eaters, he gained national influence as an aggressive advocate of Slavery and States' Rights and exacerbated sectional differences that led to the secession of the Southern states from the Union. He had his law office in this building from 1846 until his death in 1863. Through successive modernizations and restorations in the 1970s and 1980s, the building lost much of the historic integrity for which it was originally designated a landmark, leading to the withdrawal of its designation. It was, however, retained on the National Register of Historic Places.

== See also ==
- List of National Historic Landmarks in Alabama
