= Jemison–Van de Graaff Mansion =

Historic house in Alabama, United States

- Jemison–Van de Graaff House
- U.S. National Register of Historic Places
- Alabama Register of Landmarks and Heritage
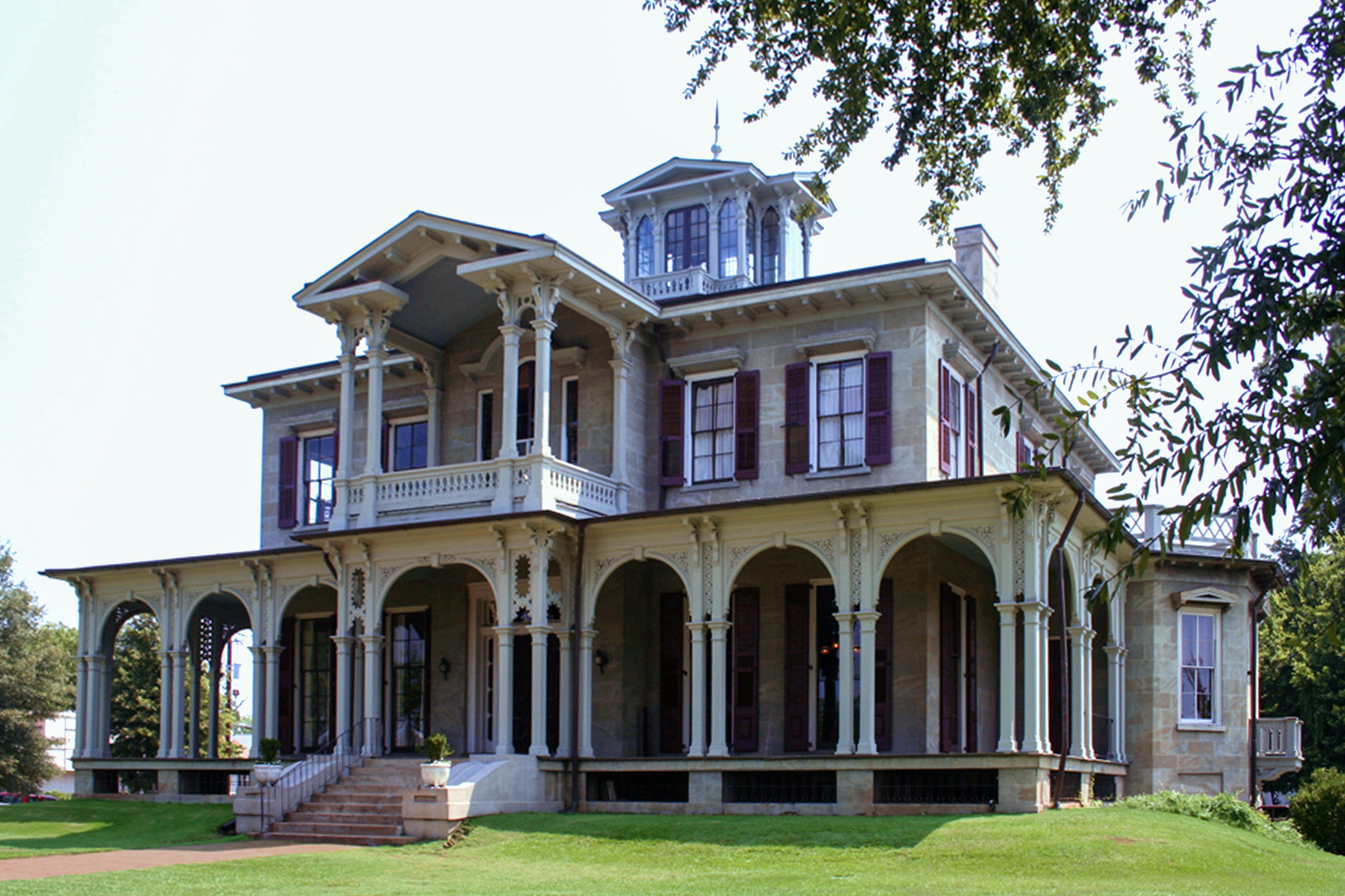
- Front facade in 2010

- Location within Alabama Location within the United States
- Interactive map showing the location for Jemison-Van de Graff House
- Location: 1305 Greensboro Ave., Tuscaloosa, Alabama
- Coordinates: 33°12′7″N 87°33′53″W
- Area: less than one acre
- Built: 1859-1862
- Architect: John Stewart
- Architectural style: Italianate
- NRHP reference No.: 72000185

Significant dates
- Added to NRHP: April 19, 1972
- Designated ARLH: July 31, 1975

The Jemison–Van de Graaff Mansion, also known as the Jemison–Van de Graaf–Burchfield House, is a historic house in Tuscaloosa, Alabama, United States. The structure remained a private residence until 1955, when it served first as a library, then publishing house offices, and lastly as a historic house museum. The mansion was added to the National Register of Historic Places on April 19, 1972, due to its architectural significance.

== History ==
The 26-room Italianate mansion was designed by architect Samuel Sloan for Robert Jemison, Jr., a local planter, politician, and businessman. John Stewart supervised construction, and had been a partner with Sloan. Construction began in 1859, as the nearby Alabama State Hospital for the Insane, designed by Sloan, neared completion. Stewart was in Tuscaloosa supervising the construction of the hospital. Jemison had been a significant political force in getting the Alabama Legislature to locate the proposed Alabama Insane Hospital in Tuscaloosa, since the state capital had been relocated to Montgomery in 1846.

Construction on the mansion continued into the early years of the American Civil War, being primarily completed in 1862. Although some items were never completed as planned due to the war and the resulting Union blockade of the South, the house made use of the latest technology. This included an elaborate plumbing system which featured running water, flush toilets, a hot water boiler, and a copper bathtub. This was some of the earliest modern plumbing in the state. The property also had its own coal gas plant, which provided the mansion with gas lighting and fueled a kitchen stove.

Jemison died at the mansion on October 16, 1871. The property remained in the hands of his descendants into the 20th century. Robert Jemison's best-known descendant, Robert Jemison Van de Graaff, was born there in 1901. The house was sold to J.P. and Nell Burchfield in 1945, who would later complete the first major restoration. Following their ownership it was converted to use as Tuscaloosa's Friedman Public Library from 1955 until 1979. Once the library was relocated it was used by two national publications, first Horizon and then Antique Monthly. Finally, it was acquired by the Jemison–Van de Graaff Mansion Foundation in 1991. Since that time it has been fully restored and is now operated as a historic house museum and event location.
