= James L. F. Cottrell =

American politician

Member of the U.S. House of Representatives from Alabama's 3rd district
- In office December 7, 1846 – March 3, 1847
- Preceded by: William L. Yancey
- Succeeded by: Sampson W. Harris

Member of the Alabama House of Representatives
- In office 1834; 1836; 1837

Member of the Florida Senate
- In office 1865-1885

Personal details
- Born: James La Fayette Cottrell; August 25, 1808 King William, Virginia
- Died: September 7, 1885 (aged 77) Cedar Keys, Florida
- Party: Democratic

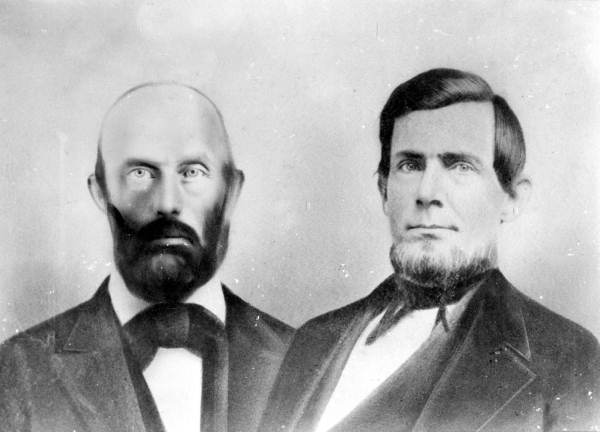
James La Fayette Cottrell and his brother-in-law James McQueen

James La Fayette Cottrell (August 25, 1808 – September 7, 1885) was a U.S. representative from Alabama.

Born near King William, Virginia, Cottrell completed preparatory studies. He studied law. He was admitted to the bar in 1830 and commenced practice in Hayneville, Alabama. He served as member of the Alabama House of Representatives in 1834, 1836, and 1837. He served in the State senate 1838-1841, and was president of that body in 1840.

Cottrell was elected as a Democrat to the Twenty-ninth Congress to fill the vacancy caused by the resignation of William L. Yancey and served from December 7, 1846, to March 3, 1847. He moved to Florida in 1854. He served in the Florida Senate in 1865–1885. He was appointed collector of customs at Cedar Keys, Florida, and served until his death in that city September 7, 1885. He was interred in Old Town Cemetery, Old Town, Florida.

U.S. House of Representatives
Preceded by William L. Yancey	Member of the U.S. House of Representatives from Alabama's 3rd congressional district December 7, 1846 - March 3, 1847	Succeeded by Sampson W. Harris
