= Pleasant Point (Scotland, Virginia) =

Historic house in Virginia, United States

- U.S. National Register of Historic Places
- Virginia Landmarks Register
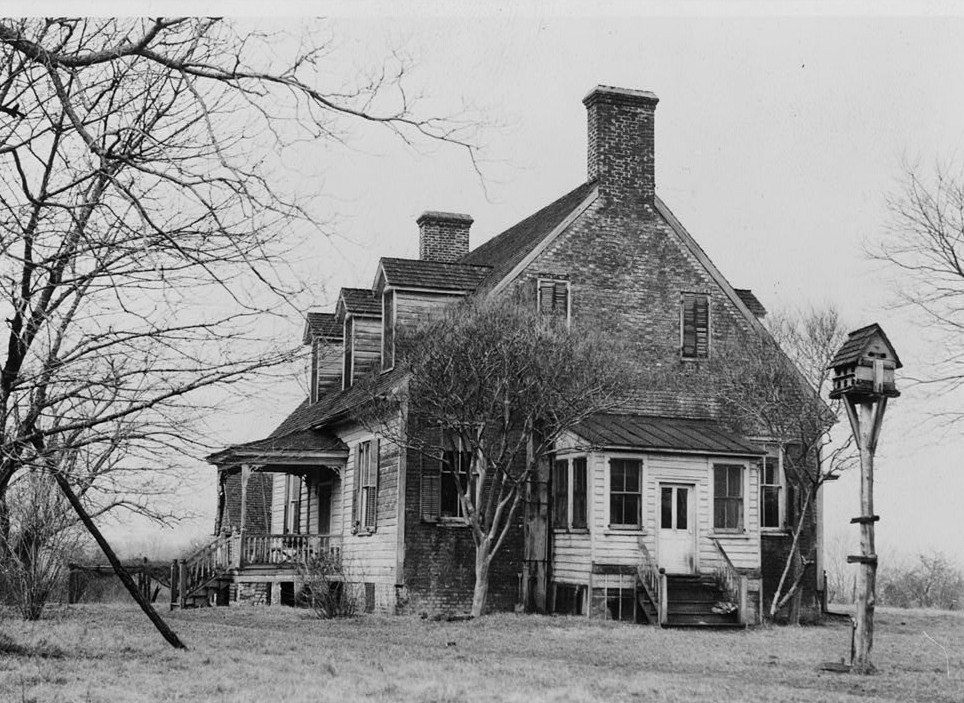
- Pleasant Point, HABS Photo

- Location within Virginia Location within the United States
- Location: 1 mi. S of Scotland on VA 637, near Scotland, Virginia
- Coordinates: 37°10′25″N 76°46′32″W
- Area: 12 acres (4.9 ha)
- Built: c. 1724
- NRHP reference No.: 76002122
- VLR No.: 090-0020

Significant dates
- Added to NRHP: July 16, 1976
- Designated VLR: September 17, 1975

Pleasant Point, also known as Crouches Creek Plantation, is a historic home located near Scotland, Surry County, Virginia. It was built about 1724, and is a 1 1/2-story, double pile frame dwelling with brick ends. It has a gable roof and originally had a hall-parlor plan, later modified to a central-hall plan. The interior woodwork was largely replaced in the 1950s, although it retains some original doors, framing and original bowfat in the dining room. Also on the property are a contributing dairy, smokehouse, laundry and a four-step terrace leading down to the bluffs overlooking the James River.

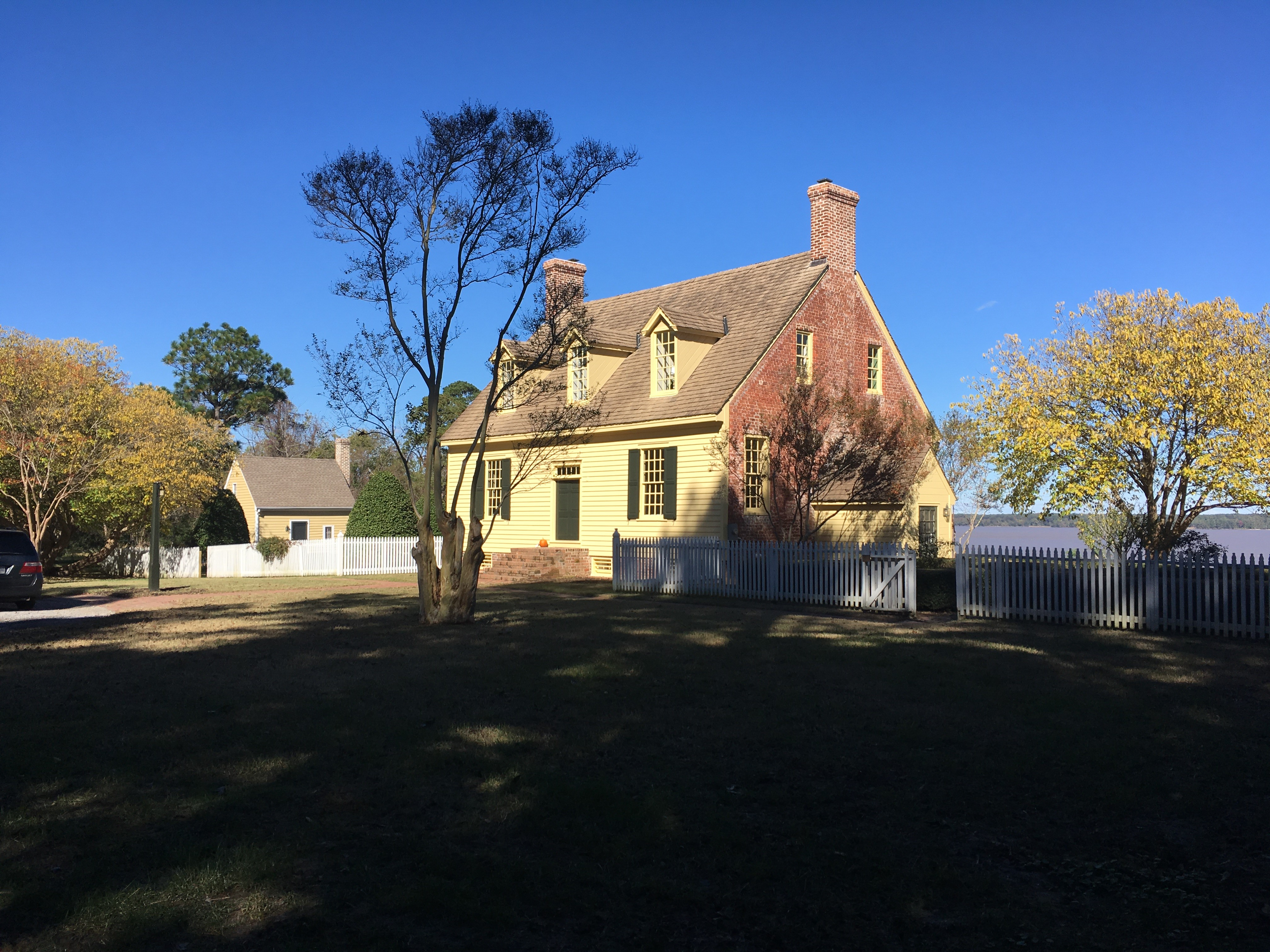
Pleasant Point is a plantation on the south side of the James River in Surry, Virginia

It was listed on the National Register of Historic Places in 1976.
