= Evergreen (Hopewell, Virginia) =

Historic house in Virginia, United States

- U.S. National Register of Historic Places
- Virginia Landmarks Register
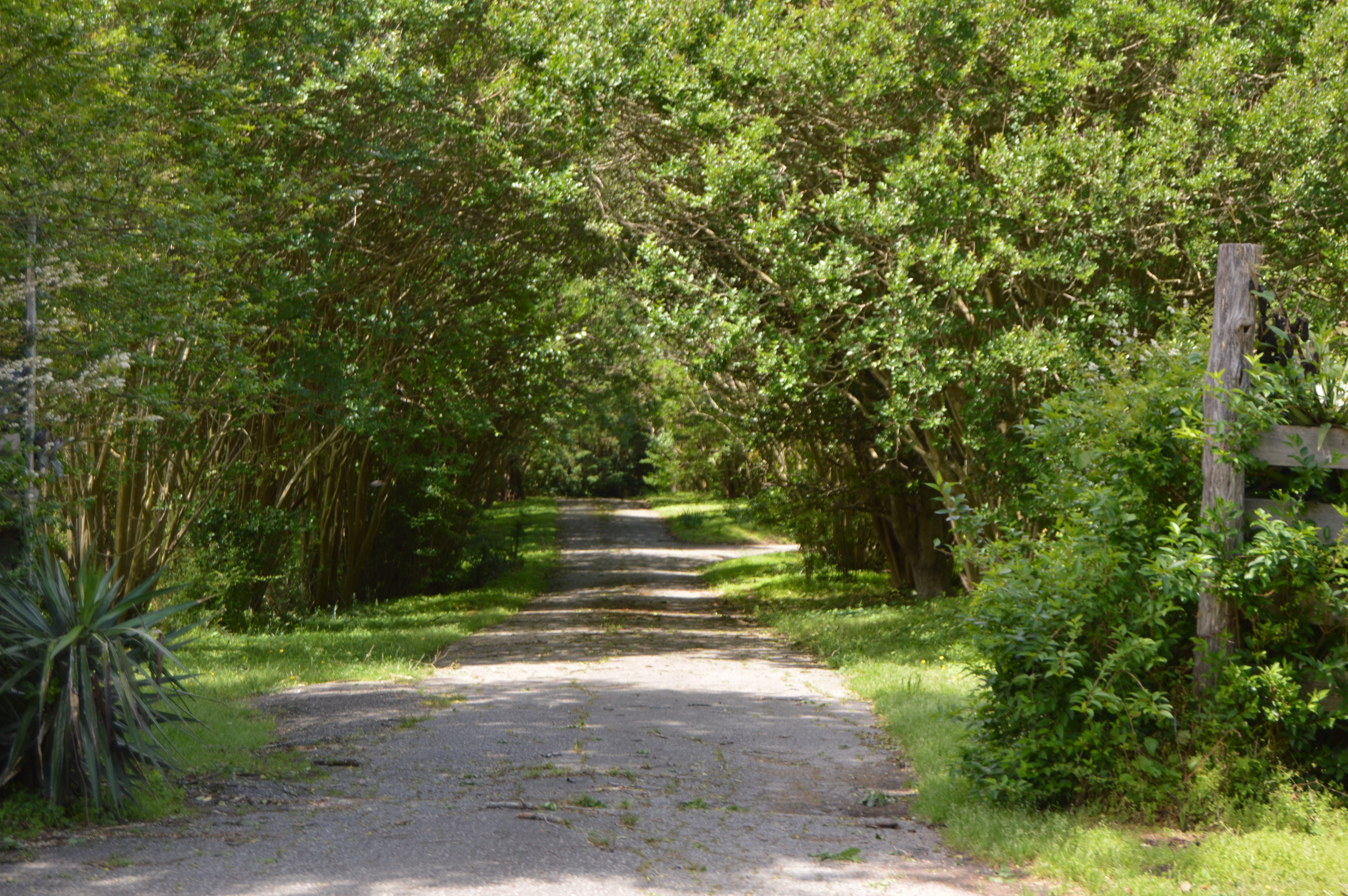
- Entrance to the property

- Location within Virginia Location within the United States
- Location: Ruffin Road, east of Hopewell, Virginia
- Coordinates: 37°17′26″N 77°14′27″W
- Area: 4 acres (1.6 ha)
- Built: 1807
- Architectural style: Early Republic, Federal, Late Georgian
- NRHP reference No.: 79003070
- VLR No.: 074-0005

Significant dates
- Added to NRHP: July 24, 1979
- Designated VLR: May 15, 1979

Evergreen, one of the James River Plantations, is a historic plantation house located just east of Hopewell in Prince George County, Virginia. It was built about 1807 by planter, George Ruffin, and is a two-story, five-bay, Late Georgian / Federal style stuccoed brick dwelling. It sits on a high basement and has a hipped roof. The front facade features a one-story pedimented Doric order portico set on a brick podium. George Ruffin's son, ardent secessionist Edmund Ruffin, who is credited with firing one of the first shots at Fort Sumter at the start of the Civil War was born at Evergreen in 1794. The house was extensively renovated in the late-1930s, after prior use as a barn and stable.

Evergreen was listed on the National Register of Historic Places in 2002.
