= Wilton (Wilton, Virginia) =

Historic house in Virginia, United States

- U.S. National Register of Historic Places
- Virginia Landmarks Register
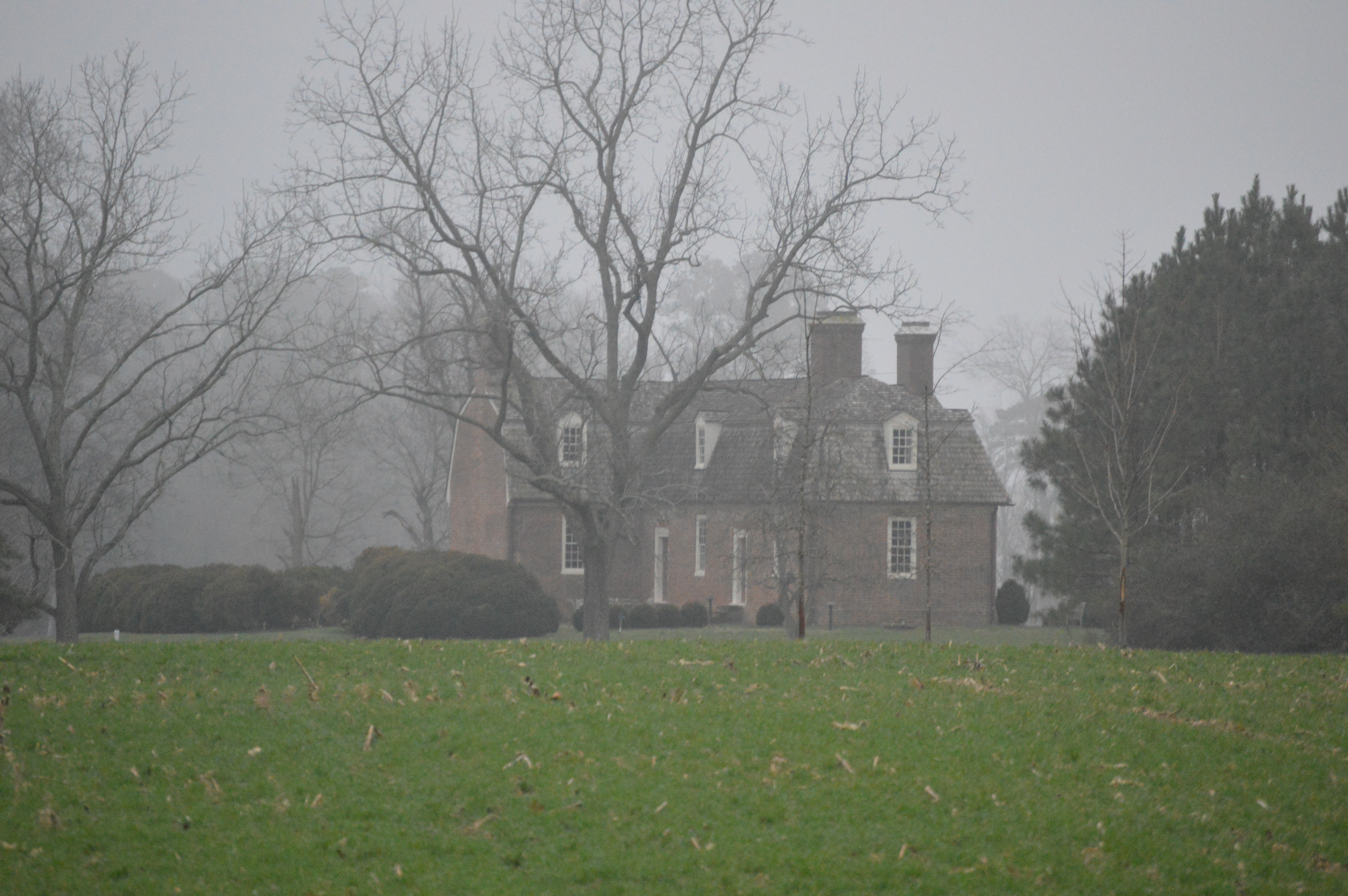
- Roadside view from the north

- Location within Virginia Location within the United States
- Location: South of Wilton on VA 3, near Wilton, Virginia
- Coordinates: 37°31′47″N 76°25′24″W
- Area: 8 acres (3.2 ha)
- Built: 1763
- Architectural style: Colonial, Late Colonial
- NRHP reference No.: 79003055
- VLR No.: 059-0010

Significant dates
- Added to NRHP: February 28, 1979
- Designated VLR: October 17, 1978

Wilton is a historic plantation house located near Wilton, Middlesex County, Virginia. It was constructed in 1763, and is a 1 1/2-story, T-shaped brick dwelling, with a five-bay front section and four-bay rear ell. The front portion of the house is covered with a gambrel roof and the rear with a hip-on-hip roof.

It was listed on the National Register of Historic Places in 1979.
