= Edmund Ruffin Plantation =

Historic house in Virginia, United States

- Marlbourne
- U.S. National Register of Historic Places
- U.S. National Historic Landmark District
- Virginia Landmarks Register
- Location within Virginia Location within the United States
- Location: U.S. Route 360, Hanover County, Virginia
- Nearest city: Richmond, Virginia
- Coordinates: 37°39′15.13″N 77°13′20.92″W
- Built: 1843
- NRHP reference No.: 66000837
- VLR No.: 042-0020

Significant dates
- Added to NRHP: October 15, 1966
- Designated NHLD: July 19, 1964
- Designated VLR: September 9, 1969

The Edmund Ruffin Plantation, also known as Marlbourne, is a U.S. National Historic Landmark in Hanover County, Virginia, 11 miles (18 km) northeast of Richmond.

== History ==
Built in 1840, the plantation was purchased in 1843 by Edmund Ruffin, a Virginia planter and a pioneer in agricultural improvements; he also published an agricultural journal in the 1840s named the Farmer's Register. One of a group of intellectuals they called "the sacred circle", he worked to reform agriculture in the South, promoting crop rotation and soil conservation; he is considered to have been "the father of soil science" in the United States. Ruffin experimented with agricultural methods and mixed marl, defined as "a friable earthy deposit consisting of clay and calcium carbonate, used esp. as a fertilizer for soils deficient in lime" to add to soils.

He and his friends: James Henry Hammond, Nathaniel Beverley Tucker, George Frederick Holmes, and William Gilmore Simms, were pro-slavery and promoted a moral reform of the South. They published numerous articles in literary and short-lived magazines, promoting a stewardship role for masters to improve conditions under slavery.

Later Ruffin gained more attention as one of a number of secessionist fire-eaters; he traveled to South Carolina and is credited with firing one of the first shots at Fort Sumter in 1861. Despondent after General Lee's surrender in 1865, he left a note proclaiming his "unmitigated hatred to Yankee rule—to all political, social and business connections with Yankees, & to the perfidious, malignant, & vile Yankee race" and committed suicide at Redmoor in Amelia County. He is buried on the grounds of Marlbourne.

His Marlbourne plantation was declared a National Historic Landmark in 1964.

== See also ==
- List of National Historic Landmarks in Virginia
- National Register of Historic Places listings in Hanover County, Virginia
