= Edmund Ruffin =

American planter, politician, scientist, and enslaver (1794–1865)

Edmund Ruffin III
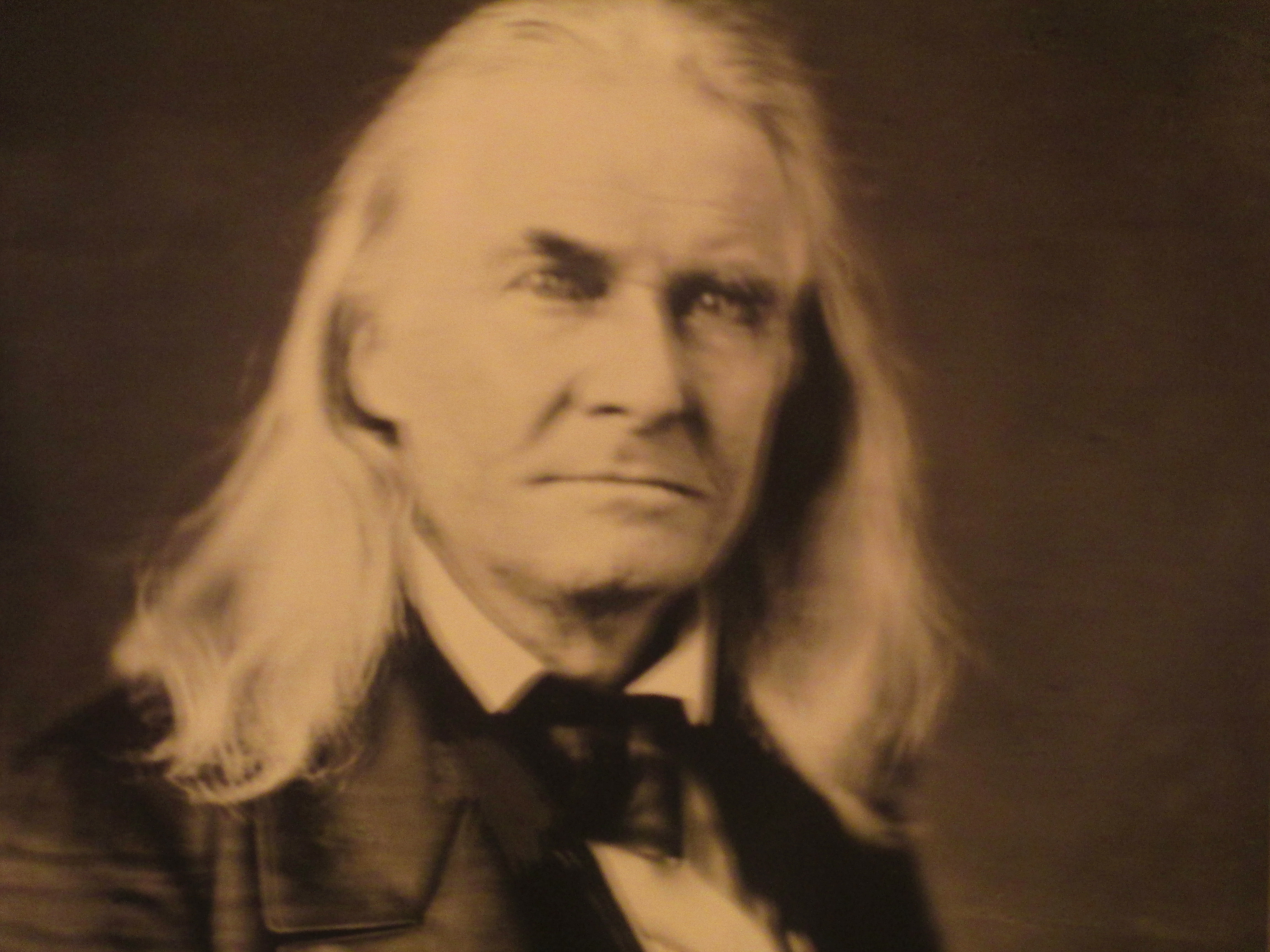
- Photograph of Edmund Ruffin displayed at Fort Sumter National Monument in Charleston, South Carolina

Member of the Virginia Senate
- In office 1823–1827

Personal details
- Born: January 5, 1794 Prince George County, Virginia, U.S.
- Died: June 17, 1865 (aged 71) Redmoor, Amelia County, Virginia, U.S.
- Cause of death: Suicide by gunshot
- Resting place: Marlbourne (Edmund Ruffin Plantation), Hanover County, Virginia, U.S.
- Spouse: Susan Hutchings Travis (m. 1813–1846)
- Relations: William Randolph (ancestor)
- Children: 11
- Education: College of William and Mary
- Occupation: Planter; agronomist; author; soldier
- Known for: Revolutionizing Southern agriculture; his claim to have fired the first shot of the Civil War
- Military career
- Allegiance: United States; Confederate States
- Branch: Virginia militia; Confederate States Army
- Service years: 1812; 1861–1865
- Rank: Private
- Units: 4th Virginia Infantry; Palmetto Guards
- Conflicts: War of 1812; American Civil War; Battle of Fort Sumter

Edmund Ruffin III (January 5, 1794 – June 17, 1865) was an American planter, politician, scientist, and activist best known as an early advocate for secession of the Southern slave states from the United States. He served in the Virginia Senate from 1823 to 1827. In the three decades before the American Civil War he published polemics in support of states' rights and the protection of chattel slavery, earning notoriety as one of the so-called Fire-Eaters. Ruffin was present at the Battle of Fort Sumter in April 1861 and fired one cannon shot at the fort. This gave rise to the legend that Ruffin fired the first shot of the Civil War. Ruffin did enlist as a Confederate soldier despite his advanced age. When the war ended in defeat in 1865, he died of suicide rather than accept what he called "Yankee rule."

Ruffin is also known for his pioneering work in methods to preserve and improve soil productivity. He recommended crop rotation and amendments to restore soils exhausted from tobacco monoculture. Early in his career, he studied bogs and swamps to learn how to correct soil acidity. He published essays and, in 1832, a book on his findings for improving soils. He has since become known as "the father of soil science" in the United States.

== Early life ==
Ruffin was born on January 5, 1794, at Evergreen Plantation just east of Hopewell in Prince George County, Virginia. A descendant of William Randolph, he was born into Virginia's planter class aristocracy and inherited large tracts of land along the James River. His father was George Ruffin (1765–1810) and Edmund was named after his grandfather, Edmund Ruffin (1744–1807), who represented Prince George County in the Virginia House of Delegates during the American Revolutionary War (1775–1778, 1782–1788). He received a private education typical of his class, then attended the College of William and Mary in Williamsburg, Virginia.

== War of 1812 ==
Ruffin enlisted as a private in the Virginia Militia during the War of 1812, and served as secretary of the 4th Virginia Infantry, but did not experience battle. Decades later, he enlisted in the Palmetto Guards of South Carolina.

== Career ==
=== Planter and intellectual ===
Ruffin, like many other planters in Virginia, farmed using slaves. He owned several plantations, including Coggins Point and Shellbanks, in Prince George County. In 1820, he owned 52 enslaved people in Prince George county, which number had grown by 1830 to 86 enslaved people, and by 1840 grew to 96 enslaved people. The 1850 census was the first with separate slave schedules, and by then Edmund Ruffin owned 84 enslaved people in Prince George county, and 41 enslaved people in Hanover County, Virginia. In the 1860 census, 31 slaves of Edmund Ruffin were leased to someone in Charles City county, his sons Edmund Ruffin Jr. and J. C. Ruffin owned 95 slaves and 22 slaves, respectively in Prince George county, and one of the Edmund Ruffins owned additional slaves in Hanover County.

While in his twenties, Ruffin began experimenting with marl to rejuvenate the soil on his land, which had been worn out by more than a century of monoculture of tobacco, a crop that consumes many nutrients from the soil. An educated man, Ruffin was interested in agricultural science but did not like farming nor supervising slaves. In 1835 he changed his primary home from his plantation in Prince George to the City of Petersburg. Thus, he became an absentee landowner, leaving overseers responsible for the day management of his plantations and supervision of slaves. In 1843, Ruffin purchased another plantation, Marlbourne, in Hanover County, nearer Richmond, and moved there from Petersburg. Tobacco had long been cultivated on the land, and the soil was exhausted, so Ruffin became a serious agronomist and pioneered promoting conservation and soil rejuvenation.

Ruffin became one of a circle of intellectuals who worked to change various aspects of Southern life. His colleagues included Nathaniel Beverley Tucker, George Frederick Holmes, James Henry Hammond, and William Gilmore Simms. Their interests spanned Southern society. For example, Ruffin edited writings of William Byrd of Westover Plantation The Westover Manuscripts, containing a history of the dividing line twixt Virginia and North Carolina: a Journey to the Land of Eden A.D. 1733 and a Progress to the Mines. (Published in Petersburg, Virginia in 1841 and in Albany, New York in 2 volumes in 1866). Many in the group argued "stewardship" justified slavery, influenced by the evangelical tradition that generated reform in the North as well, and published their recommendations and "jeremiads" in short-lived periodicals and felt unjustly neglected by fellow Southerners.

For a time in the 1840s, Ruffin was editor of the Farmers Register. He experimented using lime to raise pH in peat soils. Ruffin presented a paper, later expanded into an article for American Farmer and eventually into the highly influential book An Essay on Calcareous Manures (1852). He explained how applications of calcareous earths (marl) had reduced soil acidity and improved yields of mixed crops of corn and wheat on his land, which had been worn out by two centuries of tobacco farming. These works and others have led to his being called the "father of soil science" in modern times.

During the pre-war years, Ruffin also studied the origin of bogs and published several detailed descriptions of the Dismal and Blackwater swamps in Virginia. Some now consider Ruffin better known for his substantive contributions to agriculture, rather than his claim to have fired the first shot of the Civil War at Fort Sumter. However, his advice to use marl was not widely followed in his own time. In an 1852 address, he warned planters that not paying attention to their soil could lead to ruin, and the South suffered from exhausted soils after the Civil War.

=== Pro-slavery activism ===
Ruffin strongly supported slavery and what he considered the Southern way of life. He became increasingly outspoken as sectional hostilities heightened in the 1850s. Some called him a Fire Eater because he advocated secession and armed conflict in defense of the South. Noting how his audience had changed, he wrote in his diary in January 1859, "I have had more notice taken on my late pamphlet [on slavery] than on anything I ever wrote before."

In 1859, Ruffin traveled to attend the execution of John Brown at Charles Town, Virginia (now West Virginia), following the abolitionist's abortive slave revolt at Harper's Ferry earlier that year. To gain access to the event, Ruffin joined the Virginia Military Institute corps of cadets (from which his son had graduated). Wearing a borrowed overcoat and carrying a weapon, the aging, white-haired secessionist marched into Charles Town with the young cadets who had been ordered up from Lexington. Ruffin would soon collect several of the pikes captured from Brown and his forces, which had been intended to arm slaves in a general uprising. Ruffin sent a pike to each of the governors of the slave-holding states, except Delaware, as proof of violent Northern enmity against the South and slavery.

In 1860, Ruffin published his book, Anticipations of the Future, to Serve as Lessons for the Present Time. Written in the form of letters to the London Times from 1864 to 1870 from a fictional English resident in the United States, he played out the result of the election of Republican candidates in the United States. He predicted an American civil war in 1868 that would follow the re-election of President William H. Seward, and predicted that it would ultimately result in a victory for Southern states. Although most of his predictions were wrong, Ruffin did correctly predict that the war would start with a Southern attack on Fort Sumter in South Carolina. He was also correct on some of the finer details, such as Salmon P. Chase being appointed to the position of Chief Justice of the Supreme Court of the United States.

== Civil War ==
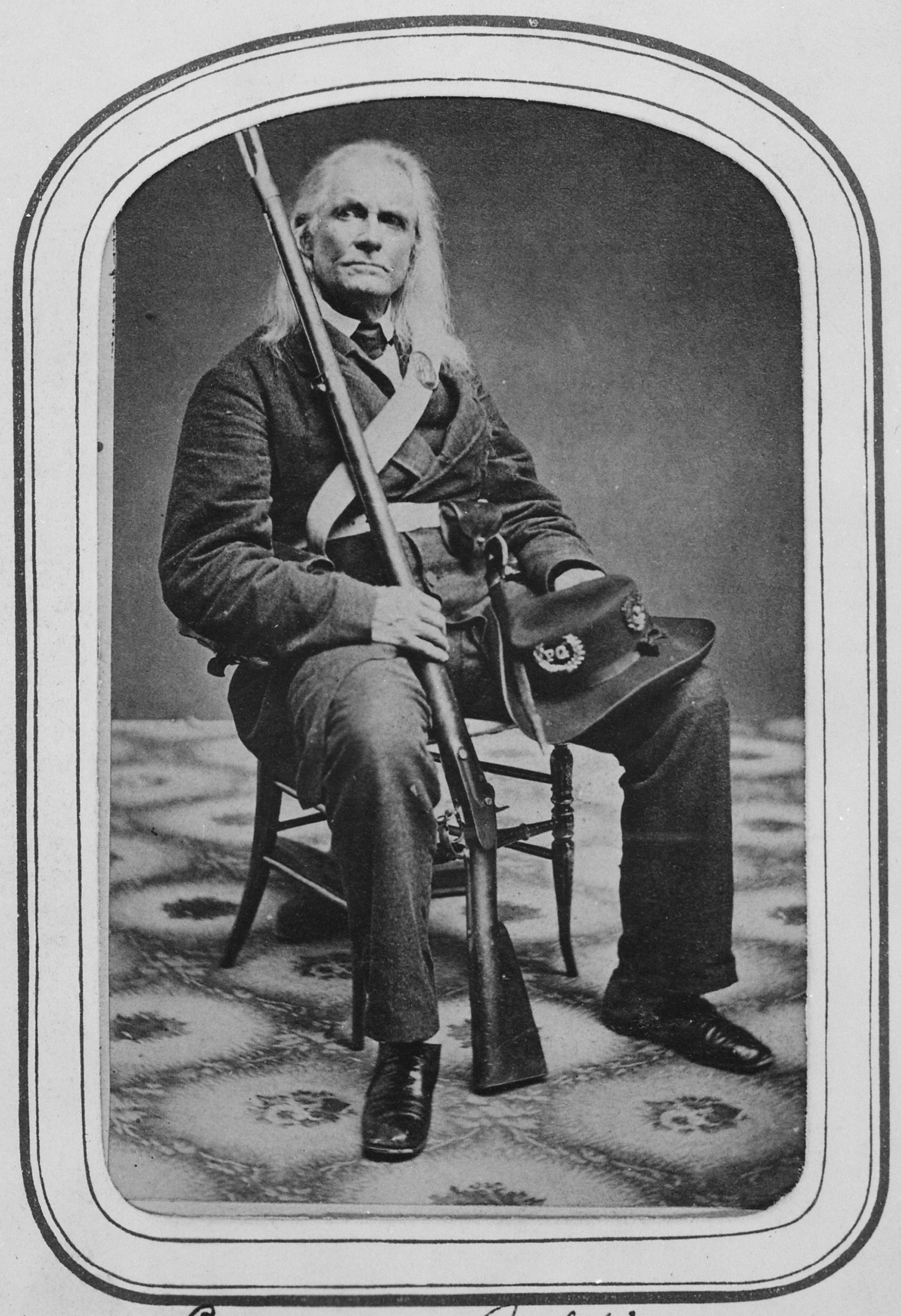
Edmund Ruffin in the uniform of the "Palmetto Guards" 1861

After the election of Abraham Lincoln as president in 1860, Ruffin traveled to South Carolina, where he had previously worked as an agronomist, hoping to encourage secession (perhaps because, as Swanberg says, his fellow Virginians found his views too extreme). He wrote to his son, "The time since I have been here has been the happiest of my life." Ruffin is credited with firing one of the first shots from Morris Island against the federally held Fort Sumter on April 12, 1861, which is generally considered the military event that initiated the war; the actual first shot against Fort Sumter was a signal shot by Lt. Henry S. Farley from Fort Johnson under the command of Captain George S. James. Ruffin was also the first person to enter Fort Sumter after it fell to Southern forces.

During the Civil War, his grandson Julian Beckwith was one of the first Petersburg Confederate soldiers to fall during the Battle of Seven Pines on May 31, 1862. As Union forces threatened Richmond the next summer, Ruffin left Marlbourne for Beechwood, the Prince George County home of his son, Edmund Ruffin Jr. In June 1864, after the Army of the Potomac under General Ulysses S. Grant stealthily crossed the James River into Prince George over a hastily constructed pontoon bridge a few miles east of Beechwood at Flowerdew Hundred, Ruffin allegedly escaped capture by hiding under a load of hay in a wagon driven by one of his slaves. He fled west to the relative safety of another son's plantation home, Redmoor, in Confederate-held territory west of Petersburg in Amelia County. Several of Ruffin's plantations were occupied and plundered by Union forces during the war. His plantation on Coggins Point was the scene of the Beefsteak Raid during the Siege of Petersburg.

== Personal life ==
In 1813, Ruffin married Susan Hutchings Travis of Williamsburg. The couple moved to a plantation that Ruffin inherited from his namesake grandfather, at Coggin's Point, along the James River in Prince George County, which was noted as the departure point of Benedict Arnold after he switched allegiances and raided along the James River (including Richmond) in 1781. They had eleven children before Susan Ruffin died in 1846.

Most of the children died before their father did. Rebecca Ruffin Bland (1823–1855), Jane Ruffin Dupuy (1829–1855), and Ella Ruffin (1832–1855) all died in 1855. Elizabeth Ruffin Sayre (1821–1860). Ann Ruffin (1844–1863) died during the Civil War. Julian Calx Ruffin (1821–1864), a soldier, died at the Battle of Drewry's Bluff). The firstborn daughter, Agnes Ruffin Beckwith (1816–1865), died the same year as her father. The three survivors were Edmund Ruffin Jr. (1814–1875), Charles Lorraine Ruffin (1832–1870), and George Champion Ruffin (1845–1913).

== Death and legacy ==
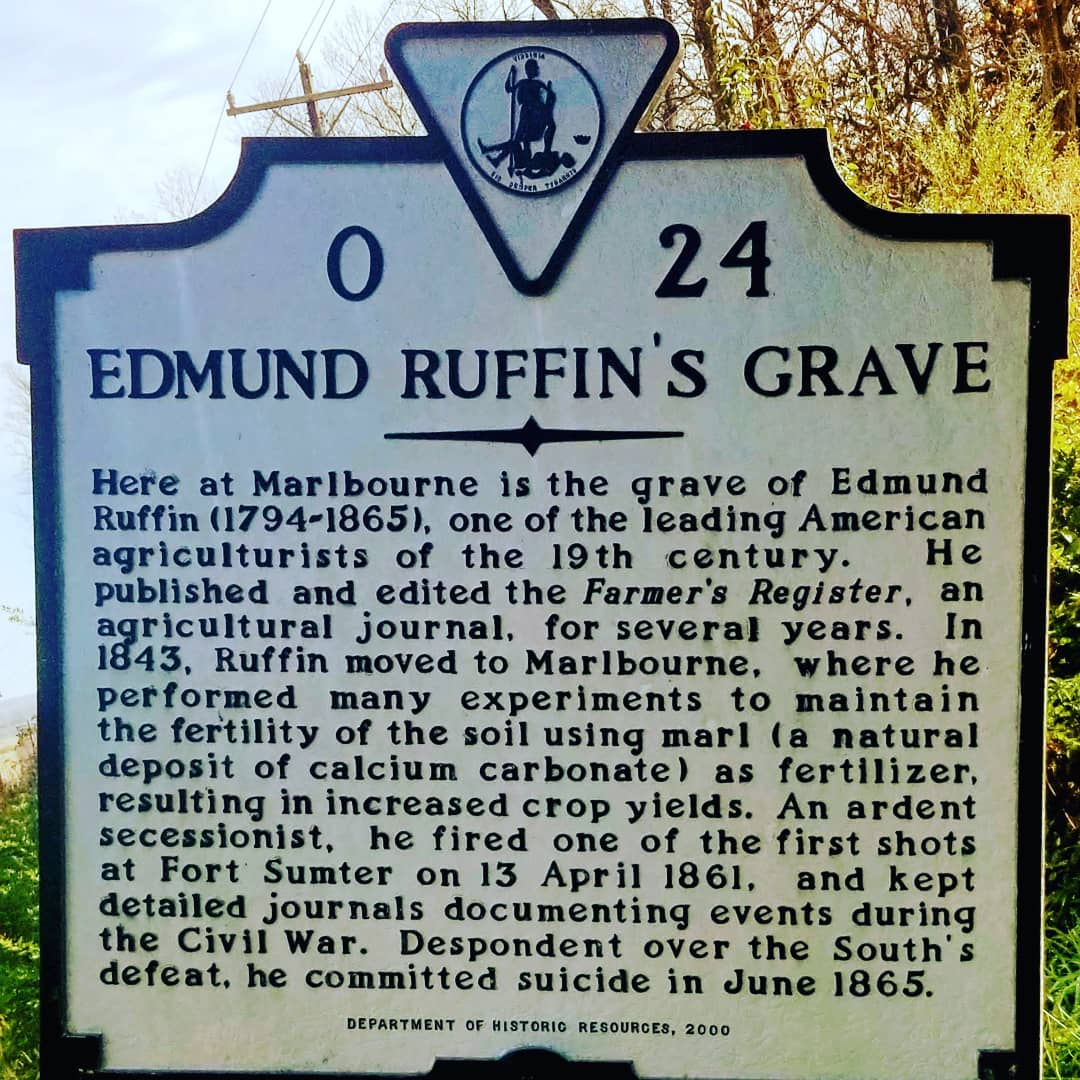
Historic marker, Hanover County, Virginia

When the war ended with Confederate defeat, Ruffin, who had already suffered the loss of his wife and eight of his eleven children, was crushed. Increasingly despondent after the surrender of Robert E. Lee at Appomattox Court House in 1865, along with the other surrenders that were to follow, Ruffin decided to die of suicide. On June 18, 1865, while staying with his son and daughter-in-law at Redmoor in Amelia County, Ruffin went up to his room with a rifle and a forked stick. He was called away to greet visitors at the front door. After they left, Ruffin returned to write a final diary entry:

I here declare my unmitigated hatred to Yankee rule—to all political, social & business connection with Yankees—& to the Yankee race. Would that I could impress these sentiments, in their full force, on every living southerner, & bequeath them to every one yet to be born! May such sentiments be held universally in the outraged & down-trodden South, though in silence & stillness, until the now far-distant day shall arrive for just retribution for Yankee usurpation, oppression, & atrocious outrages—& for deliverance & vengeance for the now ruined, subjugated, & enslaved Southern States!

Ruffin wrapped himself in a Confederate flag, put the rifle muzzle in his mouth, and used the forked stick to manipulate the trigger. The percussion cap went off without firing the rifle, and the noise alerted Ruffin's daughter-in-law. However, by the time she and his son reached his room, Ruffin had reloaded the rifle with another cap and fired a fatal shot. Edmund Jr. and neighbor William H. Harrison (cousin of the president) transported his body to Marlbourne, his plantation in Hanover County, Virginia, for burial.

Both Evergreen, the plantation house which his father built in 1807, and the plantation on which Edmund was born, and Marlbourne remain today and are designated as National Historic Landmarks. Ruffin is often called the "father of soil science" in the United States, and his writings have been influential in soil conservation.

Ruffin had long proven himself to be a dedicated diarist. He posted three diary entries on the day of his suicide, indicating that day to be June 18, which fell on Sunday. Nevertheless, the date was called into question by his son Edmund Jr.'s June 20 letter, which advised brothers George and Thomas of the death. Edmund Jr.'s letter, which surfaced in 1924, unambiguously related the death to have occurred "Saturday last at 12 1/2 o'clock" which was June 17. Biographers Allmendinger and Scarborough extensively reviewed Ruffin's diary entries and the son's letter, as well as the circumstances of burial and newspaper publication of the death, and they have debated the case to be made for the 17th and the 18th dates. They have both concluded June 17 to be the more probable date of death, and that Ruffin had become confused and erred in dating his final diary entries.

== Works by Edmund Ruffin ==
- Slavery and Free Labor, Described and Compared / by Edmund Ruffin Accessed December 8, 2006.
- Ruffin, Edmund (1832). An Essay on Calcareous Manures. Richmond, Va.: J.W. Randolph. "Ruffin An Essay on Calcareous Manures ."
- Ruffin, Edmund (c. 1857). The Political Economy of Slavery, or, The Institution Considered in Regard to Its Influence on Public Wealth and the General Wealth. Washington, DC: L. Towers.
- Ruffin, Edmund (1860). Anticipations of the Future, to Serve as Lessons for the Present Time: In the Form of Extracts of Letters from an English Resident in the United States, to the London Times (sic), from 1864 to 1870. J.W. Randolph.
- Ruffin, Edmund (1989) [1856-1865]. The Diary of Edmund Ruffin. Edited, with an introd. and notes, by William Kauffman Scarborough. With a foreword by Avery Craven (3 v.). Baton Rouge: Louisiana State University Press. ISBN 0-8071-0948-7.
- Ruffin, Edmund (2006). Nature's Management: Writings on Landscape and Reform, 1822-1859, edited by Jack Temple Kirby. Athens, Georgia: University of Georgia Press University Press. ISBN 9780820328379.
