= James River plantations =

James River plantations were established in the Virginia Colony along the James River between the mouth at Hampton Roads and the head of navigation at the Fall Line where Richmond is today.

== History ==
The colony struggled for five years after its establishment at Jamestown in 1607. Finally, a profitable export crop was identified through the efforts of colonist John Rolfe. After 1612, a sweet form of tobacco became the largest export crop, customarily shipped in large hogsheads.

Because the river was a highway of commerce in the 17th and 18th centuries, the early plantations were established on the north and south banks along it, with most having their own wharfs. Most were much larger than 100 acres (0.40 km^{2}). The name derived from the English tradition of subdividing shires/counties into hundreds.

While some are now long gone, some of the larger and older of the James River plantations are still in use and/or open to the public. Almost all are privately owned, and houses and/or grounds are generally open daily to visitors with various admission fees applicable.

== Partial listing of plantations in early 17th century ==
Based upon the makeup of the House of Burgesses in 1619, a partial list of early plantations and their representatives were:

- Argall's Gift Plantation: Thomas Pawlett and Edward Gourgainy
- Captain Lawne's Plantation: Captain Christopher Lawne and Ensign Washer
- Captain Warde's Plantation: Captain John Warde and Lieutenant John Gibbes or John Gibbs
- Charles City: Samuel Sharpe (burgess) and Samuel Jordanfor James City: Ensign William Spence (burgess) sometimes spelled Spense and Captain William Powell
- Flowerdew Hundred Plantation: Ensign Edmund Rossingham and John Jefferson (burgess)
- Henricus: Thomas Dowse and John Pollington or John Plentine or Polentine
- Kiccowtan: Captain William Tucker and William Capps
- Martin's Brandon, Captain John Martin's Plantation: Thomas Davis and Robert Stacy
- Martin's Hundred Plantation (also known as Wolstenholme Towne): John Boyse or Boys and John Jackson (burgess)
- Smythe's Hundred Plantation: Captain Thomas Graves and Walter Shelley

== Plantations north side of James River ==
Listed from east to west (downriver to upriver):

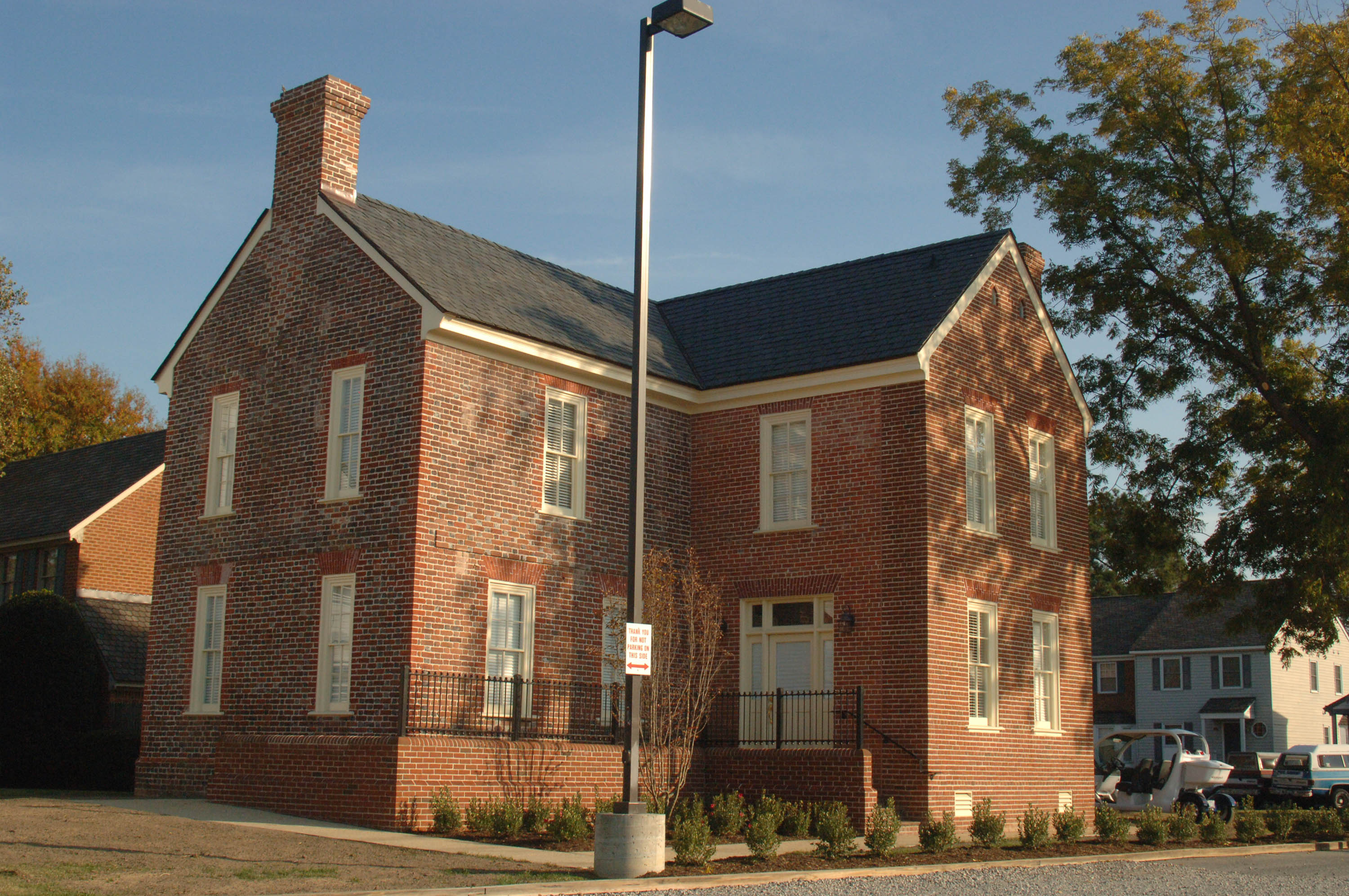
- Herbert House
  Herbert House
- Marie's Mount
- Blunt Point
- Denbigh
- Boldrup/Bolthrope
- Richneck
- Stanley Hundred
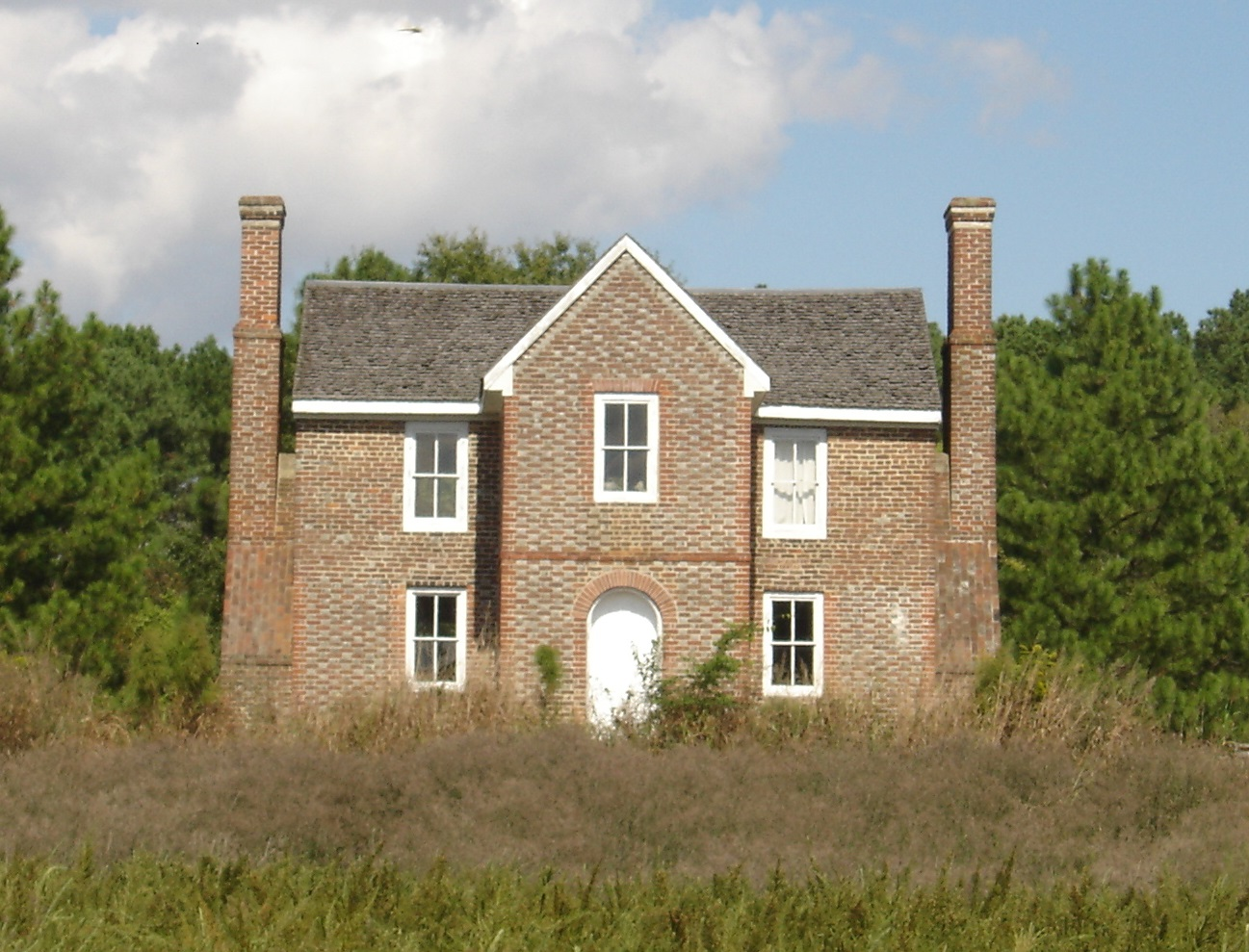
- Matthew Jones House (Bourbon)
  Bourbon (Matthew Jones House)
- Endview
- Lee Hall is a large 19th-century Italianate plantation house built in 1859 as the home of Richard Decatur Lee, a prominent local planter who was not directly related to the famous Confederate general Robert E. Lee. The mansion was used as headquarters for Confederate generals Joseph E. Johnston and John B. Magruder during the Peninsula Campaign of the American Civil War in 1862. Lee Hall Mansion is now a museum.
- Queen Hith
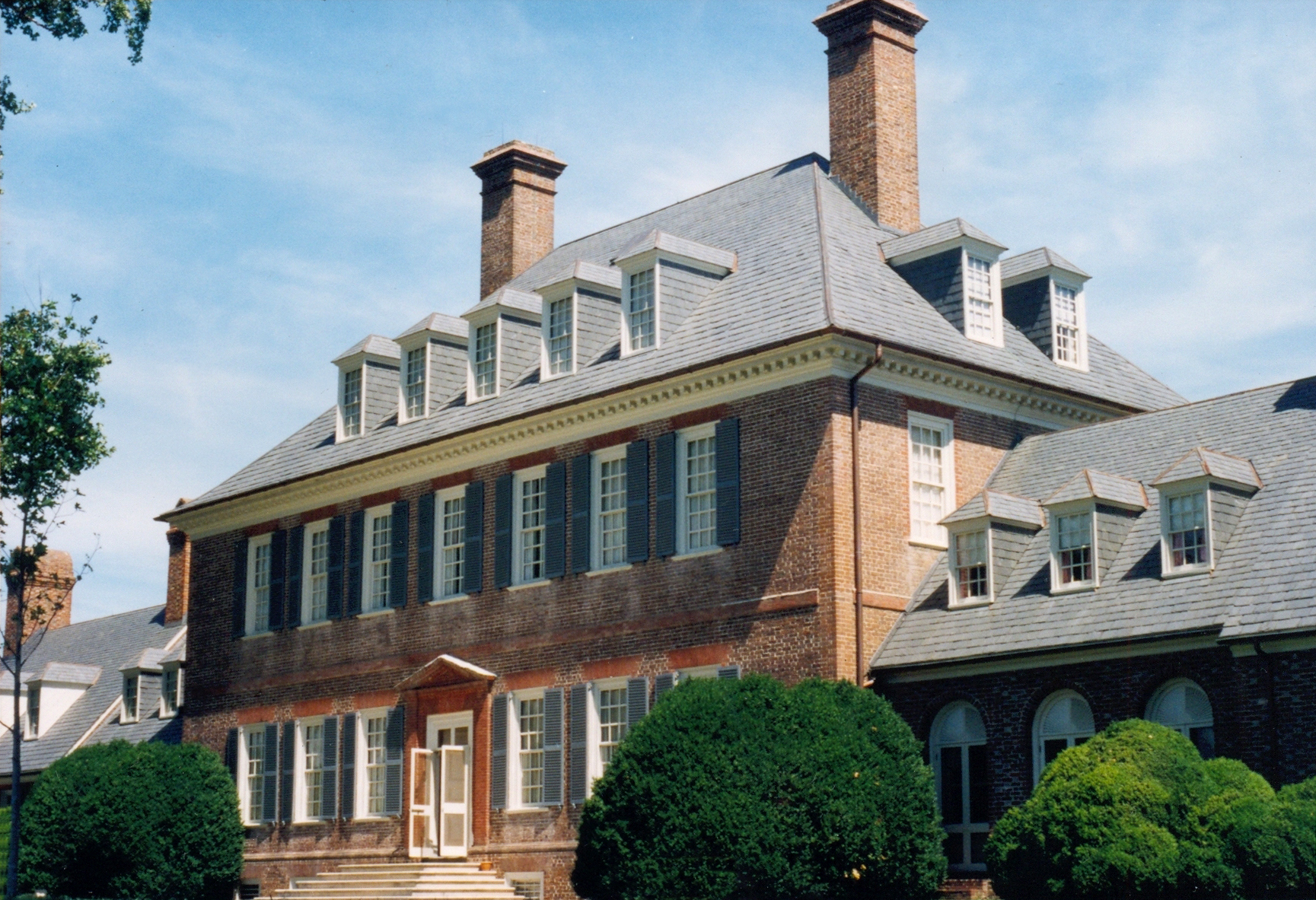
- Carter's Grove
  Carter's Grove stands on the former site of Martin's Hundred Plantation and Wolstenholme Towne.
- Kingsmill
- Ambler Mansion In the two centuries following the arrival of the English colonists, the island landscape on Jamestown Island evolved from the seat of the colonial government to large plantations owned by the Ambler and Travis families. Built circa 1750 by Richard Ambler, 350 yards east of the old Jamestown Church, the two-story, center-hall, single-pile, brick house with walls laid in Flemish bond with few glazed headers was typical of early Georgian architecture. The home was burned during the American Revolution but was restored by Colonel John Ambler. The mansion by then owned by William Allen was burned again by runaway slaves during the Civil War, and was restored a second time. When the house burned for a third time in 1895 it was abandoned but its ruins still stand and have been stabilized by the National Park Service.
- Powhatan
- Green Spring
- Tomahund Tomahund is a plantation located just west of the Chickahominy River. The manor house built in the mid-18th century was a long gambrel-roofed wood-frame structure. The house at Tomahund resembled neighboring Tedington, and like Tedington it also had a two-level portico added. Although the 18th-century manor house no longer stands, Tomahund is a working plantation in the 21st century.
- Tedington Tedington was built ca. 1750 by William Lightfoot on a tract of land at Sandy Point that had been acquired by his grandfather Phillip Lightfoot who arrived in the Virginia Colony in the late 17th century and became a wealthy merchant in Yorktown. The house was a long wood-frame structure with a gambrel roof and a two-level portico that was added at a later date. The house was destroyed by fire in 1928.
- Rowe Plantation was situated on Sandy Point along the James River. The 3 part house of architectural significance no longer exists. Owned early in its history by the Minge family. Other owners have been Lightfoot, Bolling and Harrison families.
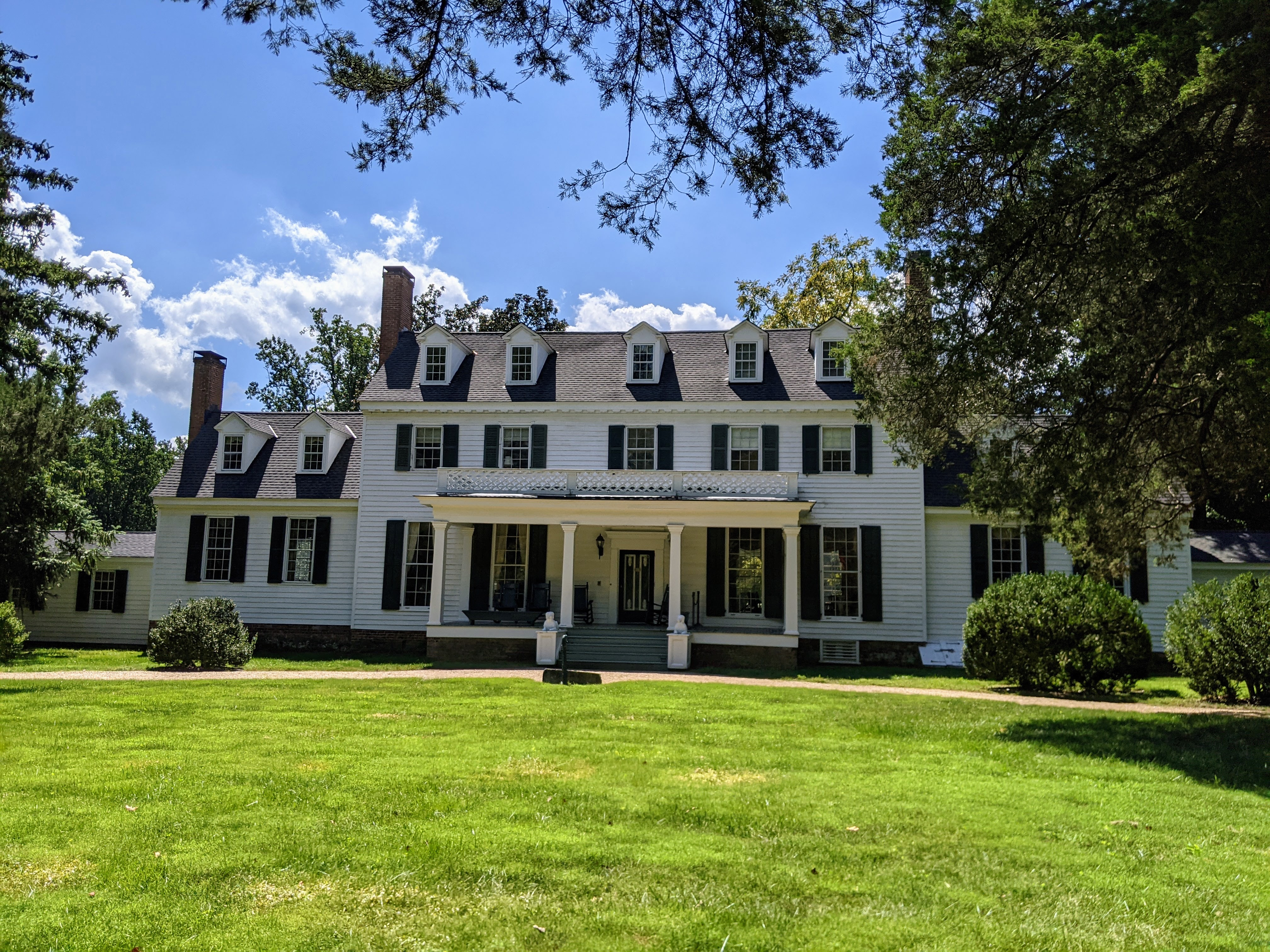
- Sherwood Forest
  Sherwood Forest is the home of President John Tyler, the first Vice President to ascend to the presidency. Tyler was twice Governor of Virginia, a U.S. Senator, a member of the U.S. House of Representatives, a Virginia state senator and member of the Virginia House of Delegates. A graduate of the College of William & Mary, he later became Chancellor of that institution. As a supporter of slavery, he re-entered public service in 1861 as an elected member of the Confederate Congress. He died in 1862. The house and its 1600 acres (6.5 km^{2}) have been continuously owned by his direct descendants. In the mid-1970s, the residence was restored by President Tyler's grandson, Harrison Ruffin Tyler, and his wife, the current owners.

The House, circa 1730, is Virginia Tidewater in architectural design, and is the longest frame dwelling in America. It was expanded to its present length, 300 feet (90 m), by President Tyler in 1845, when he added the 68-foot (21 m) ballroom designed for dancing the Virginia reel. Sherwood Forest is a National Historic Landmark, Virginia Historic Landmark, and listed on the National Register of Historic Places. Sherwood Forest is open to the public seven days a week, 9:00 a.m. to 5:00 p.m.

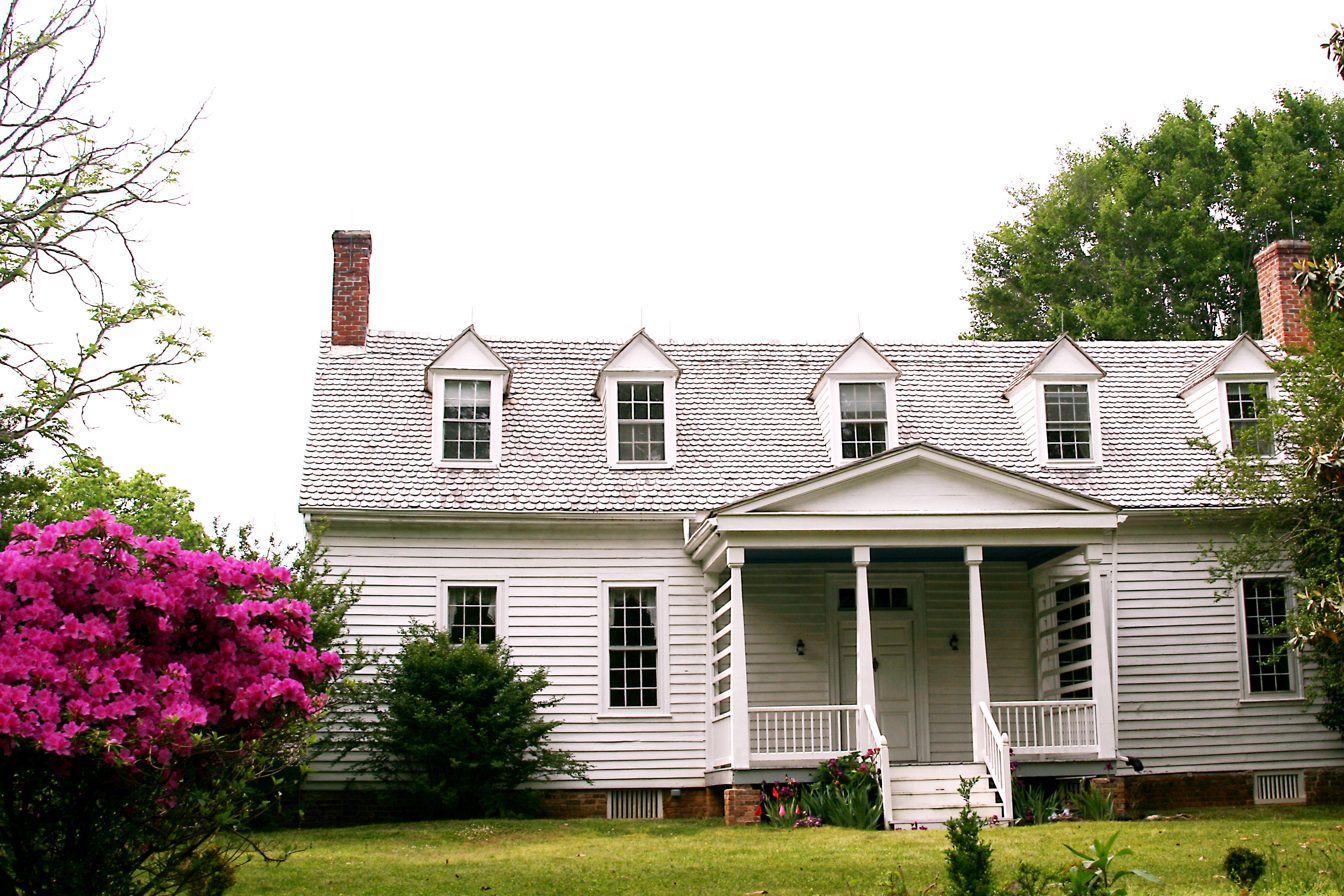
- Kittiewan
  Kittiewan, originally known as Millford, overlooking Kittiewan Creek and the James River, is a typical Colonial-period medium-size wood-frame plantation house characteristic of the Virginia Tidewater. Built in the 18th century, its first known owner was Dr. William Rickman. In 1776 Rickman was appointed by the Continental Congress to oversee the Virginia hospitals during the American Revolution. During the early 20th century, the magnificent paneled interior was identified as a potential acquisition for the Metropolitan Museum of Arts' American Wing, although the owners did not entertain the thought of removing this significant feature of the house. Stewardship of the house and surrounding 720 acres (2.9 km^{2}) is administered by the Archeological Society of Virginia. The house and grounds are open to the public by appointment.
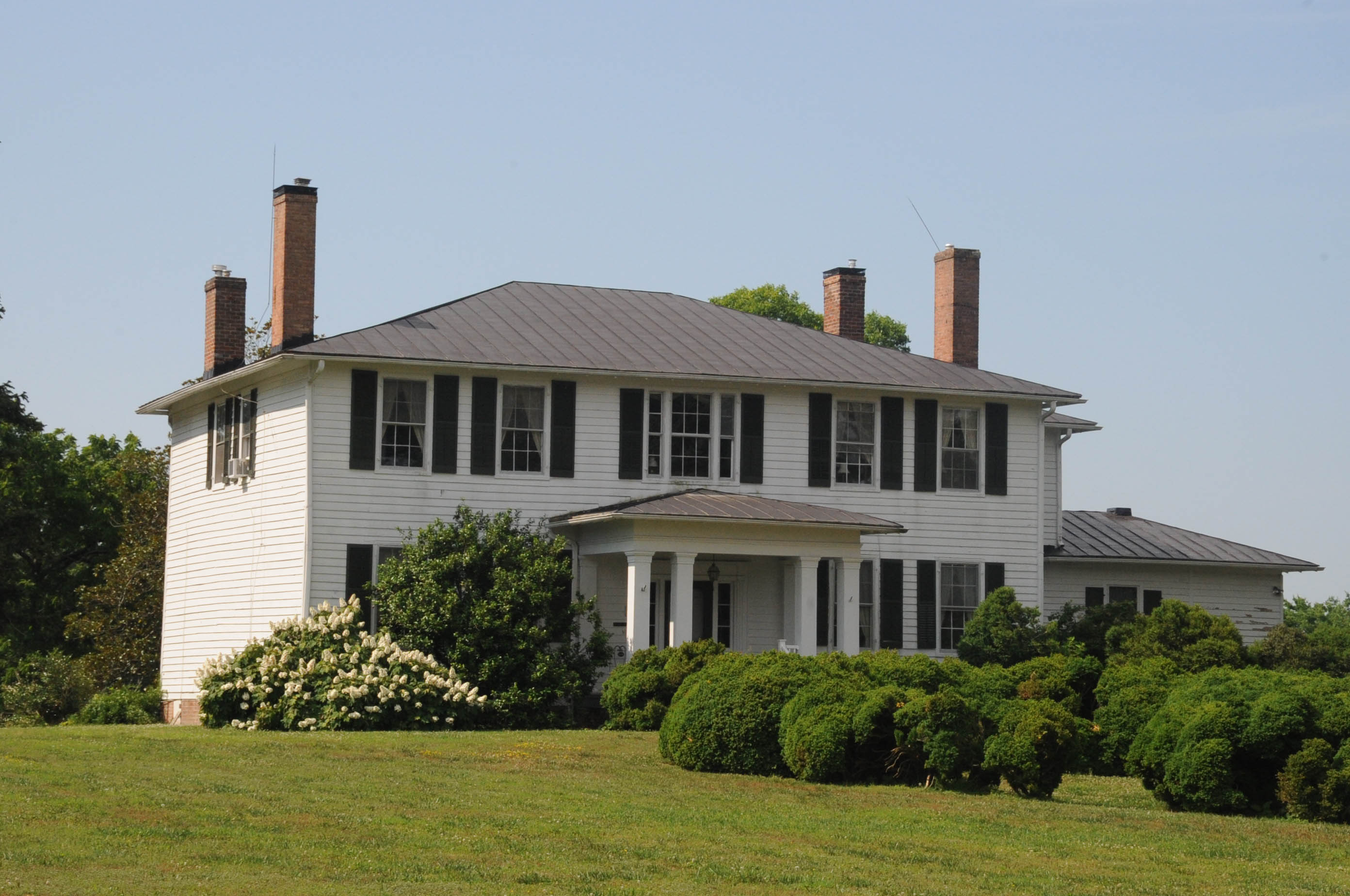
- North Bend Plantation
  North Bend Plantation was built in 1819 by John Minge. In 1853 the home was doubled in size by Thomas Willcox. Architectural detailing from the expansion included Greek Revival detailing reminiscent of the designs of builder/architect Asher Benjamin. In 1864, during the American Civil War, North Bend served as the headquarters of Major General Phillip Sheridan as 30,000 Union troops prepared to cross the James River on a pontoon bridge. The home has been in Copland family since 1916. It is listed on the National Register of Historic Places. The grounds are open daily from 9:00 a.m. to 5:00 p.m. daily and guided tours of the house are available daily by appointment.
- Weyanoke
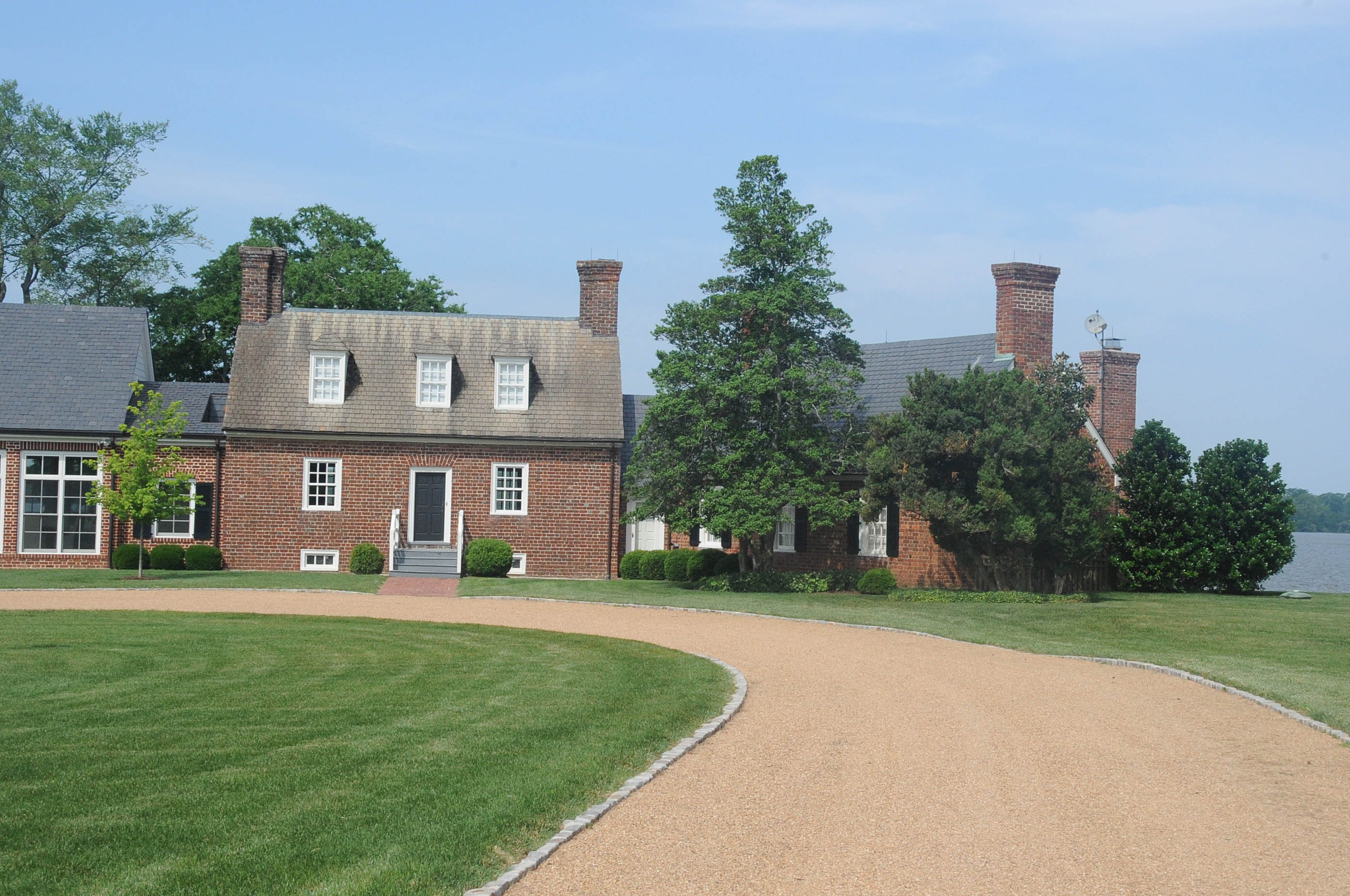
- Upper Weyanoke
  Upper Weyanoke The plantation site was settled by English colonists during the 17th century and has been continuously occupied ever since, as indicated by archeological investigations. During the 18th century and early 19th century, the locally prominent Minge family owned the property, as well as others on the Weyanoke peninsula, such as North Bend. The one-and-a-half-story, early 19th-century brick cottage was probably built by John Minge as a two-room dependency to a now vanished main dwelling. The grounds of Upper Weyanoke also include a Greek Revival style residence built for Robert Douthat in 1859. The commodious two-story brick home has a side-hall plan typically utilized in urban homes, rather than rural plantation houses.
- Belle Air Plantation is a unique surviving example of a wooden house with post-medieval-type exposed interior framing, and is probably the oldest plantation dwelling along State Route 5. The original five-bay portion of Belle Air possesses architectural details characteristic of seventeenth-century construction, with a floor plan and façade fenestration characteristic of 18th-century design. It is listed on the National Register of Historic Places. The house is open for guided tours during Historic Garden Week and by appointment.
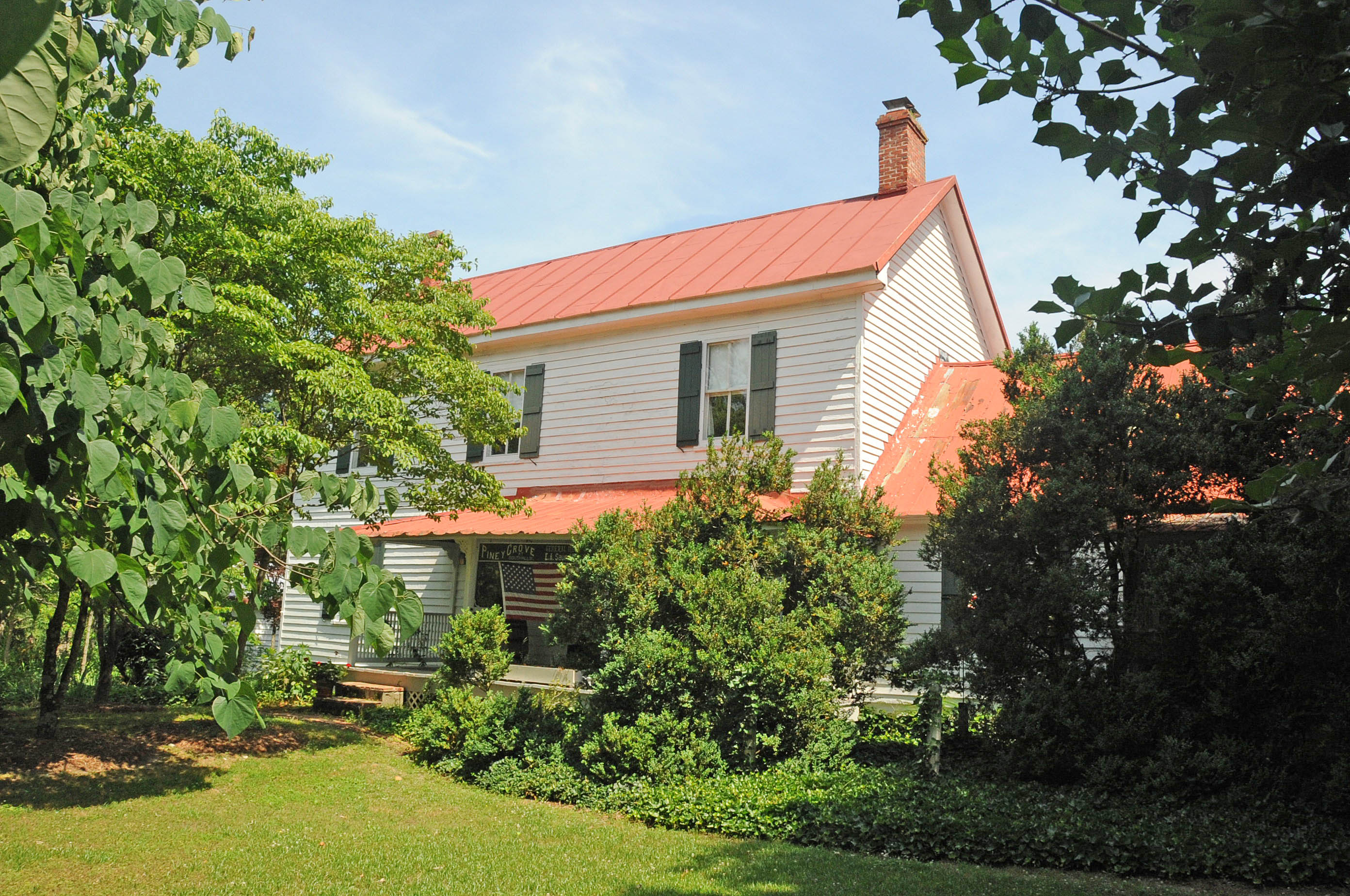
- Piney Grove
  Piney Grove at Southall's Plantation was established in the eighteenth century as a seat of the Southall family. During the late eighteenth century, the 300-acre (1.2 km^{2}) plantation was owned by Furneau Southall. The original log portion of Piney Grove was built before 1790 as a corn crib, later converted and enlarged into a general merchandise store, and in 1905 enlarged and transformed into a residence. The home survives as a rare and well-preserved example of Early Virginia Log Architecture. It is listed on the National Register of Historic Places. The grounds are open daily from 9:00 a.m. to 5:00 p.m. daily and guided tours of the house are available daily by appointment.
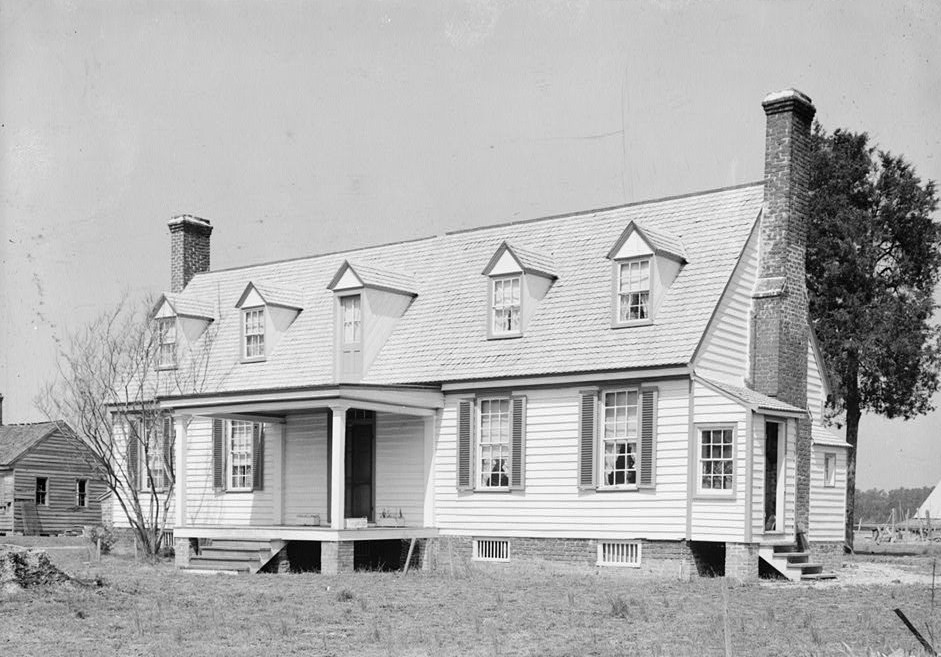
- Greenway Plantation
  Greenway Plantation is a wood-frame, one-and-a-half-story plantation house that stands just north of Route 5 in Charles City County, Virginia. Located just west of the Charles City Courthouse, it is one of Charles City's earliest and most distinctive Colonial plantations and is listed on the National Register of Historic Places. Greenway was built circa 1776 by Judge John Tyler, Sr., the father of president John Tyler. Future President Tyler was born here in 1790. When Judge Tyler died in 1813, John Tyler at the age of 23 inherited Greenway and lived there until age 39 (1829), when he sold the plantation and moved to nearby Sherwood Forest Plantation. The plantation is privately owned and maintained. The structures have remained well-preserved over the years with little alteration.
- Burlington Plantation
- River Edge Once known as Clover Fields, River Edge, as it has been known for the last hundred years or more, stands just west of State Route 5 South, in Charles City County. The property was a grant of ten thousand acres from the crown to Colonel William Cole, Esquire. The grant originally included all of the land along the James River from Gunn's Run to Herring Creek. Due to the destruction of early county records when the Charles City County Courthouse was burned by the Union Army during the Civil War, there is no record of the builder or date of construction for the present house. The deed of 1813 shows that there were four previous owners, and that in 1714 William Cole II, a member of the House of Burgesses, gave his bond, with John Stith as security, to construct warehouses on this land, then known as Swine Yards. Thus it is presumed that the house was built in the early 18th century. The house originally stood closer to the river but was moved to its present location at a later date. In 1769 William Cole IV sold four thousand of his ten thousand acres to William Byrd III of Westover. The nearby river landing known as Wilcox's Wharf, is the location from which a part of General Grant's army ferried across the James to Windmill Point at Flowerdew Hundred en route to lay siege to Petersburg in 1864.
- Evelynton was originally part of William Byrd's expansive Westover Plantation. Named for Byrd's daughter, Evelyn, this site has been home to the Ruffin family since 1847. The 2,500 acre (10 km^{2}) farm is still family owned and operated. It is listed on the National Register of Historic Places. The house, lush grounds and gardens are open daily from 9:00 a.m. to 5:00 p.m. daily.
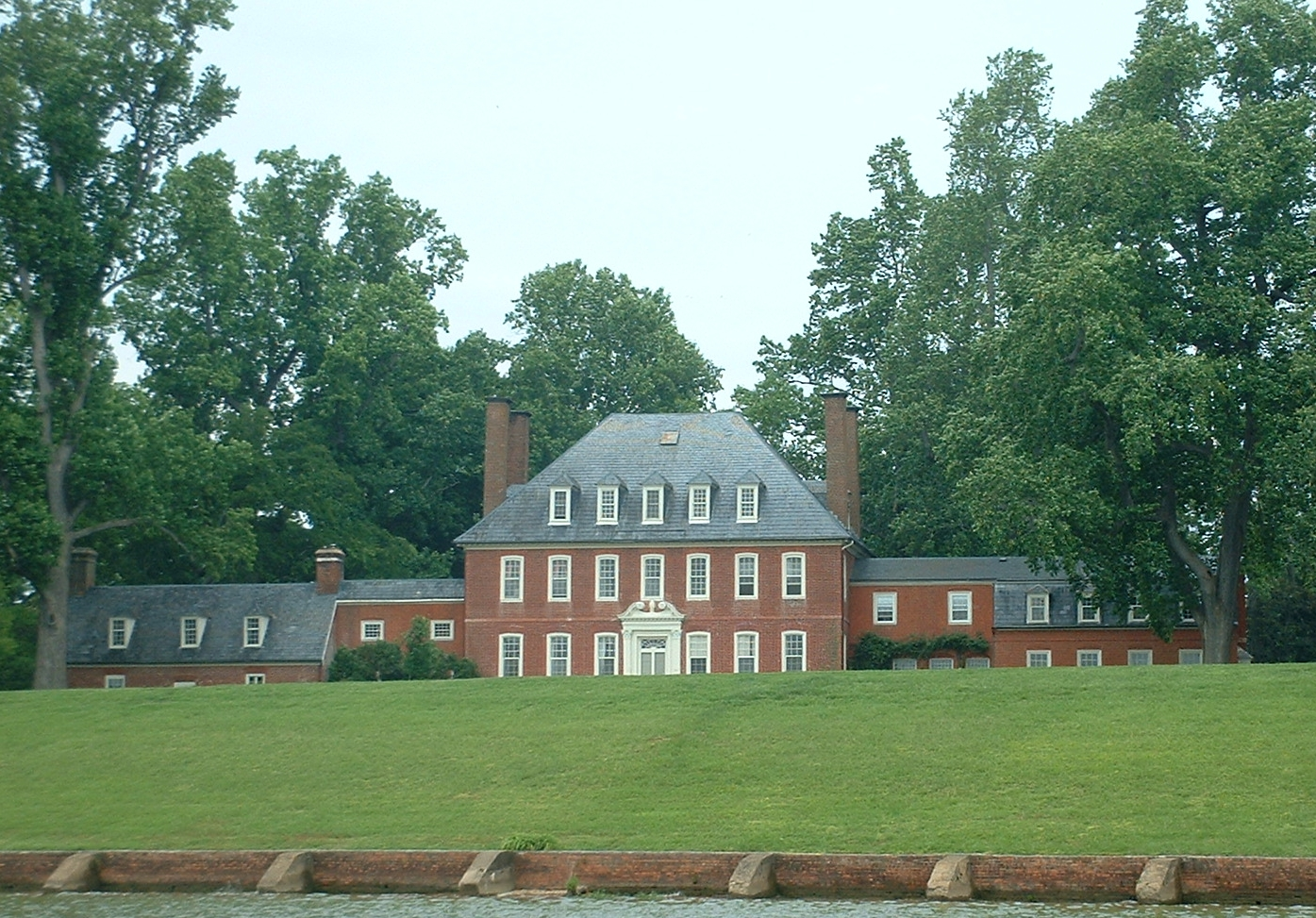
- Westover
  Westover was built circa 1750 by William Byrd III, the son of William Byrd II, the founder of Richmond. It is noteworthy for its secret passages, magnificent gardens, and architectural details. The grounds and garden are open 9 a.m. to 6 p.m. daily, but the house is not open to the public.
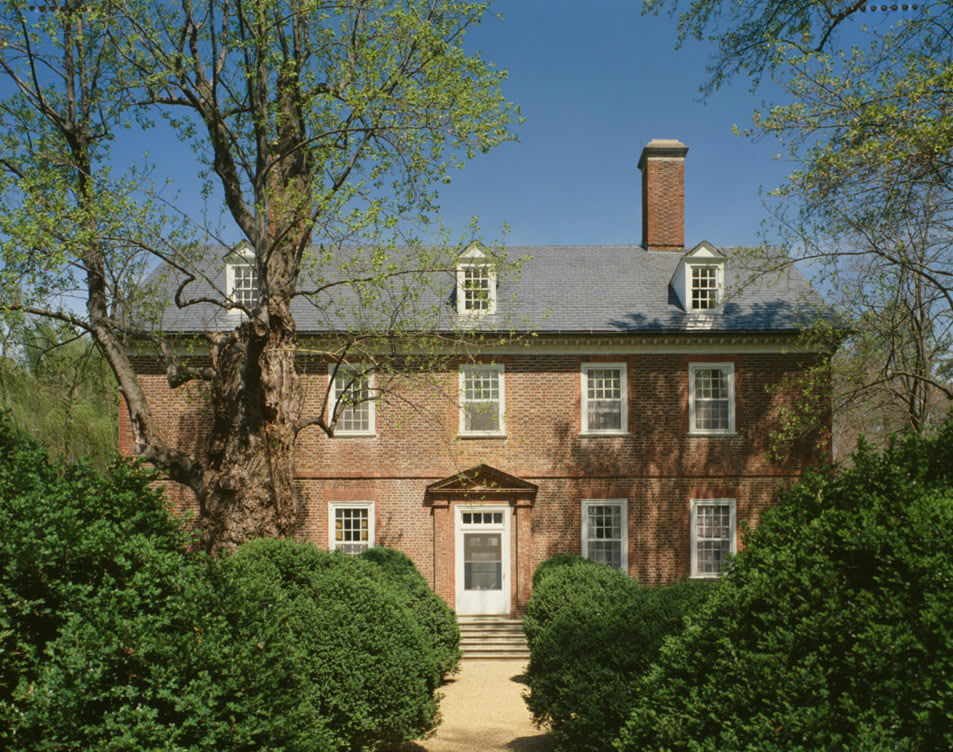
- Berkeley Plantation
  Berkeley Plantation was long the seat of the Harrison family, one of the First Families of Virginia. It was the birthplace of Benjamin Harrison V, son of the builder, who was a signer of the Declaration of Independence and three-time Governor of Virginia. His third son William Henry Harrison, was born at Berkeley. A famous Indian fighter known as "Tippecanoe", William Henry Harrison later became the ninth President of the United States, in 1841, although he died shortly after taking office. His grandson, Benjamin Harrison, was the 23rd President. On December 4, 1619, early settlers from England came ashore at Berkeley and observed the first official Thanksgiving in America. It was also the site of the first playing of Taps at the conclusion of the Peninsula Campaign of 1862 during the American Civil War. It is normally open for tours 8:00 a.m. to 5:00 p.m. daily.
- Edgewood and Harrison's Mill is a unique surviving example of Gothic Revival architecture along State Route 5 and the James River. Edgewood was once part of Berkeley Plantation and the mill was constructed by Benjamin Harrison V. It is listed on the National Register of Historic Places. The grounds are open daily from 9:00 a.m. to 5:00 p.m. daily and guided tours of the house are available daily by appointment.
- Westbury
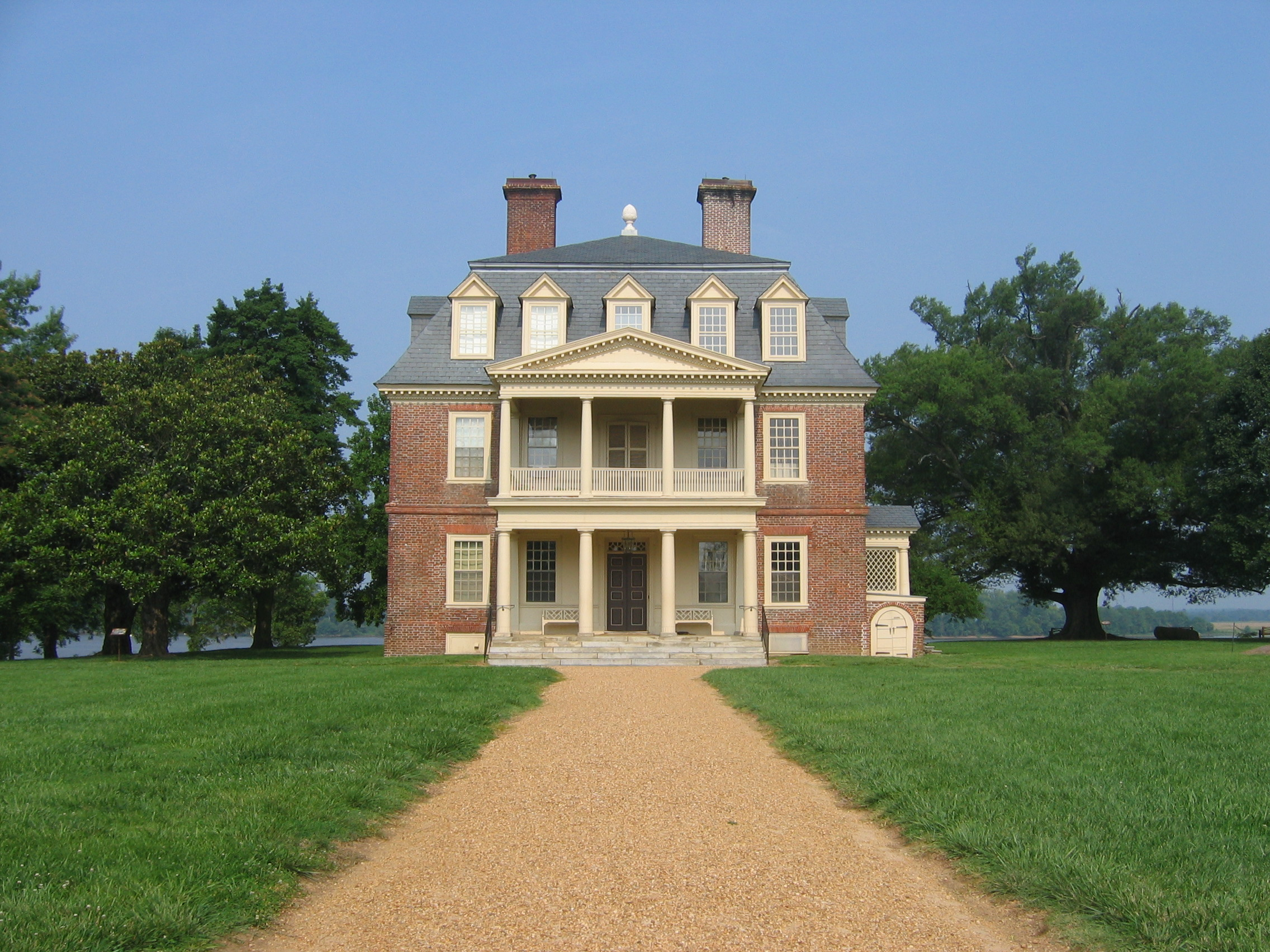
- Shirley Plantation
  Shirley Plantation, settled in 1613, is the oldest plantation in Virginia and the oldest family-owned business in North America, dating back to 1638. Occupied by the Hill family and their descendants since 1738, Shirley was the birthplace of Anne Hill Carter Lee, the mother of Confederate General Robert E. Lee. In 1793, she married Light Horse Harry Lee in the mansion's parlor. Shirley Plantation has been designated a National Historic Landmark. It is normally open for tours 9:30 a.m. to 4:30 p.m. daily.
- Upper Shirley The gracious late 19th-century dwelling at Upper Shirley with its beautiful site overlooking the James River has been the seat of several leading families of the Commonwealth. Built by Hill Carter for his son William Fitzhugh Carter during Reconstruction, a period in which few Virginians could afford to erect substantial residences, the original portion of the dwelling was constructed using bricks salvaged from a large 18th-century building that once formed part of the architectural complex at nearby Shirley Plantation, the seat of the James River branch of the Carter family. The estate is privately owned and is not open to the public.
- Turkey Island
- Malvern Hill
- Curles Neck, was founded in the Varina district of Henrico on 750 acres granted to Ancient Planter Thomas Harris, family seat of the Harris branch of the First Families of Virginia, at the request of Sir Thomas Dale for Harris's service in the early years of the colony. The original house built by Harris in 1633 is one of the oldest in Virginia; and the subject of an ongoing archaeology study. The plantation grew to over 5000 acres in size.
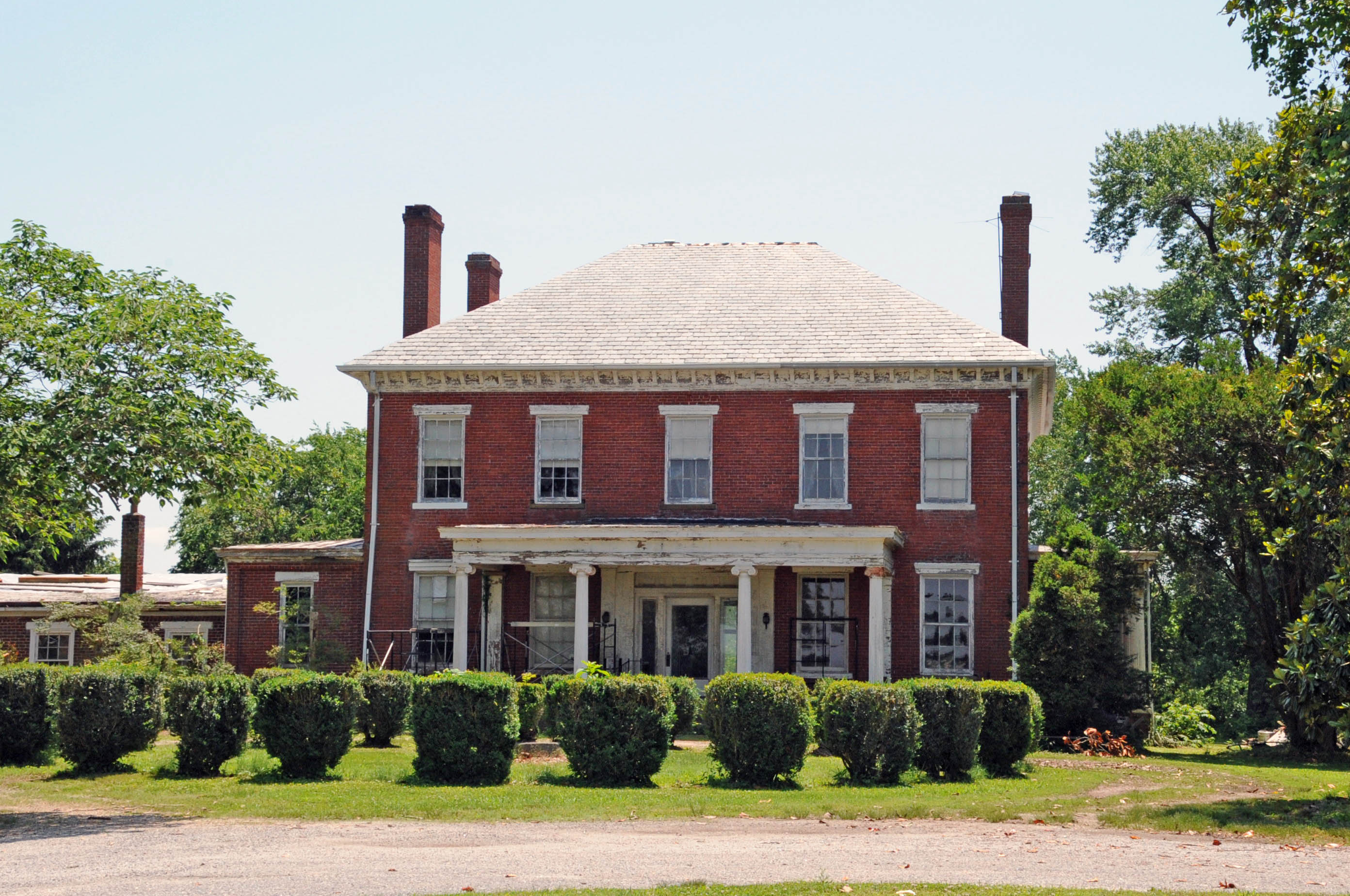
- Varina Farms
  Varina Farms
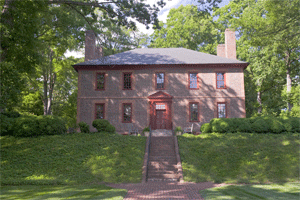
- Wilton
  Wilton - Built circa 1753 for William Randolph III, Wilton was once the centerpiece of a 2,000-acre (8.1 km^{2}) tobacco plantation in Henrico, and home to the Randolph family for more than a century. They entertained George Washington, Thomas Jefferson, and the Marquis de Lafayette. Due to the industrialization of the surrounding area, in 1933 Virginia Society of The National Society of the Colonial Dames of America purchased Wilton and moved it to its current site on a bluff overlooking the James in Richmond, a few miles west of its original location.
- Chatsworth - Chatsworth Plantation was part of the extensive Randolph family property acquired by William Randolph I (1650–1711). A home was built there in 1751 by Peter Randolph (1717–1767).
- Tree Hill-Begun in the late-eighteenth century just east of Richmond as a frame two-story, sidehall-plan farmhouse, Tree Hill grew with the Selden and Roane family fortunes until by the mid-nineteenth century the original house had evolved into a double-pile, center-hall plan Creek Revival plantation seat. As it stands today, the house is an impressive two-story plantation house with early one-story wings and a modern two-story tetrastyle portico. The house commands a magnificent view of the James River bottom lands and the Richmond city skyline.

== Plantations south side of James River ==
Most of the extant plantations south of the James River are accessed by State Route 10, which runs between Suffolk and Richmond via Smithfield, Surry, and Hopewell.

The south side plantations, from east to west, include:

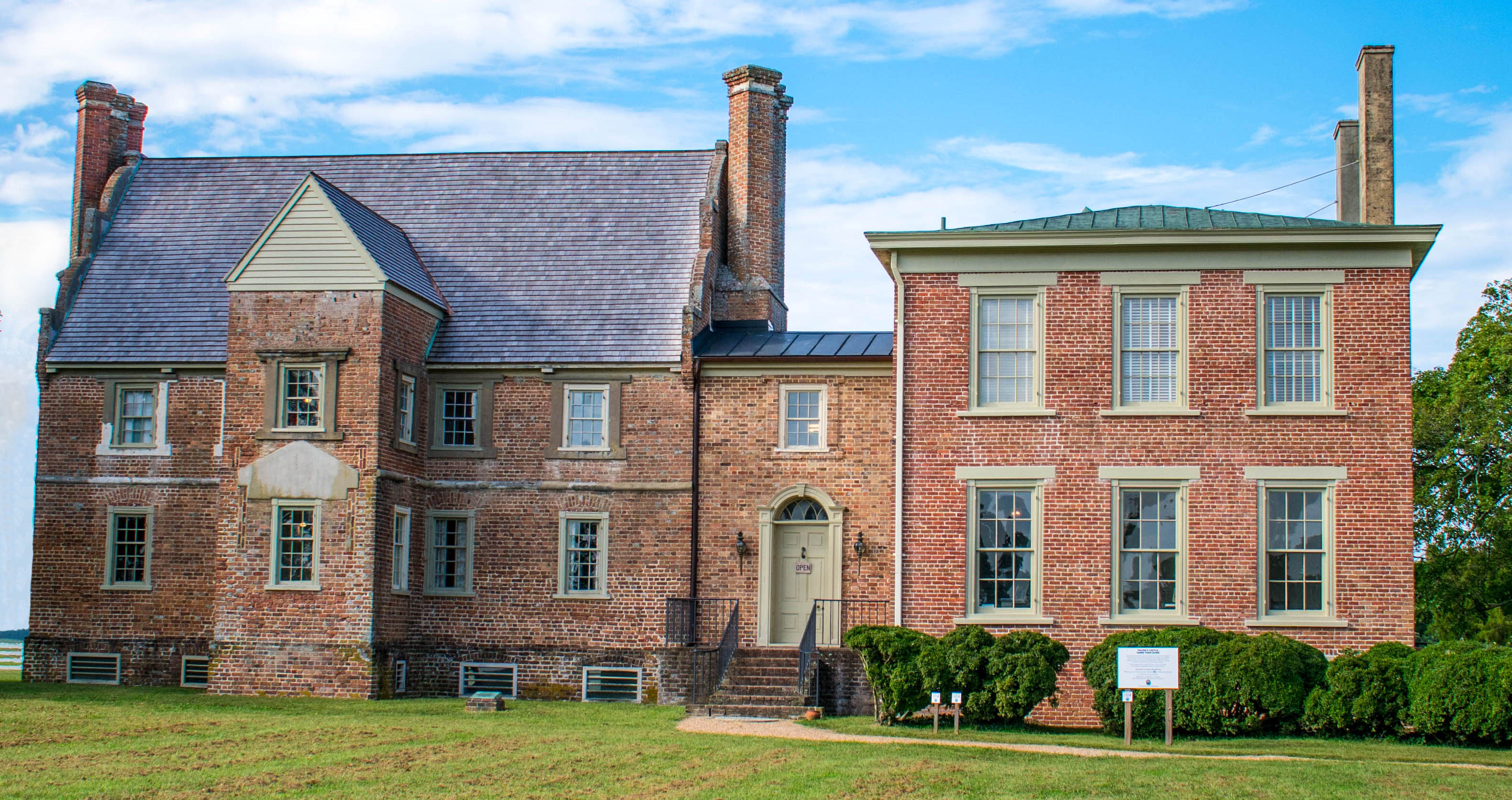
- Bacon's Castle
  Bacon's Castle also variously known as "Allen's Brick House" or the "Arthur Allen House" is located in Surry County, Virginia, USA, and is Virginia's oldest documented brick dwelling.[4] Built in 1665, it is noted as an extremely rare example of Jacobean architecture in the New World. The house became known as "Bacon's Castle" because it was occupied as a fort or "castle" by the followers of Nathaniel Bacon during Bacon's Rebellion in 1676. However, contrary to popular folklore, Bacon never lived at Bacon's Castle, nor is he even known to have ever visited it. Today Bacon's Castle is an historic house museum and historic site open for guest visitation. Bacon's Castle is an official Preservation Virginia historic site and operates under its 501 (c)(3) not-for-profit status.
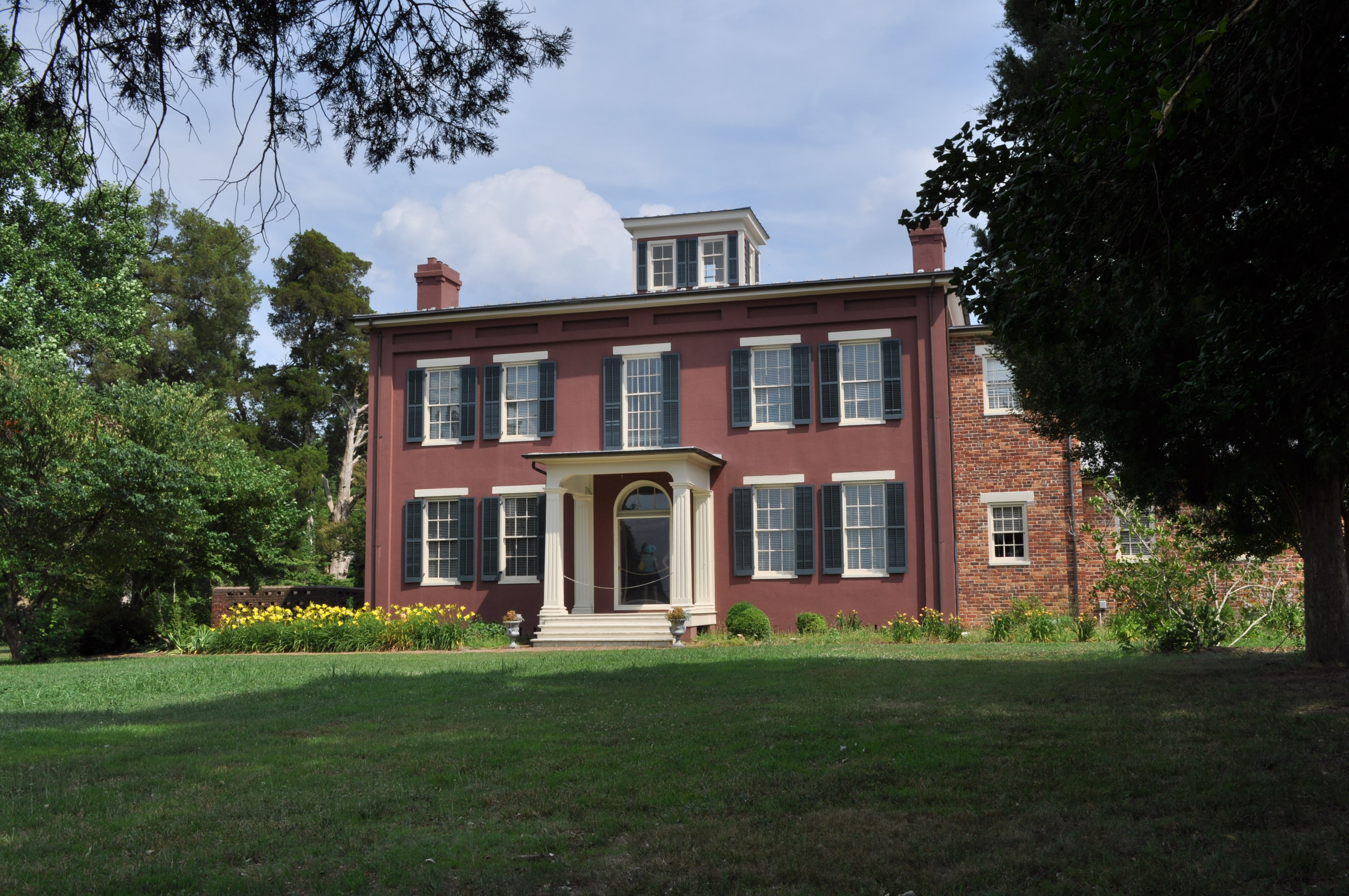
- Chippokes
  Chippokes Plantation was established in 1617 by Captain William Powell of the Jamestown Settlement in the Virginia Colony. In 1967, the 1,700-acre (6.9 km2) plantation was donated to the Commonwealth of Virginia by Mrs. Victor Stewart for use as Chippokes State Park. One of the oldest working farms in the nation, Chippokes has kept its boundaries since the 17th century. The structures and artifacts on the property reflect plantation life from the early 17th century to the present. The antebellum Chippokes Mansion and the Chippokes Farm & Forestry Museum both offer scenic tours of the estate, cultivated formal gardens and woodlands.
- Rich Neck Farm Constructed in the early nineteenth century, the house was remarkable for the number of original accessory features that survived into the 21st century. Placed on the National Register of Historic Places, May 19, 1980, Rich Neck provided a vivid impression of life on a prosperous Southside plantation in the early nineteenth century. Long connected with the Ruffins, one of the prominent families of Southside Virginia, Rich Neck possessed a collection of buildings which were among the best preserved and most noteworthy of their type in the region. Situated behind the house were a nineteenth-century smokehouse, an early and mid-nineteenth-century office; and an outhouse, well house and chicken house, all built in the twentieth century. Original sashes, most of the doors, hinges (many with their leather washers), locks, and other hardware remained. The Ruffin family figured in Virginia's social and intellectual history throughout the colonial and early national periods. Its most notable member was Edmund Ruffin, an ardent secessionist and agricultural pioneer. Research indicates Rich Neck was owned by the Ruffin family until 1865. The house long stood vacant and in a state of disrepair. In 2011 Preservation Virginia listed Rich Neck Farm as one of the most endangered historic sites in Virginia. The house was destroyed by fire in 2012.
- Pleasant Point Patented to William Edwards in 1657, Pleasant Point is the ancestral home of the Edwards family in Virginia. The 19th-century home was built between 1724 and 1765 and renovated in the 1830s and 1950s. A Confederate signal station existed on the property during the Civil War; in May, 1864, U.S. troops raided the property before continuing upriver toward Richmond, according to James Hoge Tyler, a Confederate soldier assigned to the unit who later served as governor of Virginia (1898–1902).
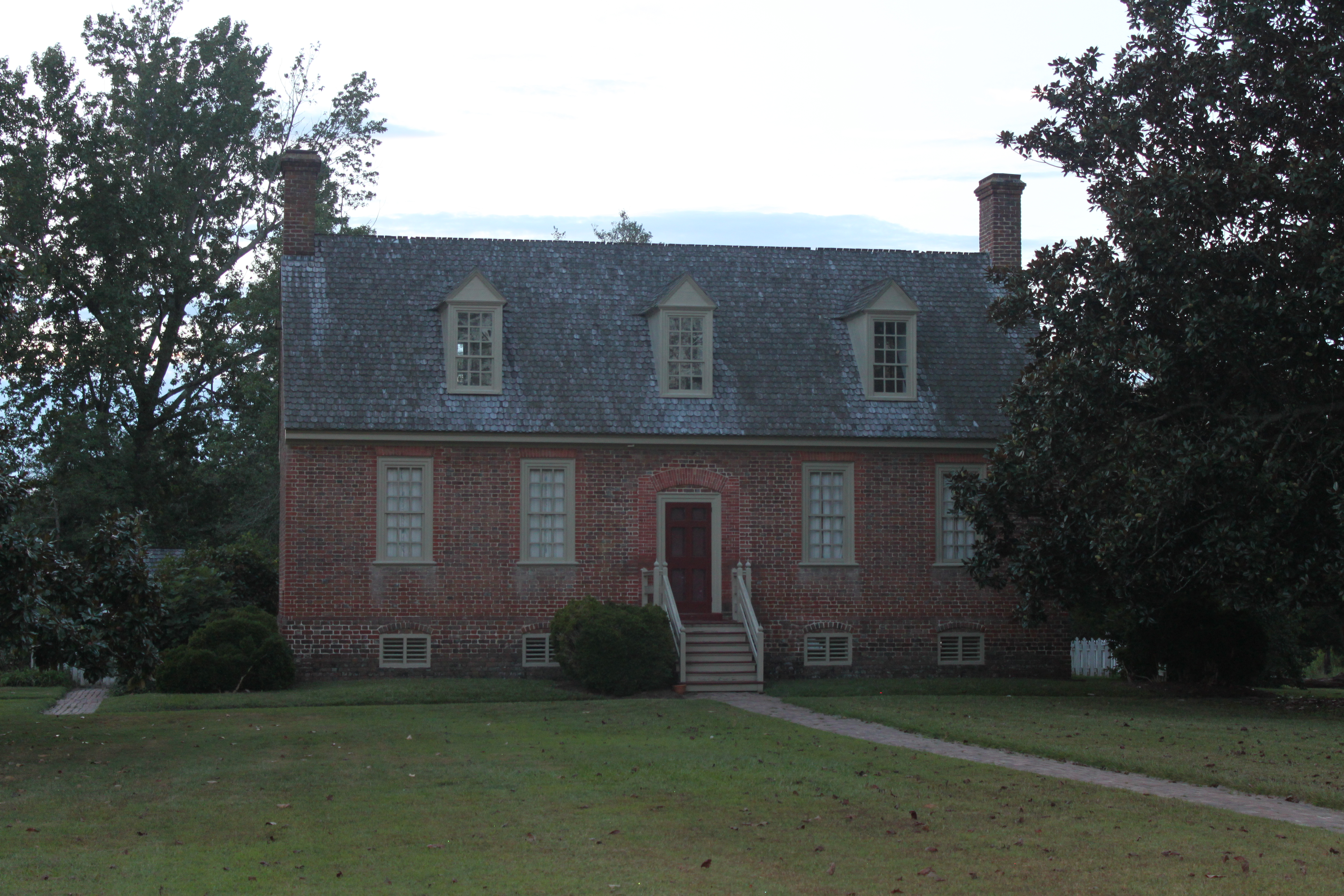
- Smith's Fort
  Smith's Fort The plantation received its name because it was the location of Captain John Smith's "New Fort," built in 1609, located directly across the James River from the Jamestown colony. The fort was quickly abandoned due to dry rot and a rat infestation.[3] The same land was later given by Chief Powhatan to John Rolfe as a dowry for the hand of Pocahontas when Rolfe and Pocahontas married. Archaeological surveys of the property have revealed that a number of structures have existed on the property and the present, restored main house was built by Jacob Faulcon in 1751.
- Swann's Point
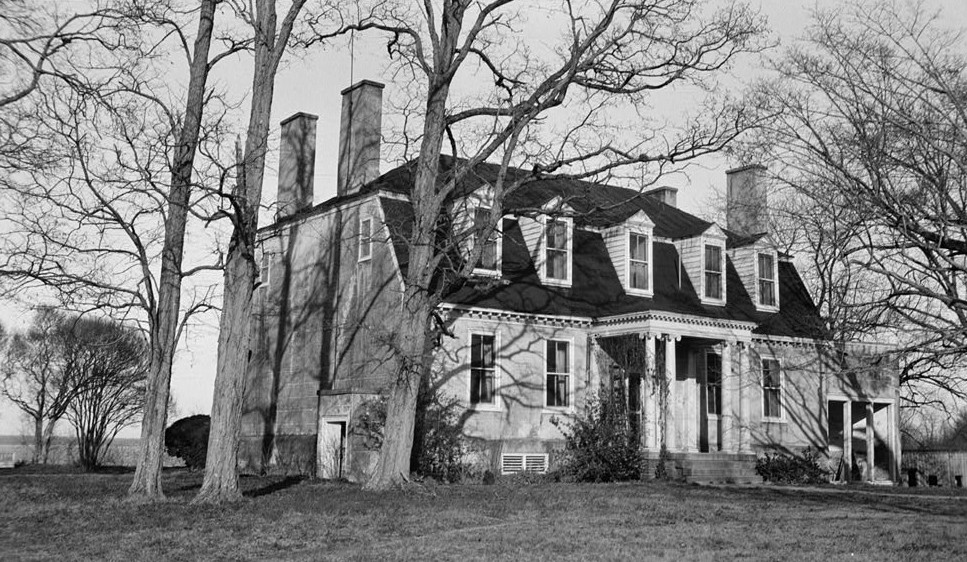
- Four Mile Tree
  Four Mile Tree A plantation near Jamestown, Virginia that once encompassed two thousand acres (8 km^{2}), it was situated on the south bank of the James River opposite Jamestown, four miles (6 km) further north. On a hill near the water's edge a handsome old house overlooks the river. This plantation, was the seat of the Browne family for two hundred years. The first owner, Colonel Henry Browne, was a member of Sir William Berkeley's Council in 1643. The manor house constructed circa 1745 remains well-preserved in its original historical state.
- Pipsico (now Pipsico Scout Reservation)
- Eastover plantation has been owned and operated by the Peninsula Baptist Association as a retreat center since 1972. The 19th-century manor house overlooking the James River has been renovated to accommodate the modern desires of guests. It can be reserved for special events such as weddings, bridal and baby showers, afternoon teas and Bed and Breakfast lodging all based on availability.
- Wakefield Plantation is the original home of the prominent Harrison family as it appears to have been the property of the first Benjamin Harrison as early as 1643. Portions of Wakefield remained in the Harrison Family until circa 1800. The present mansion at Wakefield was built in the 1940s.
- Claremont Manor Claremont Manor is located in Surry County, Virginia, on the south shore of James River at its confluence with Upper Chippokes Creek. It was in the area occupied by the Quiyoughcohannock Indians when George Harrison received a grant of 200 acres there is 1621. Arthur Allen purchased the land in 1656, and in 1754, William Allen built the manor house, naming it Claremont Manor in 1793. The name Claremont was generally thought to be in honor of the Royal Residence "Claremont" in the Shire of Surrey, England, birthplace of Queen Victoria. The plantation remained in the Allen family for over two centuries. The house survives with many alterations.
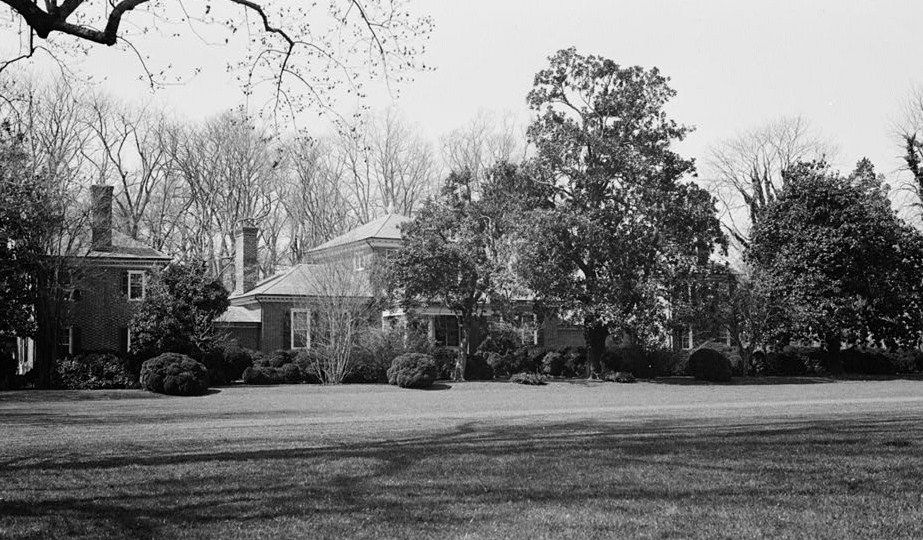
- Brandon Plantation
  Brandon Plantation is located on the south shore of the James River in Prince George County, Virginia. The 5,000-acre (20 km^{2}) plantation is a working farm and is one of the longest-running agricultural enterprises in the United States. It has an unusual brick mansion in the style of Palladio's "Roman Country House" completed in the 1760s, and was perhaps designed by Thomas Jefferson. It was established in 1616 by Captain John Martin, one of the original leaders of the Virginia Colony at Jamestown in 1607. The plantation was owned by the Harrison family from 1700 to 1926 when the estate was purchased and restored by Robert Williams Daniel. Brandon is a National Historical Landmark and although it is a private residence, the house and gardens are open for tours.
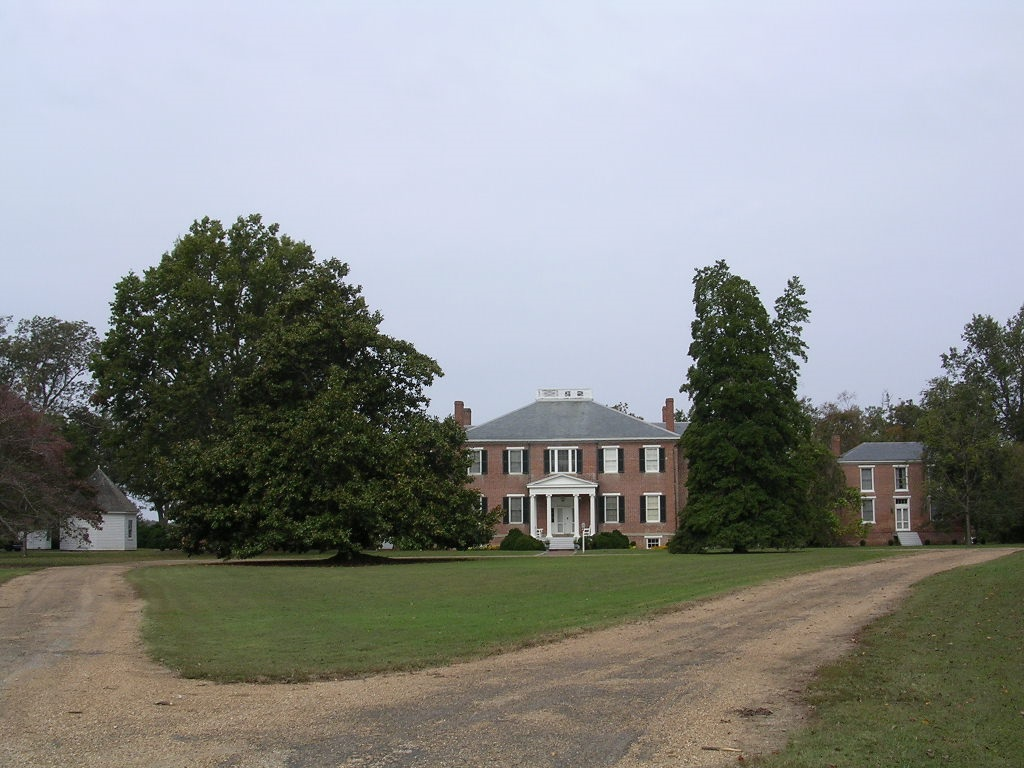
- Upper Brandon Plantation
  Upper Brandon Plantation - This was part of an original land patent known as Brandon, granted to Captain John Martin, one of the founders of Jamestown. William Byrd Harrison inherited the upper 3,555 acres (14.39 km^{2}) of Brandon, which became Upper Brandon. He built a large brick manor house in 1825 and developed the farm into a model of modern agricultural management. It remained in the Harrison family until 1948. In 1985, a Richmond-based corporation purchased the property, and restored and furnished the long-vacant manor house for use as a corporate retreat. Upper Brandon is a privately owned working farm.
- Edloe - This important five-bay wood-frame plantation house overlooks the James River just west of Upper Brandon. Matthew Edloe I arrived in Virginia in 1618 aboard the Neptune, Lord Delaware's ship, and 1637 his son and heir Matthew Edloe II patented 1,200 acres in Charles City County, Virginia. Prince George County was formed from the portion of Charles City located south of the James River in 1703. The date of construction of the house at Edloe is unknown because the property records of Prince George County were destroyed during the American Civil War. The five-bay clapboard house was insured by John Edloe in 1805 and 1810, and old beams uncovered during 20th-century renovations to the house indicate that it almost certainly dates to the 18th century. The book Sketches of Slave Life: Or, Illustrations of the "Peculiar Institution" by Peter Randolph published in 1855 describes Randolph's live as a slave on Edloe Plantation prior to the Civil War. Edloe is a privately owned working farm in the 21st century.
- Dunmore
- Willow Hill - This 700-acre plantation overlooking the James River at the mouth of Wards Creek, was an original grant to Col. John Ward in the 17th century. The original house burned in the 1840s and was rebuilt on the same foundation. The brick facade was added in the 1940s by Mrs. Cocke.
- Bonnacord - Captain David Peebles of Fife County, Scotland, a Royalist, escaped to Virginia circa 1649 during the Cromwell Rebellion, leaving his wife and their young children in Fife. In 1650 he patented 833 acres on the south bank of the James River in Charles City County (later Prince George) Southeast of Old River Road (now Rte 10) and Powell's Creek. David Peebles called his plantation ‘Bon Accord,’ and died there prior to September 1, 1659. Through marriage and inheritance the Bon Accord estate passed through the Poythress family to the Cocke Family.
- Aberdeen is a historic plantation house located several miles north of Disputanta, in Prince George County, Virginia. It was built about 1810, and is a two-story, temple form brick dwelling. Unlike most of the James River Plantations Aberdeen was built back from the River along the old river road (now Rte 10). It features a pedimented gable roof and a diminutive entrance portico supported by Doric order columns. It was listed on the National Register of Historic Places in 2002.
- Flowerdew Hundred dates to 1618–19 with the patent of 1,000 acres (4.0 km^{2}) on the south side of the James River in Virginia. Sir George Yeardley, the Governor and Captain General of the Virginia Colony, may have named the property after his wife, Temperance Flowerdew. Their primary residence was in Jamestown when Sir George called the first General Assembly in Jamestown in 1620. With a population of about 30, the plantation was economically successful with thousands of pounds of tobacco produced along with corn, fish and livestock. Sir George paid 120 pounds (possibly a hogshead of tobacco) to build the first windmill in British America. The plantation was purchased in the 1960s by David A. Harrison, III, a member of the prominent Harrison family. He permitted extensive archaeological digs to be conducted on the property. The artifacts collected during these digs were donated to the University of Virginia. Today, Flowerdew Hundred plantation is a private residence.
- Hatches
- Maycock Plantation, also known as Maycox and Maycock's Plantation, (now incorporated into the James River National Wildlife Refuge)
- Greenway is located on the south side of Rt 10 east of Hopewell. The residence was built ca. 1800 and is among the oldest houses still standing in Prince George County. The house, built over an English basement, is a typical wood frame, hall and parlor, farm house with gabled dormers and large end chimneys. Many of the windows have the original blown glass. Greenway is a private residence and is currently operated as an American Saddlebred horse farm.
- Beechwood Plantation (home of Edmund Ruffin and site of the Beefsteak Raid) Built in the 1850s by Edmund Ruffin for his son Edmund Ruffin, Jr., the house is a large, two-story, wood frame, mansion built in the Greek Revival style, sided with plain weatherboards set on a full raised brick basement with, interior chimneys, floor to ceiling windows and a low, hipped tin roof. Long vacant and open to the elements, Beechwood stands in a state of ruin as of 2011.
- Tar Bay One of only a few brick homes built on the south bank of the James during the colonial period, the Tar Bay mansion was a high style Georgian plantation house built in 1746 by Daniel Colley on a bluff overlooking a broad reach of the James just west of Coggins Point known as Tar Bay. The house was a two-story five-bay, hip-roofed brick structure over a full English basement. Its brickwork was laid in Flemish bond with gauged brick jack arches. It was somewhat unusual due to an extension from the river front that gave the house a T-shaped floor plan. The chimneys had exterior fireplace openings, that were bricked up at the time of construction. These were apparently for future additions to either side of the house that were planned, but never built. The plantation remained in the Colley family through the early 19th century when the estate passed by marriage and inheritance through the Cocke family to descendants of Edmund Ruffin. The mansion was being used as a summer home by the Ruffin family when it was gutted by fire in the mid-1960s. Its ruins still stand (2013) nearly forgotten in the woods above the James.
- Bouvier Castle
- Jordan's Journey
- Evergreen Plantation (birthplace of Edmund Ruffin)
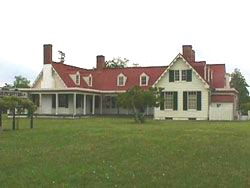
- Appomattox
  Appomattox Plantation is a plantation house located (at City Point) in Hopewell, Virginia, USA. It is best known as the Union headquarters during the Siege of Petersburg in 1864–65. The restored manor house on a bluff overlooking the confluence of the James River and Appomattox River, and the grounds are managed by the National Park Service. The museum there, Grant's Headquarters at City Point Museum, is a unit of the Petersburg National Battlefield Park.
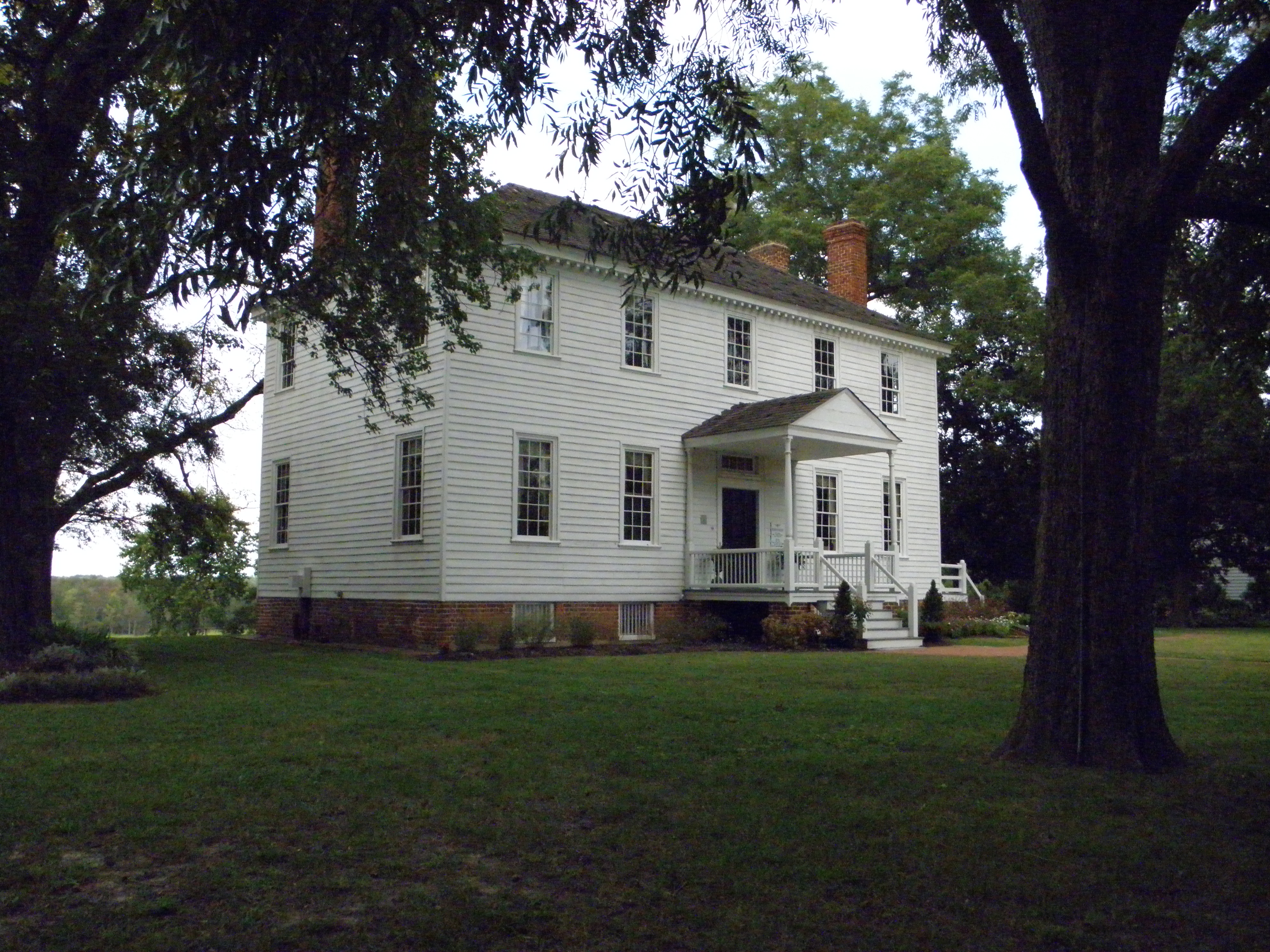
- Weston Manor
  Weston Manor is a large five-bay, wood-frame, plantation house built in 1789 for William and Christian Eppes Gilliam on land in Prince George County acquired from her cousin John Wayles Eppes as a wedding gift. The Gilliam family arrived in Virginia in the 17th century as indentured servants. By the late 18th century the family had amassed several plantations in the area. Christian was the daughter of Richard Eppes of Appomattox Plantation. Her maternal grandfather was a descendant of Pocahontas, as were many members of the First Families of Virginia. It is noted for its period interior, and is open for tours from April 1 through October 31 each year. Hours are Monday through Saturday 10am - 4:30pm, Sunday 1pm - 4:30pm.
- Presquile Plantation In 1780, David Meade Randolph married a cousin Mary Randolph and they settled in Chesterfield County near Bermuda Hundred at Presquile, a plantation just west of the Appomattox River that was part of the Randolph family's extensive property along the James River. While David Randolph saw to the cultivation of his plantation, gaining a reputation as "the best farmer in the country," as well as a noted inventor, Mary assumed a conventional role, supervising the household, entertaining their many guests and acquiring a reputation as a lively hostess who set an exquisite table. While living at Presquile, Mary bore four sons. Over time, life at Presquile, situated along the swamp lands of the lower James River, proved difficult. According to a contemporary source, the swamps produced noxious fumes that brought on "frequent and dangerous diseases. Mr. Randolph is himself very sickly, and his young and amiable wife has not enjoyed one month of good health since she first came to live on this plantation." By 1798, the family had moved to Richmond, where they built a mansion, christened "Moldavia" (a combination of their two given names) by a friend. Presquile was sold out of the Randolph family three years later. Part of the plantation is now the Presquile National Wildlife Refuge
- Mont Blanco also known as Mount Blanco was a plantation set on a high bluff overlooking the James River in Chesterfield County, Virginia. The manor house was a two-story, wood-frame, side-hall farmhouse, with an ell built in the last decade of the eighteenth century for John Wayles Eppes, a United States representative and Senator from Virginia and son-in-law of U.S. President Thomas Jefferson. The name of the Plantation is said to have been suggested by Eppes's father-in-law Thomas Jefferson, due to the height of the bluff and the expansive views across the broad river valley below. (Mont Blanc, in the Alps, is the highest mountain in Western Europe.) During the American Civil War, the plantation was plundered by Union soldiers of the Army of the James under General Benjamin Franklin Butler, who occupied the area during the Bermuda Hundred Campaign. In 1948 Mount Blanco, then operated as a dairy farm known as Wood's Dairy, was acquired by Francis Gibbons Sloan, grandfather of University of Kentucky offensive coordinator Joe Sloan. The 18th century house at Mount Blanco was destroyed by fire in the mid-1950s and was replaced by a modern home. In the first decade of the 21st century, the agricultural operation was discontinued, and the land was developed as a residential subdivision.
- Meadowville, originally part of Sir Thomas Dale's settlement in 1613. It was first called Rochdale Hundred and afterwards 'Neck of Land in Charles City', to distinguish it from 'Neck of Land in James City' and later became known as Jones Neck. By 1681 the land had been acquired by William Byrd who sold 507 acres to Richard Kennon, who gave the property to his daughter Judith who married Thomas Eldridge. The Jones Neck property was later divided and the western portion became known as Rochedale and the eastern 207 acre parcel became known as Meadowville. In 1926 a canal known as the Jones Neck cutoff was dug across property which shortened distance by water to Richmond by 4.5 miles. The portion that was separated became known as Meadowville Island. The property remained devoted to agriculture until the early 21st century when it was sold for the development of Meadowville Landing, a high end residential community.
- Rochedale Hundred, was originally part of Sir Thomas Dale's settlement in 1613. It was first called Rochdale Hundred and afterwards 'Neck of Land in Charles City', to distinguish it from 'Neck of Land in James City' and later became known as Jones Neck. By 1681 the land had been acquired by William Byrd who sold 507 acres to Richard Kennon, who gave the property to his daughter Judith who married Thomas Eldridge. The Jones Neck property was later divided and the western portion became known as Rochedale and the eastern parcel became known as Meadowville. In the mid-20th century the western 300 acres known as Rochedale Farm was acquired by a Southern States Cooperative executive and remained devoted to agriculture until the late 1980s when it was sold for the development of River's Bend on the James, a high end executive community. In 1990 the Varina-Enon Bridge that carries Interstate 295 (Virginia) across the James River opened just east of Rochedale.
- Kingsland (owned by Christopher Branch at Henricus)
- Spring Hill is a 1 1/2-story, double-pile, side-hall, wood-frame plantation house. The house is clad with beaded clapboards and rests upon a brick foundation laid in a Flemish bonc. It is covered with a gabled roof pierced by two dormers on each slope. It has a pair of brick chimneys on the west wall, opposite the interior passage. Dendrochronological analysis has shown that the original structure was built in the summer of 1767 or shortly thereafter. The house stands in a state of ruin in the woods just west of the Dutch Gap power station.
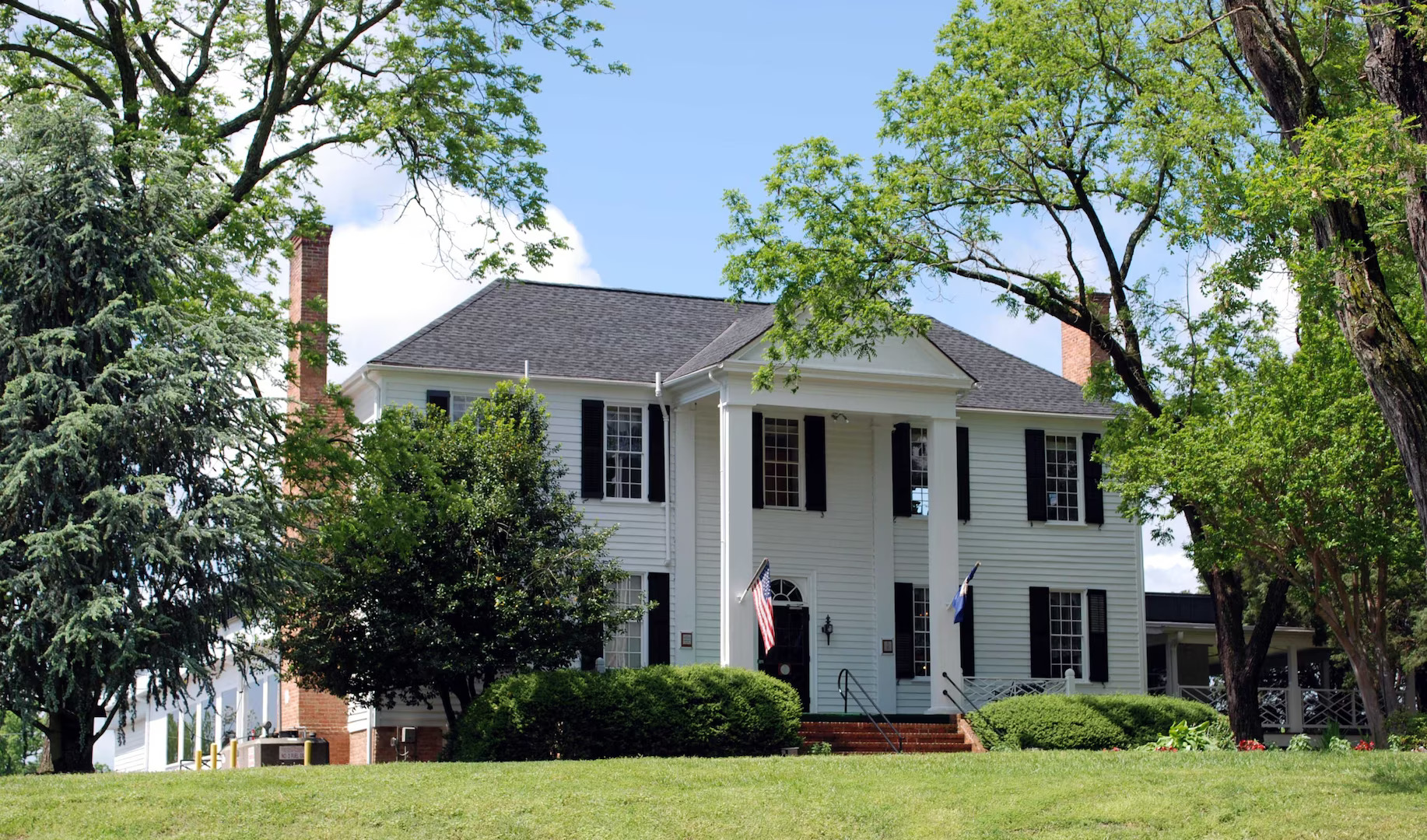
- Bellwood Manor
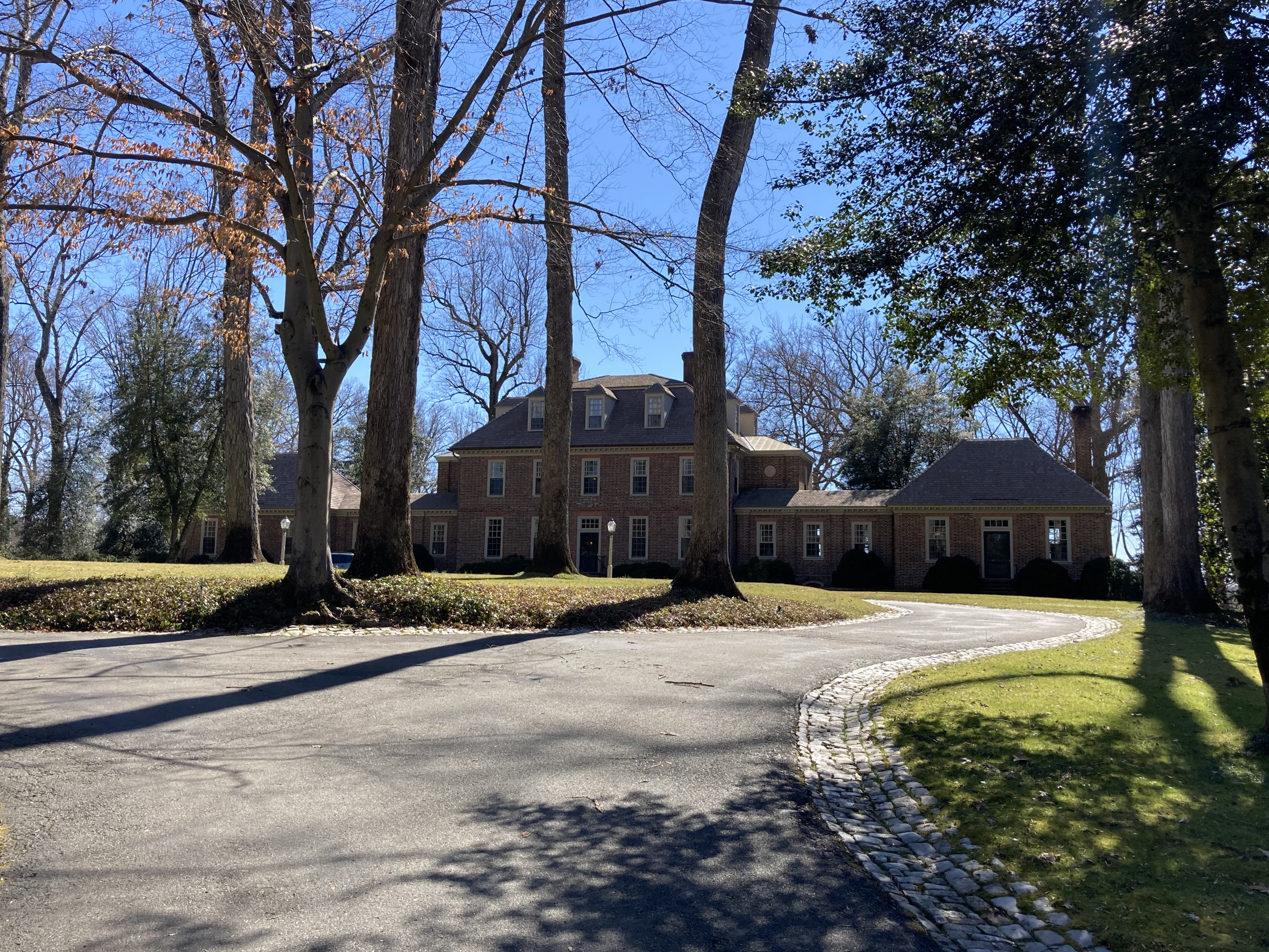
  Amphill
  Bellwood is a historic plantation house, that has also been known as Sheffield, Auburn Chase, and New Oxford. Bellwood was built on Sheffield, a plantation owned by the Seth Ward family since the mid-17th century. Judge Richard Ward, son of the original Seth Ward immigrant, acquired Sheffield in 1665 and five subsequent generations of first born sons named Seth were born and raised at Sheffield. In 1797 Seth Ward V sold the property to his aunt and uncle, Mary Ward and Richard Claiborne Gregory who built Bellwood about 1804, as the manor house on the large Sheffield plantation that is the site of the present-day Defense Supply Center, Richmond. When the U.S. Army purchased the property in 1941 from the estate of James Bellwood the manor house was turned into an officers' club. The structure, although renovated and adapted for use by the military, still retains much of its original architecture, including its original pine flooring, paneled doors, stairs, ornamental locks and doorknobs, and window frames. The Bellwood Club is on the National Register of Historic Places and is a registered historic landmark in both Virginia and Chesterfield County.
- Ampthill (Chesterfield County, Virginia) Ampthill Plantation was located on the south bank of the James River about four miles south of the head of navigation at modern-day Richmond, Virginia. Built by Henry Cary, Jr. about 1730, it was just upstream of Falling Creek. It was later owned by Colonel Archibald Cary, who maintained a flour mill complex and iron forge at the nearby town of Warwick. Mary Randolph was born there in 1762. In 1929 the manor house at Ampthill was dismantled and moved to a site on Cary Street Road in the West end of Richmond where it still stands today. The former plantation property is now occupied by a DuPont plant.
