= North Bend Plantation =

Historic house in Virginia, United States

- North Bend
- U.S. National Register of Historic Places
- Virginia Landmarks Register
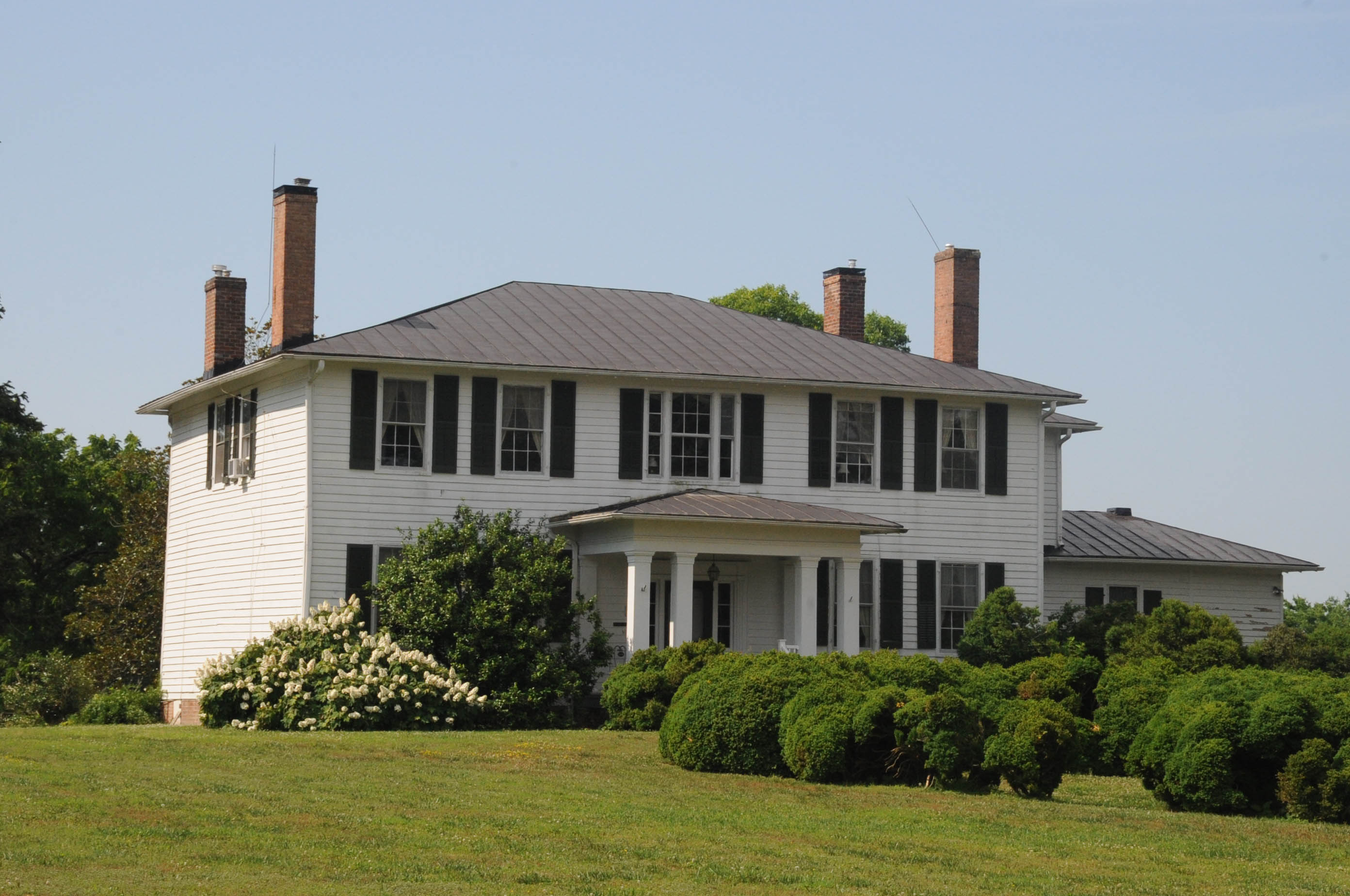

- Location within Virginia Location within the United States
- Nearest city: Weyanoke, Virginia
- Coordinates: 37°18′42″N 77°3′21″W
- Built: 1855
- Architectural style: Greek Revival
- NRHP reference No.: 89001107
- VLR No.: 018-0065

Significant dates
- Added to NRHP: August 21, 1989
- Designated VLR: July 21, 1987

North Bend Plantation is an estate located on the north bank of the James River in Charles City County, Virginia. It is located along State Route 5, a scenic byway which runs between the independent cities of Richmond and Williamsburg.

== History ==
The North Bend Plantation site was first inhabited by the Weanoc Indians. The original portion of the present house was built in 1819 by John Minge. In 1853 the home was doubled in size by Thomas Hamlin Willcox. Architectural detailing from the expansion included Greek Revival detailing reminiscent of the designs of builder/architect Asher Benjamin. In 1864 North Bend served as the headquarters of Major General Philip Sheridan as 30,000 Union Army troops prepared to cross the James River on a pontoon bridge during the Overland Campaign. The home has been in the Copland family since 1916.

North Bend was added to the National Register of Historic Places in 1989.

== Visitors ==
The grounds are open daily from 9:00 a.m. to 5:00 p.m. daily and guided tours of the house are available daily by appointment.

== See also ==
- List of James River plantations
