= Robert Stacy =

Virginia colonist and burgess

Robert Stacy (also spelled "Stacie") was a colonist and politician in the Colony of Virginia who briefly served as one of the 22 members of the first assembly of the Virginia House of Burgesses in 1619.

== Biography ==
On July 30, 1619, the Virginia House of Burgesses was convened as the first representative legislature in the Americas for a six-day meeting at the new timber church on Jamestown Island, Virginia. The legislative body was composed of the Governor, Council of State appointed by the Virginia Company, and 22 locally elected representatives, including Stacy.

Stacy was selected to be one of the assembly members to represent the constituency of Martin's Brandon (Captain John Martin's Plantation) in what is present-day Prince George County, Virginia. Stacy was denied his seat in the assembly, however, because Governor Sir George Yeardley learned that Martin refused to give up a clause in his land patent that exempted his land from England's laws and from any laws passed by the General Assembly.

== See also ==
- House of Burgesses
- List of James River plantations
