= Matthew Jones House =

Historic house in Virginia, United States

- U.S. National Register of Historic Places
- Virginia Landmarks Register
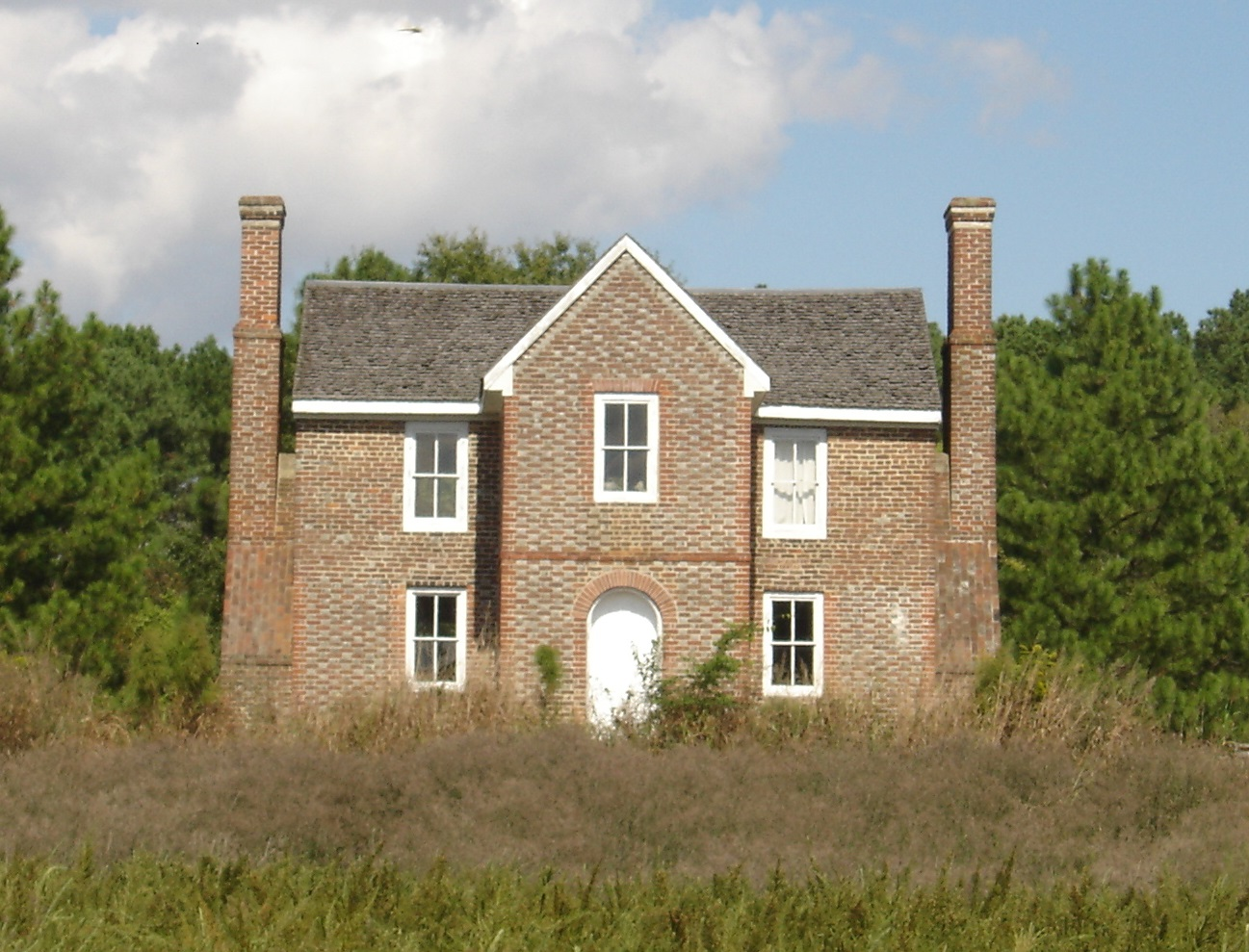
- The Matthew Jones House in 2014

- Location within Virginia Location within the United States
- Location: Taylor Ave. and Harrison Rd., Fort Eustis, Newport News, Virginia
- Coordinates: 37°9′37″N 76°36′11″W
- Area: 0 acres (0 ha)
- Built: 1727
- NRHP reference No.: 69000342
- VLR No.: 121-0006

Significant dates
- Added to NRHP: June 11, 1969
- Designated VLR: November 5, 1968

The Matthew Jones House is a historic plantation house located on Fort Eustis in Newport News, Virginia. The house sits on a hill toward the northern end of Mulberry Island, overlooking the James River. It was built ca. 1725 as a one-and-a-half-story frame dwelling with brick chimneys and later underwent two major renovations. During the first renovation, in 1730, the walls were bricked in and a shed room and porch tower were added. During the second, in 1893, the house was raised to a full two stories. In 1918 the house and its surrounding land were acquired by the U.S. government for the establishment of an army post. By the late twentieth century, the Matthew Jones House had fallen into grave disrepair. In 1993 it was preserved and rehabilitated by the National Park Service in cooperation with the U.S. Army Corps of Engineers. Today it serves as an architectural museum.

At times in the past the Matthew Jones House was also known as the "Brick House" for its construction, and the nearby creek, now known as Milstead Creek, was once called Brick House Creek. It is frequently stated in popular histories of the area and on the Matthew Jones House roadside historical marker that the plantation was once known as "Bourbon".

== Period I (ca. 1725) ==
The Matthew Jones House, named after its original owner, was built around 1725 as a 1 1/2-story frame house with brick chimneys. The house in its earliest form was earthfast – rather than the house standing on a foundation, its main structural posts extended into the ground. The original form of the house was a two-room hall and parlor style dwelling, with the hall serving as a multipurpose living and working room and the parlor, or chamber, used for sleeping and private dining.

An exterior brick kitchen was built in 1727.

== Period II (1730) ==
Matthew Jones died in 1728 and left his house to his son Scervant, who was a minor at the time. Scervant's guardian, John Jones, embarked on improvements to the house which had probably been planned by Matthew before his death. The exterior walls of the house were rebuilt in brick, though several beams from the earlier framing were retained as part of the roof framing and have survived to this day. The house also acquired a cellar at this time and was no longer earthfast, but rather had a brick foundation. The foundation was laid in English bond, while brickwork in the rest of the house was laid using Flemish bond. Several decorative elements are present in the brickwork: the headers of the bricks are glazed, and rubbed bricks were used around the windows and at the corners of the building.

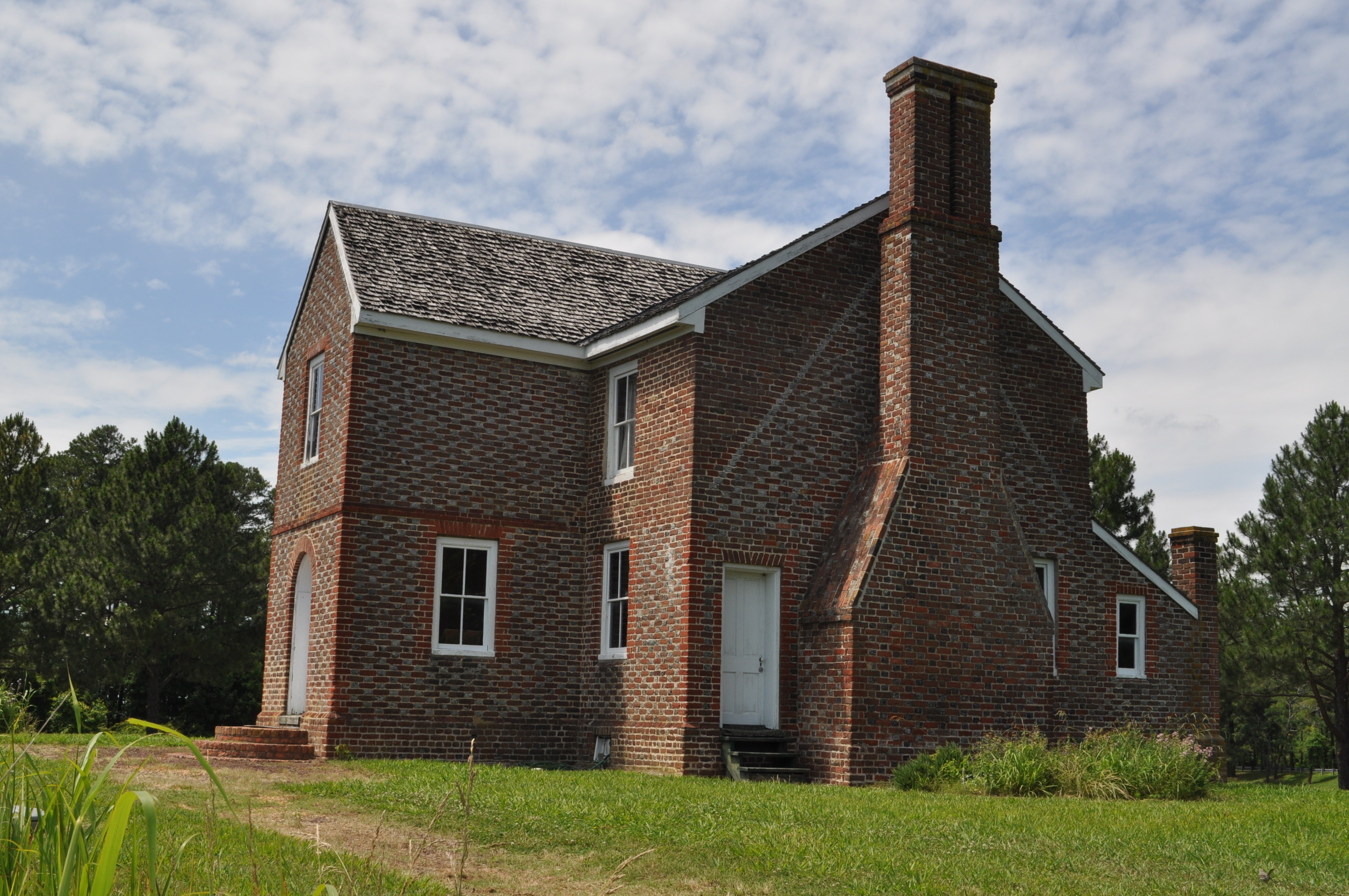
Southeast elevation of the Matthew Jones House, showing the Period II porch tower and shed room additions.

Two additions were made to the house at this time: a shed room at the back of the building and a two-story porch tower at the front. The shed room provided additional sleeping or storage space, while the new tower entry provided a measure of control over who had access to the interior, private spaces of the house. In the second quarter of the eighteenth century, central passages were becoming commonly used for this purpose. The Joneses likely built the porch tower, a more old-fashioned architectural feature, rather than a central passage because there was not enough space within the existing plan of the house to insert a passage without making the size of the rooms to either side inconveniently small.

Dendrochronological testing of several of the timbers from this period of renovation revealed that the trees used were felled in 1729 and were used soon after they were cut down, probably in 1730.

== Period III (1893) ==
The Matthew Jones House underwent extensive remodeling in 1893. At that time the exterior kitchen was demolished and its bricks used to raise the house to a full two stories. Bricks with the inscription "Matthew Jones 1727," which had formerly been part of the kitchen, were placed on the façade at the base of the new second story. In contrast with the original brickwork, the bricks of the new addition were laid in seven-course American bond. The outline of the original roof is still visible at each end of the building, more steeply pitched than the current roof. To accommodate the new, higher roofline, the original chimneys were heightened by adding twin stacks to the top of each. The windows were replaced, and a second door was cut into the east wall of the house, which eventually led to a frame addition which was built sometime between 1893 and the 1910s. This addition was present when photographs were taken in the 1930s but has since been demolished.

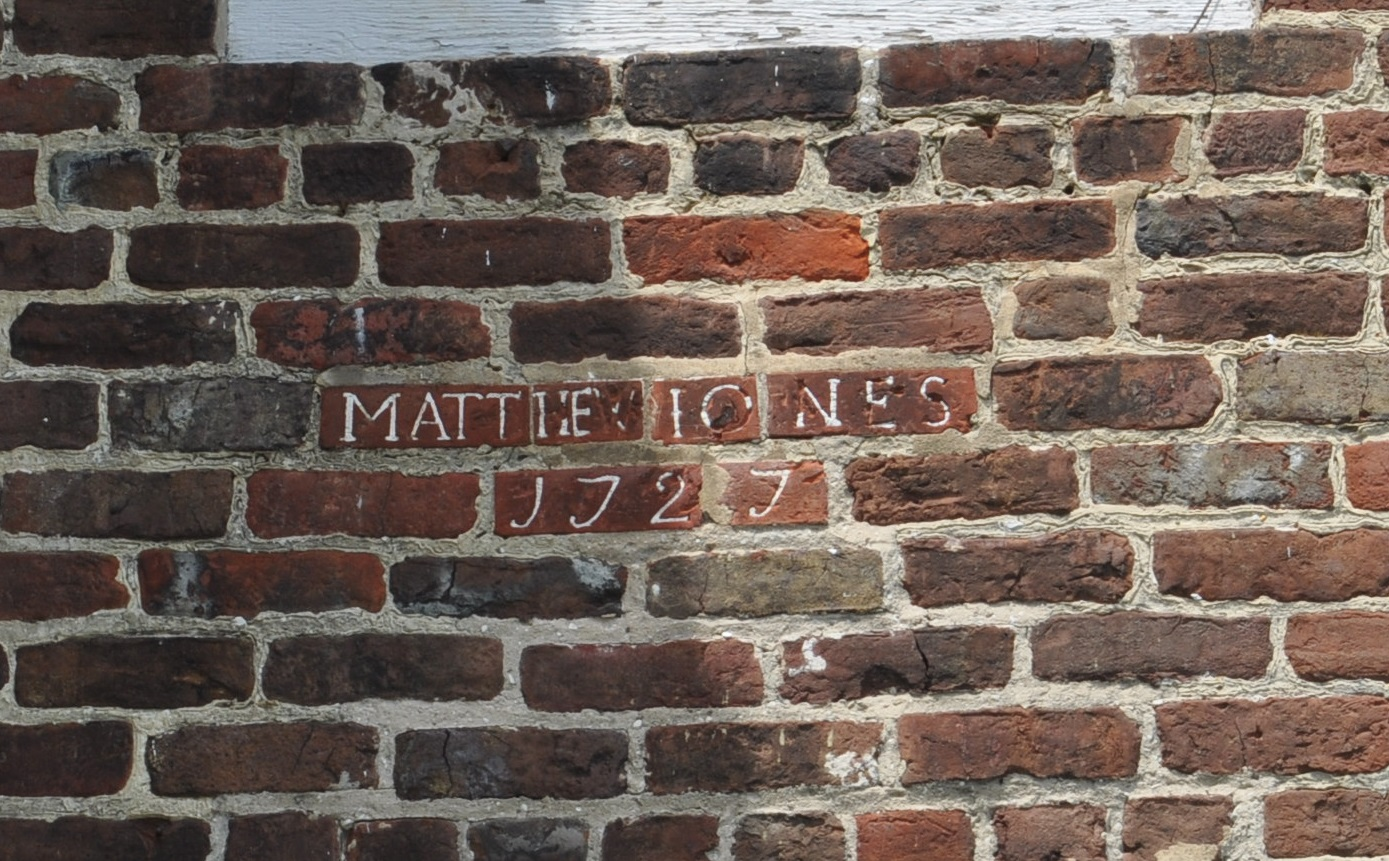
"Matthew Jones 1727" inscription on the front of the house.

In 1918 the U.S. government purchased Mulberry Island and the surrounding land in order to establish an army post known as Camp Eustis, now Fort Eustis. The Matthew Jones House was among the properties acquired at this time. The Army used the building as post housing for several decades. After World War II, the house was abandoned and sat vacant for years.

In 1940, a project to measure and record the Matthew Jones House was undertaken as part of the Historic American Buildings Survey (HABS). Drawings of all four elevations and floor plans of the first and second floors and of the cellar were produced, and ten photographs of the exterior were taken. A HABS inventory form was completed in 1959. In April 1969 the house was declared a Virginia Historic Landmark, and in June of the same year it was placed on the National Register of Historic Places.

== Period IV (1993 - ) ==
By the late twentieth century, the house was noticeably deteriorating. Members of the Fort Eustis Historical and Archaeological Association took notice and urged the Army to take steps to preserve it. In 1993, personnel from the National Park Service's Williamsport Preservation Training Center (WPTC), using funding provided by the Norfolk office of the U.S. Army Corps of Engineers, undertook a project to halt the decline of the house. The primary objective of this project was the stabilization and preservation of the building, with a secondary goal of providing the opportunity for visitors to see the building techniques that were used in the past.

The exterior of the house was restored to its Period III appearance.

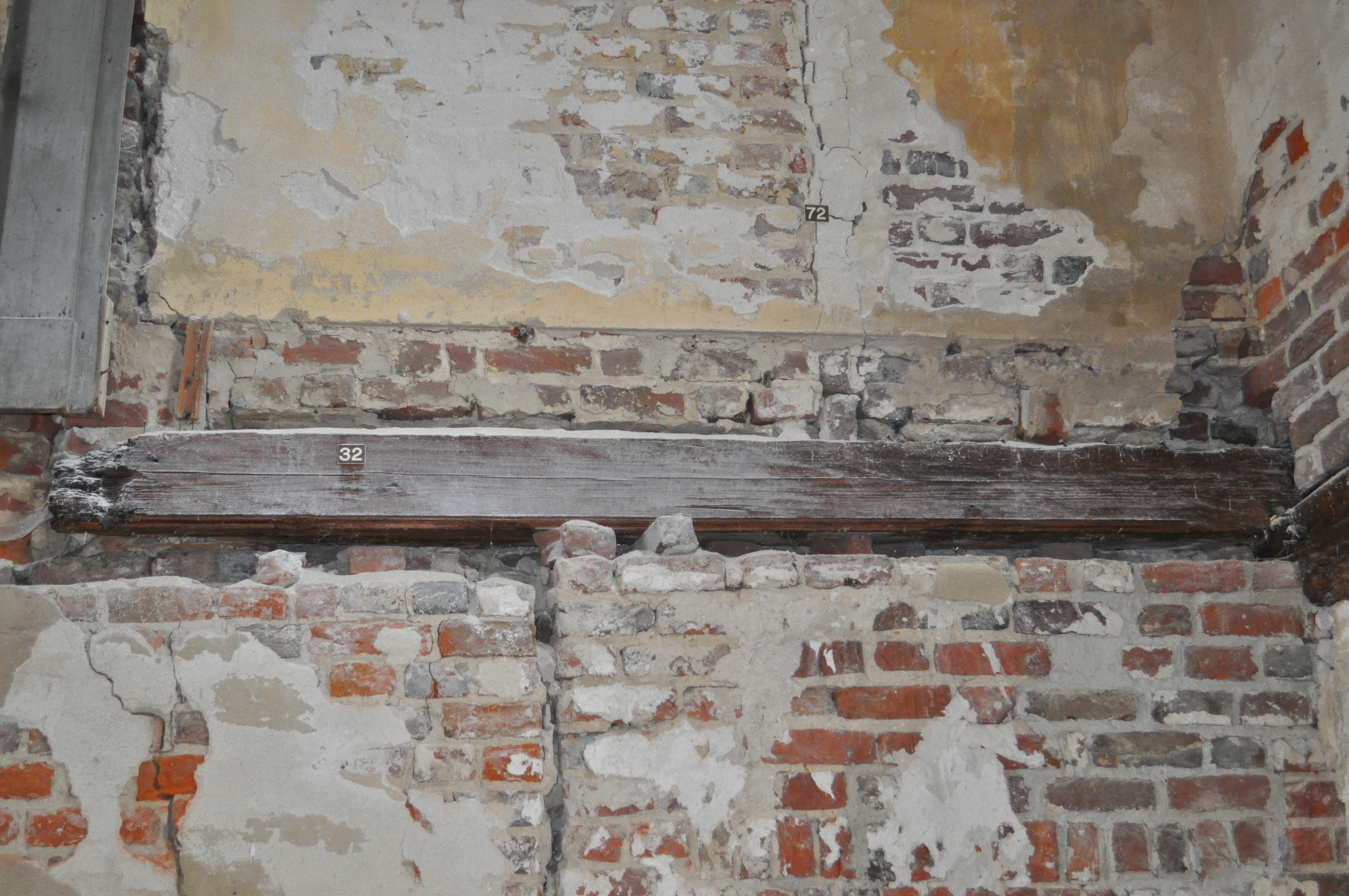
Interior view of the Matthew Jones House, showing an exposed Period I beam

In order to facilitate the second objective, it was decided to leave the interior of the building in a state of "semi-ruin," with architectural elements exposed. All Period I and II elements were left intact, while Period III elements were repaired if possible or replaced, and twentieth-century features were removed.

Today the house is managed by the Fort Eustis Cultural Resources program.
