= Pampatike =

Farm along the Pamunkey River

Coordinates: 37.701069°N 77.109790°W

Pampatike is a farm that lies along the Pamunkey River approximately two miles (3 km) southeast of the intersection of Rt. 360 and the Pamunkey River in King William County, Virginia.

The Island Field is a field in Pampatike Farm that is surrounded by dense swamps. It was an Indian village called Cattachiptico and was drawn on John Smith of Jamestowns Map of the new world in 1609. It was then transformed by Powhatan's brother, Opechancanough, into a secret island fortress where he launched both the Massacres of 1622 and 1644. Newly identified documents show the possibility that it was the location where John Smith grabbed Opechancanough by the hair and put a pistol to his head in order to escape an ambush.

In the 17th century through the mid-18th century, it was the location of tribe of Powhatan Confederacy called the Manskin Indians, a sister tribe of the Pamunkey Indians. The Manskin Indians appear in no lists current of the Powhatan Confederacy even though they appear in almost all early maps of the period. They were accidentally erased from history by early historians when their name got confused with the Manakin Indians just up river.

It was sold by the Pamunkey Indian Queen and by 1744 it became part of King Carter's family empire. By the early 19th century, Hill Carter lived at Shirley Plantation and his brother, Thomas N. Carter lived at Pampatike. In 1820 and 30s both Hill and Thomas Carter experimented with an almost forgotten farming technology called land reclamation where the swamps were diked and corn and wheat was grown. This was a massive transformation of the land where over 500 acres (2.0 km^{2}) of land were reclaimed. The swamps were diked and all creeks on the property were re-routed to reduce water and the newly made fields were called "blacklands" or "meadows." The dikes were abandoned after the Civil war and the land returned to natural swamps.

During the Civil War Union forces camped on the property where Thomas H. Carter (Colonel) was often visited by his first cousin General Robert E. Lee.

The house was burned at about 1900 and was rebuilt a few years later and is now Pampatike Organic Farm which raises vegetables, herbs, flowers, free-ranging chickens for eggs, other free-ranging poultry (guineas, peafowl, Royal Palm turkey), and purebred Nubian dairy goats using organic farming practices for all.

The swamp and fields of the farm are owned by Frank Townsend (died, April 17, 2018) and Harrison Ruffin Tyler, and are used for corn, bean and wheat farming. Harrison Ruffin Tyler is the grandson of President John Tyler and also owns Sherwood Forest Plantation and Fort Pocahontas.

== Sources ==
- Files of the Virginia Historical Society (Richmond, VA)
- Handbook of American Indians North of Mexico V. 2/4 - Page 931
- R. E. Lee: A Biography by Douglas Southall Freeman
- Map of New World by John Smith 1609
