= Lyon Gardiner Tyler =

American educator (1853–1935)

Lyon Gardiner Tyler Sr.
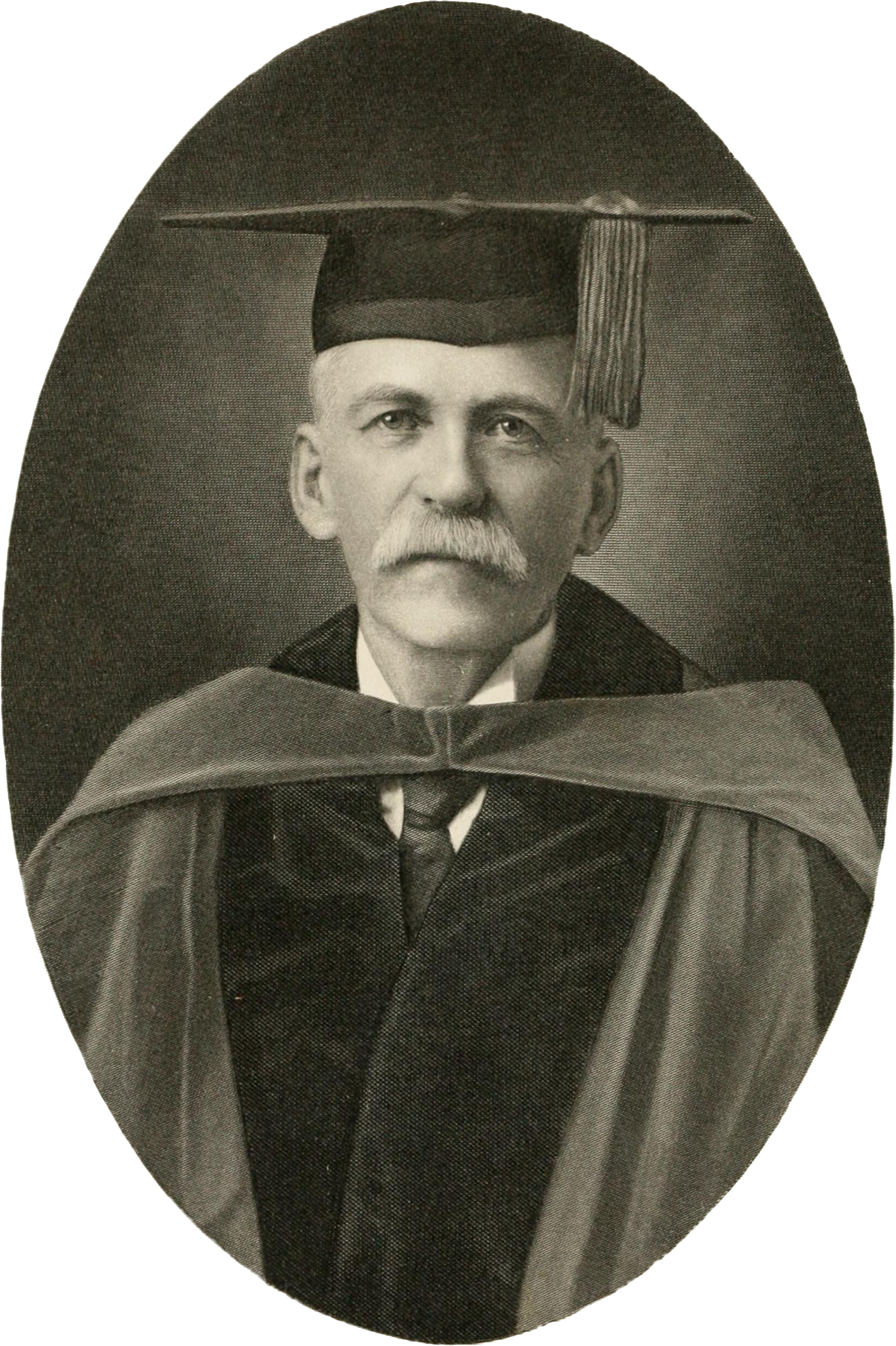
- Tyler circa 1915

17th President of the College of William & Mary
- In office 1888–1919
- Preceded by: Benjamin Stoddert Ewell
- Succeeded by: J. A. C. Chandler

Member of the Virginia House of Delegates for Richmond City
- In office December 8, 1887 – December 3, 1889 Serving with A. S. Buford, Henry L. Carter, John A. Curtis
- Preceded by: James N. Dunlop
- Succeeded by: Walter T. Booth

Personal details
- Born: August 24, 1853 Charles City County, Virginia, U.S.
- Died: February 12, 1935 (aged 81) Richmond, Virginia, U.S.
- Resting place: Hollywood Cemetery
- Spouse(s): Anne Baker Tucker (died 1921) Sue Ruffin (m. 1923)
- Children: 6, including Harrison Ruffin Tyler
- Parent(s): John Tyler; Julia Gardiner Tyler
- Education: University of Virginia

Lyon Gardiner Tyler Sr. (August 24, 1853 – February 12, 1935) was an American educator, politician, genealogist, and historian. He was a son of John Tyler, the tenth president of the United States. Tyler was the 17th president of the College of William & Mary. He was a member of the Virginia House of Delegates from 1887 to 1889. He was also an advocate of historical research and preservation, and a prominent critic of U.S. President Abraham Lincoln.

== Early life and education ==
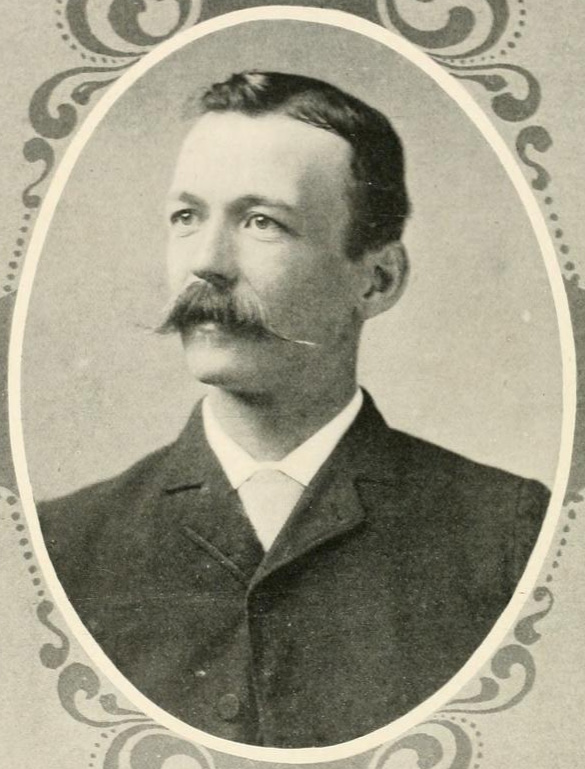
Lyon Gardiner Tyler as a young man (c. 1880)

Tyler was the fourth son of President John Tyler and First Lady Julia Gardiner Tyler, and was born at his father's Sherwood Forest Plantation in Charles City County. The former president, a prominent slaveholder and secessionist, died in January 1862, when Lyon was eight years old. Since the American Civil War had begun, Union troops would occupy the plantation several months later during the Peninsular Campaign, as well as during the Overland Campaign of 1864.

Meanwhile, Julia Tyler moved with her children north to Staten Island, where she had relatives. Following the Civil War, Tyler returned to Virginia in 1869 to complete his studies at the University of Virginia in Charlottesville. He earned both a bachelor's degree and a master's degree in law from the University of Virginia, and graduated in 1875. While at the university he was a member of Kappa Sigma and the Jefferson Literary Society, and contributed to the school's literary magazine.

== Early teaching, legal and political careers ==
Following graduation from the University of Virginia, Tyler spent a year teaching philosophy and literature at the College of William & Mary, near his family's Sherwood Forest plantation. Since the college was struggling financially, it stopped paying his salary. Tyler then resigned and moved to Memphis, Tennessee, where he spent several years as principal of a private school.

In 1882, Tyler returned to Virginia to practice law in Richmond, where his mother had moved. With his mother's support, he began work on The Letters and Times of the Tylers, a three-volume study of the careers of his father and paternal grandfather, John Tyler Sr. This would be published between 1884 and 1896.

Tyler also advocated reforming public education during his time in Richmond. He helped revive the Virginia Mechanics Institute, both as a board member and as an instructor. In 1887, Richmond voters elected Tyler as one of their four representatives in the Virginia House of Delegates, where he served alongside A.S. Buford, Henry L. Carter and John A. Curtis. That session, Tyler's advocacy led legislators to approve $10,000 to restore the College of William and Mary, which had received no funding for several years and had not yet recovered from a Civil War battle (Battle of Williamsburg) and later neglect. When Virginia's governor signed the appropriation into law, the college reopened in 1888, and its trustees named Tyler its president.

== President of the College of William and Mary ==
From 1888 to 1919, Tyler served as the 17th president of the College of William & Mary (W&M). He restored the college's finances following the deterioration which took place in and following the Civil War. During his tenure, Tyler was also chairman of the history department, and with six other professors formed the body known as the "Seven Wise Men". He also started the William and Mary Quarterly journal. Tyler also advocated women's suffrage and supported Minnie Braithwaite Jenkins, the first woman to attempt to take classes at W&M in 1896, although her petition was denied. He oversaw the college when it ultimately began admitting women in 1918.

While at William & Mary, Tyler became interested in the history of Virginia. He researched throughout the state, and campaigned for the preservation of local records. In 1896 he persuaded the Virginia General Assembly to appropriate $5,000 to copy 17th-century court records, which set a precedent for spending public monies to preserve state records. Preservation became his mission in later years, and he traveled extensively throughout the Commonwealth to find material. In 1915 he was appointed to the State Library Board and would serve until his death. He was a member of the Virginia Historical Society for fifty-two years, including forty-seven years on its executive committee and thirty-two as a vice president. A prolific author, his work spurred recognition of the significance of both Jamestown and Williamsburg to American history. However, his historical philosophy, "Ancestry is only of public interest as it reflects credit upon descendants," now seems quaint at best. As discussed below, Tyler also attempted to rehabilitate his father's political reputation.

During his time at William and Mary, Tyler was elected to the American Philosophical Society.

== Criticism of President Lincoln and retirement ==
Tyler received notoriety late in life for criticizing President Abraham Lincoln on numerous occasions. The first came in 1917 in response to an editorial in The New York Times, The Hohenzollerns and the Slave Power, which analogized Southern slaveholders to the German aristocrats then engaging Europe in what became known as World War I. Tyler wrote that Lincoln more closely resembled the Prussian nobility because he was opposed to the rights of self-determination of the Confederate states, in the same way that Germany was opposed to the rights of various smaller nations of Europe.

Tyler resigned as president of William and Mary in June 1919. During his tenure the college's enrollment increased to over 200 students. The number of faculty members had grown to fourteen, and twelve buildings were either renovated or constructed. The school also became a public institution, an effort Tyler had spearheaded. He retired to his farm, Lion's Den, in Charles City County but remained active as a writer, speaker, and researcher.

In 1928, when the Virginia House of Delegates chose to adjourn in honor of Lincoln's birthday, Tyler contended that Lincoln was no hero and did not merit the honor. When Time fired back that Lincoln dwarfed Tyler's father both in stature and in accomplishments, Tyler retorted with a pamphlet claiming that Lincoln was the dwarf. In retirement, he continued the crusade against Lincoln, publishing many articles in his own journal, Tyler's Quarterly and Genealogical Magazine, that were highly critical of the sixteenth president.

In one of his last publications, a short pamphlet titled A Confederate Catechism, Tyler wrote: "Both from the standpoint of the Constitution and sound statesmanship, it was not slavery, but the vindictive, intemperate anti-slavery movement that was at the bottom of all the troubles." The Sons of Confederate Veterans and the United Daughters of the Confederacy reprinted it and recommended children recite it.

== Personal life ==
Tyler married twice. His first wife was Anne Baker Tucker of Albemarle County, with whom he had three children: John Tyler; Elizabeth Gilmer Tyler; and Julia Gardiner Tyler Wilson, one of the founders of Kappa Delta.

Following Anne's death in 1921, Tyler married Sue Ruffin, daughter of John A. Ruffin and 36 years Tyler's junior, on September 12, 1923. They had three children: Lyon Gardiner Tyler Jr. (1925–2020); Harrison Ruffin Tyler (1928–2025); and Henry Tyler, who died in infancy in 1931. In late August 2018, Lyon Jr. participated in a reunion of presidential descendants hosted by the White House Historical Association, and signed, along with other presidential descendants, a drawer from a copy of the Resolute Desk.

== Major works ==
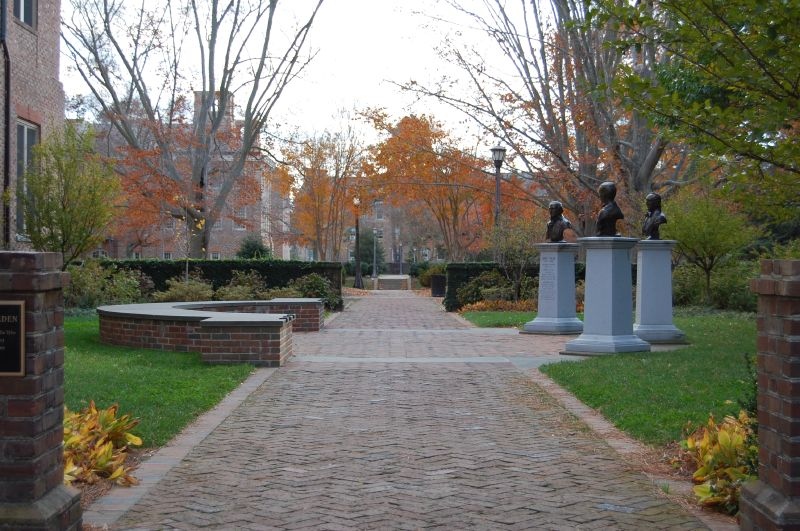
Tyler Memorial Garden, dedicated to Lyon Gardiner Tyler, his father, and his grandfather

Tyler's major works include:

- The Letters and Times of the Tylers (three volumes, 1884–1896)
- Parties and Patronage in the United States (1891)
- The Cradle of the Republic: Jamestown and the James River (1900)
- England in America (1904)
- Williamsburg, the Old Colonial Capital (1907)
- Men of Mark in Virginia (1906–1909)
- Encyclopedia of Virginia Biography (1915)
- History of Virginia from 1763 to 1861 (1924)
- A Confederate Catechism (1929)

== Death and legacy ==
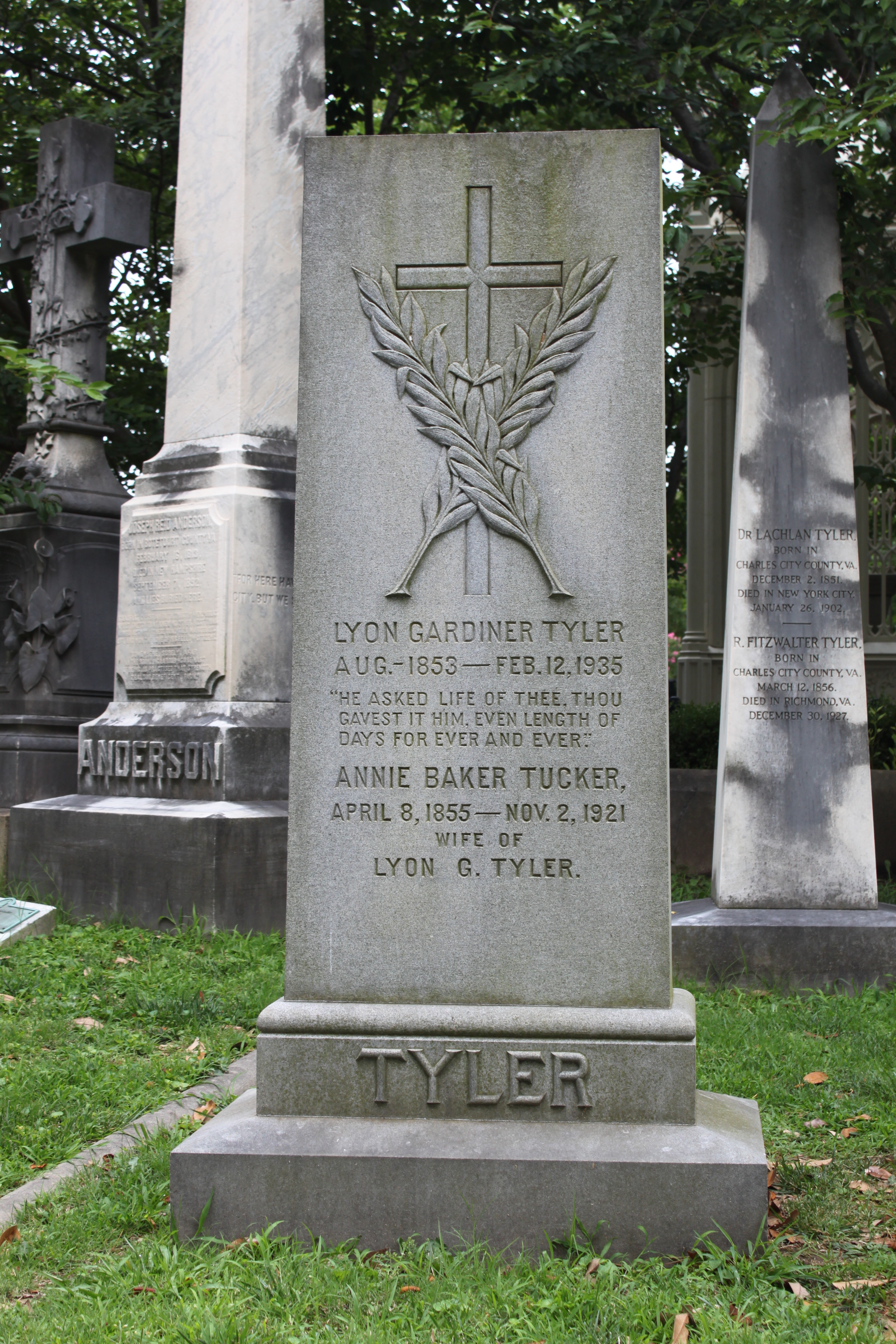
Grave of Tyler and his first wife in Hollywood Cemetery

Tyler died of pneumonia on February 12, 1935, in Richmond, where he is buried at Hollywood Cemetery. His childhood home in Charles City County, Sherwood Forest Plantation, was designated a National Historic Landmark in 1961 and placed on the National Register of Historic Places in 1966. Although still owned and occupied by descendants of the Tyler family, tours of the plantation are offered.

At the College of William & Mary, the Special Collections Research Center houses:

- Lyon Gardiner Tyler Sr.'s personal papers
- Papers as president of the College of William & Mary

The Tyler Garden at William & Mary is dedicated to Tyler as well as his father and paternal grandfather, both of whom were alumni of the college. Located next to James Blair Hall, which houses the university's history department, the garden contains busts of the three men, and was dedicated on April 30, 2004. It was funded as part of a $5 million gift from Lyon's son, Harrison Ruffin Tyler, and his wife.

Tyler's name was removed from several William & Mary institutions in the wake of the 2020 George Floyd protests and the broader movement to reexamine historical commemoration, due to his role upholding academic discourses that justified racial segregation. The history department, previously named the Lyon Gardiner Tyler Department of History, was renamed the Harrison Ruffin Tyler Department of History in honor of Tyler's son. The Lyon Tyler Grant in History for undergraduate majors was likewise renamed for Harrison Ruffin Tyler. The academic building adjacent to James Blair Hall, renamed Tyler Hall in honor of Tyler and his father in 1988, had its name reverted to Chancellors Hall.

== See also ==
- Seven Society (College of William & Mary)
- List of oldest fathers
