= USS Dawn (1857) =

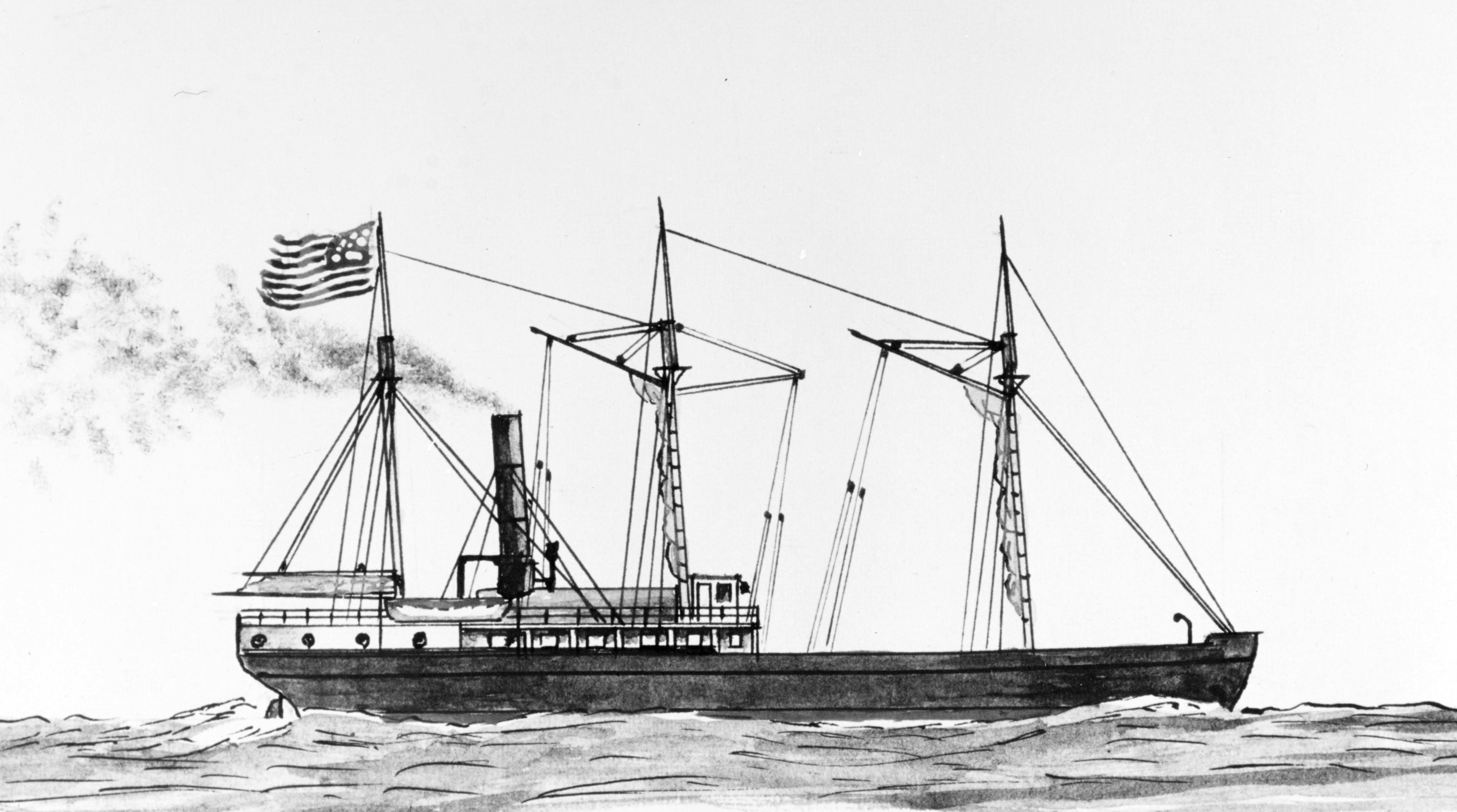
- Dawn in merchant service

History

United States
- Name: USS Dawn
- Laid down: date unknown
- Launched: 1857
- Acquired: 26 April 1861
- Commissioned: 9 May 1861
- Decommissioned: 17 June 1865
- Fate: Sold, 1 November 1865

General characteristics
- Type: Steamer
- Displacement: 399 long tons (405 t)
- Length: 154 ft (47 m)
- Beam: 28 ft (8.5 m)
- Draft: 12 ft (3.7 m)
- Propulsion: Steam engine; screw-propelled
- Speed: 8 kn (9.2 mph; 15 km/h)
- Complement: 60
- Armament: 2 × 32-pounder guns

The first USS Dawn was a steam-operated vessel acquired by the Union Navy during the American Civil War. She was used by the Navy to patrol navigable waterways of the Confederacy to prevent the South from trading with other countries.

Dawn — a screw steamer — was built in 1857 by Samuel Sneden, New York City; chartered on 26 April 1861 and purchased on 12 October 1861; outfitted at New York Navy Yard; and commissioned on 9 May 1861, Commander W. Chandler in command.

== Assigned to the Potomac Flotilla ==
Assigned to duty with the Potomac Flotilla, Dawn sailed from New York on 11 May and took station at the mouth of the York River on blockade duty until 24 September. During this time, she captured three ships with contraband goods and passengers on board. After repairs at Washington Navy Yard, she was sent up the Rappahannock River on blockade duty in November.

== Reassigned to the South Atlantic Blockade ==
Dawn had a new boiler installed at New York Navy Yard from 7 February-27 April 1862, then stood out for Port Royal, South Carolina, for service with the South Atlantic Blockading Squadron. Arriving on station on 14 May, she patrolled the coastal and inland waters of South Carolina, Georgia, and Florida, frequently exchanging fire with enemy shore batteries, and joining in the attacks on Fort McAllister of 27 January-1 February 1863. She also assisted in the capture of several blockade runners, including the Confederate privateer Nashville with a valuable cargo of cotton.

== Operating with the North Atlantic Blockade ==
Out of commission at New York from 9 July-2 December for repairs, Dawn departed on 10 December to join the North Atlantic Blockading Squadron and cruised in the James River from 14 December 1863 – 25 March 1865, performing picket duty and assisting in keeping the river banks free from enemy batteries. On 24 May 1864, she was influential in the defence of Wilson's Wharf, Virginia near Charles City. The wharf's garrison of 1,100 USCT under the command of Brigadier General Edward A. Wild was assaulted by 2,500 Confederate cavalrymen under the command of Major General Fitzhugh Lee. Between the stout resistance of the USCT troops and the Dawn's guns, the Confederates were driven back. Wilson's Wharf and the soon to be completed Fort Pocahontas remained in Union hands for the duration of the war.

== Post-war decommissioning and sale ==
Dawn was placed out of commission on 17 June 1865 at Portsmouth Navy Yard and later taken to Boston Navy Yard and sold on 1 November.
