= James D. Patton =

American politician

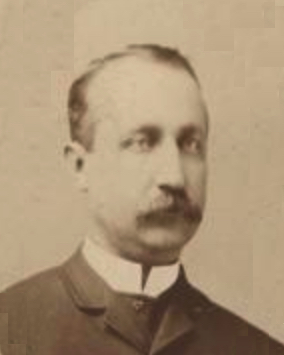
- Portrait of Patton, c. 1887

Member of the Virginia House of Delegates from Richmond City
- In office December 2, 1885 – December 8, 1887 Serving with James N. Dunlop, Ashton Starke, & Henry L. Carter
- Preceded by: Thomas J. Evans
- Succeeded by: John A. Curtis

Personal details
- Born: James Doddridge Patton; October 11, 1850 Danville, Virginia, U.S.
- Died: February 4, 1925 (aged 74) Richmond, Virginia, U.S.
- Party: Democratic
- Spouse: Ann Wagener Leary (m. 1889)

Military service
- Allegiance: Confederate States
- Branch/service: Confederate Home Guard
- Unit: Danville Home Guard
- Battles/wars: American Civil War

James Doddridge Patton (October 11, 1850 – February 4, 1925) was an American politician who served in the Virginia House of Delegates.
