= Sumner Carruth =

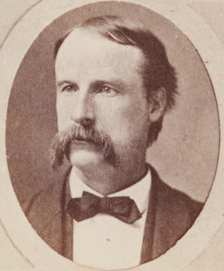
- Born: December 22, 1834; North Brookfield, Massachusetts
- Died: March 10, 1892 (aged 57); Andover, Massachusetts
- Burial place: West Parish Cemetery, Andover, Massachusetts
- Military career
- Allegiance: United States of America; Union
- Branch: United States Army; Union Army
- Service years: 1861 – 1865
- Rank: Brevet brigadier general
- Commands: 35th Regiment Massachusetts Volunteer Infantry; 2nd Brigade, 2nd Division, IX Corps; 1st Brigade, 1st Division, IX Corps
- Conflicts: American Civil War
- Other work: U.S. Customs official

Sumner Carruth (December 22, 1834 - March 10, 1892) was an officer in the volunteer army of the United States during the American Civil War. He commanded the 35th Massachusetts Volunteer Infantry and eventually rose to the command of two different brigades in the IX Corps.

== Before the American Civil War ==
Carruth was born on December 22, 1834, in North Brookfield, Massachusetts. He worked as a machinist. At the outbreak of the American Civil War he was a militia officer. His company, the Chelsea Light Infantry, was mustered into the federal service as Company H of the 1st Massachusetts Infantry in 1861. 1st Lt. Carruth was credited with the leading role in persuading the company to volunteer.

== Civil War service ==
On May 22, 1861, Carruth, became captain of Company H by election. He first saw combat at First Bull Run in the brigade of Col. Israel B. Richardson. Carruth next served in the Army of the Potomac during the Peninsula Campaign. The regiment was in the III Corps in the division of Maj. Gen. Joseph Hooker. Carruth was present at the Battle of Yorktown (1862), where his company distinguished itself. The company also fought at the Battle of Williamsburg. Carruth was wounded in the arm at the Battle of Seven Pines, apparently missing the subsequent battles of the Peninsula Campaign.

Carruth returned to the field as a major in the newly organized 35th Massachusetts Infantry, commissioned at that rank on August 21, 1862. He was promoted to the rank of lieutenant colonel on August 27 of that year. The regiment served in IX Corps in the division of Brig. Gen. Samuel D. Sturgis. Carruth was present at the Battle of South Mountain, where the commander, Col. Edward A. Wild was wounded. Carruth succeeded to command, but he was wounded at the Battle of Antietam near Burnside's Bridge. Carruth was captured at Fauquier White Sulphur Springs, on November 11, 1862, missing the Battle of Fredericksburg.

After being exchanged, Carruth next served in IX Corps in the Department of the Ohio. He became colonel of his regiment on May 1, 1863, and served with the corps in the Siege of Vicksburg, as well as in Eastern Tennessee. Carruth led the 2nd brigade, 2nd division, IX Corps from February 2 to March 3, 1864, before the Corps was transferred back to Virginia. In Virginia, he led the same brigade in April 1864. Then he led the 1st brigade, 1st division, IX Corps from April 25 to May 6, 1864. On the second day of the Battle of the Wilderness, May 6, Carruth's brigade was involved in the fighting on the Orange Plank Road. Fighting in the Wilderness alongside the troops of Brig. Gen. Alexander Webb and Brig. Gen. James Wadsworth, Carruth was felled by sunstroke and carried from the field.

Col. Carruth returned to IX Corps in the Army of the Potomac late in 1864 during the Siege of Petersburg, command his regiment. He led a brigade in the second division from January 23 to February 11, 1865, in the absence of Brig. Gen. John I. Curtin. He did so again from May 4 to June 9 of that year, serving in the Department of Washington after the Confederate surrender. Carruth was mustered out of the volunteer service on June 9, 1865. On January 13, 1866, President Andrew Johnson nominated Carruth for the award of the honorary grade of brevet brigadier general, U.S. Volunteers, to rank from April 9, 1865, and the U.S. Senate confirmed the award on March 12, 1866. His brevet was awarded for gallant and meritorious services in the attack on Fort Mahone on April 2, 1865, during the Third Battle of Petersburg. Maj. Gen. John G. Parke, commander of IX Corps, recommended him; and two other officers commended his regiment for its role in that action.

== Post-War ==
Sumner Carruth married Clara Smith of Newark, New Jersey, on August 18, 1862, just before leaving the 1st Massachusetts and joining the 35th regiment. The Sumner's had two daughters, Minnie Hale, born in 1863, and Clara Louise, born in 1869. Carruth farmed and served as a customs official. Sumner died in 1892 in Andover, Massachusetts, and was buried in the West Parish Cemetery.

== See also ==
- 1873 Massachusetts legislature
- List of Massachusetts generals in the American Civil War
- Massachusetts in the American Civil War

== Sources ==
- Frederick H. Dyer, Compendium of the War of the Rebellion, Des Moines, Ia.: Dyer Pub. Co., 1908, vol. 1.
- John H. Eicher; David J. Eicher (2001). Civil War High Commands. ISBN 978-0-8047-3641-1.
- Hunt, Roger D. and Brown, Jack R., Brevet Brigadier Generals in Blue. Olde Soldier Books, Inc., Gaithersburg, MD, 1990. ISBN 1-56013-002-4.
- Gordon C. Rhea (2004-09-30). Battle of the Wilderness, May 5-6, 1864. LSU Press. ISBN 978-0-8071-3021-6.
- Stewart Sifakis, Who Was Who in the Civil War, New York, N.Y. : Facts on File, c1988, p. 109.
