= 35th Massachusetts Infantry Regiment =

35th Massachusetts Volunteer Infantry
- Active: August 1, 1862 to June 27, 1865
- Country: United States
- Allegiance: Union
- Branch: Infantry
- Size: 1,496
- Engagements: Battle of South Mountain; Battle of Antietam; Battle of Fredericksburg; Siege of Vicksburg; Siege of Jackson; Knoxville Campaign; Rapidan Campaign; Battle of the Wilderness; Battle of Spotsylvania Court House; Battle of North Anna; Battle of Totopotomoy Creek; Battle of Cold Harbor; Siege of Petersburg; Battle of the Crater; Battle of Globe Tavern; Battle of Boydton Plank Road; Battle of Fort Stedman; Appomattox Campaign; Third Battle of Petersburg

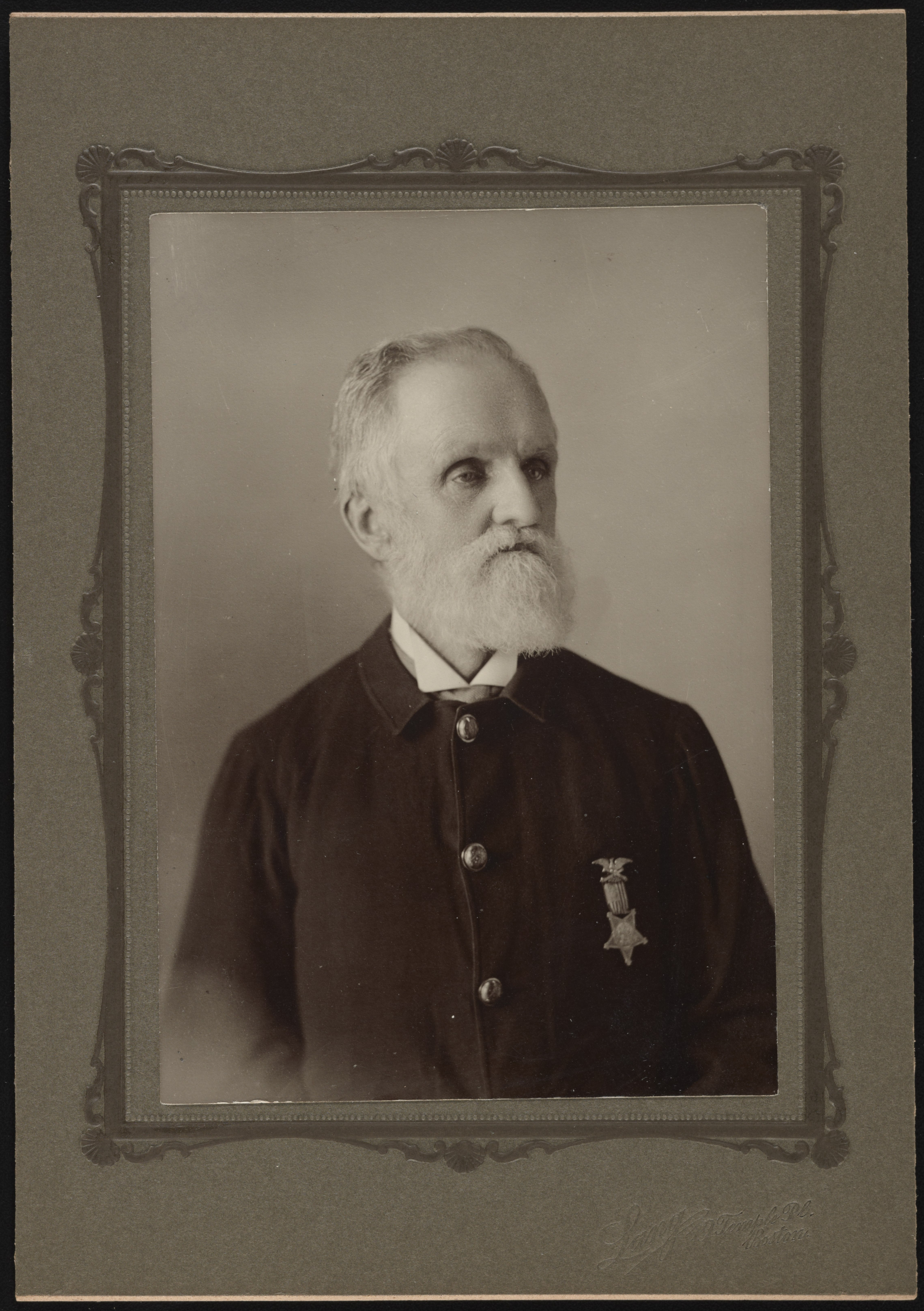
Union veteran Sergeant Charles B. Lovell of Co. K, 35th Massachusetts Infantry Regiment. From the Liljenquist Family Collection of Civil War Photographs, Prints and Photographs Division, Library of Congress

The 35th Massachusetts was an infantry regiment that served in the Union Army during the American Civil War.

== Service ==
The 35th Massachusetts was organized at Boston and Chelsea, Massachusetts, trained at Camp Stanton from August 1–22, 1862, and mustered in for three-year service on August 28, 1862 under the command of Colonel Edward A. Wild.

The regiment was attached to 2nd Brigade, 2nd Division, IX Corps, Army of the Potomac, to April 1863. Department of the Ohio to June 1863. Army of the Tennessee to August 1863, and Department of the Ohio to April 1864. 1st Brigade, 1st Division, IX Corps, Army of the Potomac, to May 1864. Acting Engineers, 1st Division, IX Corps, to July 1864. 1st Brigade, 1st Division, IX Corps, to September 1864. 1st Brigade, 2nd Division, IX Corps, to June 1865.

The 35th Massachusetts mustered out of service on June 9, 1865 and was discharged June 27, 1865.

=== Company I ===
The results of the Peninsular campaign revealed the necessity of replenishing the army. In early in July 1862, the president had called for 300,000 men for three years and assigned the quota of Massachusetts at 15,000 men. The quota of Dedham, Massachusetts was 69 and the Selectmen, through whom thenceforward all recruiting during the war was carried on, issued their call for that number. On July 21, the town voted to pay a bounty of $100 to each volunteer with aid to families. It also appropriated $6,900 for the bounties.

One of the largest and most impressive of the public meetings during the war was held July 10, before the legal town meeting. Men were there inspired by an earnest purpose to devote themselves to the country. After the preliminary discussion as to bounties, the roll was opened and then came a pause when it seemed doubtful if any would come forward. The first man to sign that roll was the father of Joseph Jordan, the private who had been killed at Gaines Mills. Another was a young man who had been recently graduated at the university and was beginning his professional studies. A third announced his purpose in impressive and earnest words. He would later receive a severe wound in battle and then nearly a year's confinement in four rebel prisons. The quota was soon filled.

Uniting with men from Needham and Weston, the new recruits constituted Company I of the 35th Massachusetts Infantry Regiment. Without any opportunities for drill or organization, the regiment left the state on August 22, 1862 for the seat of war. On their arrival at Washington, they were immediately assigned to the defenses of the city in throwing up earthworks and doing picket duty.

== Detailed service ==
Left Massachusetts for Washington, D.C., August 22. Marched into Maryland September 6–12, 1862. Battle of South Mountain, Md., September 14. Battle of Antietam September 16–17. Duty at Pleasant Valley until October 27. Movement to Falmouth, Va., October 27-November 19. Warrenton, Sulphur Springs, November 15. Battle of Fredericksburg December 12–15. "Mud March" January 20–24, 1863. At Falmouth until February 19. Moved to Newport News, Va., February 19, then to Covington, Ky., March 26–30. Moved to Paris April 1, and to Mt. Sterling April 3. To Lancaster May 6–7, then to Crab Orchard May 23, and to Stanford May 25. Movement to Vicksburg, Miss., June 3–14. Siege of Vicksburg June 14-July 4. Advance on Jackson, Miss., July 5–10. Siege of Jackson July 10–17. At Milldale until August 6. Moved to Cincinnati, Ohio, August 6–14. At Covington, Ky., until August 18. Marched to Nicholasville August 18–25, and to Crab Orchard September 9–11. Marched over the Cumberland Mountains to Knoxville, Tenn., then to Lenoir Station October 2–29. Knoxville Campaign November 4-December 23. At Lenoir Station until November 14. Campbell's Station November 16. Siege of Knoxville November 17-December 4. Pursuit of Longstreet December 5–19. Operations in eastern Tennessee until March 20, 1864. Movement to Annapolis, Md., March 20-April 7. Rapidan Campaign May–June. Battle of the Wilderness May 5–7. Spotsylvania May 8–12. Ny River May 10. Spotsylvania Court House May 12–21. Assault on the Salient May 12. North Anna River May 23–26. On line of the Pamunkey May 26–28. Totopotomoy May 28–31. Cold Harbor June 1–12. Bethesda Church June 1–3. Before Petersburg June 16–18. Siege of Petersburg June 16, 1864 to April 2, 1865. Mine Explosion, Petersburg, July 30, 1864. Weldon Railroad August 18–21. Poplar Springs Church September 29-October 2. Boydton Plank Road, Hatcher's Run, October 27–28. Fort Stedman March 25, 1865. Appomattox Campaign March 28-April 9. Assault on and fall of Petersburg April 2. Occupation of Petersburg April 3. March to Farmville April 4–10. Moved to City Point, then to Alexandria April 20–28. Grand Review of the Armies May 23.

== Casualties ==
The regiment lost a total of 249 men during service; 10 officers and 138 enlisted men killed or mortally wounded, 1 officer and 100 enlisted men died of disease.

== Commanders ==
- Colonel Edward A. Wild - promoted to brigadier general April 24, 1863
- Colonel Sumner Carruth
- Major Sidney Willard - commanded at the Battle of Fredericksburg where he was mortally wounded in action
- Major Nathaniel Wales - commanded during the Knoxville Campaign
- Captain Stephen H. Andrews - commanded at the Battle of Fredericksburg after Maj. Willard was mortally wounded in action
- Captain Clifton A. Blanchard - commanded at the Battle of the Crater

== Notable members ==
- Sergeant Marcus M. Haskell, Company C - Medal of Honor recipient for action at the Battle of Antietam
- Captain William Sterling King, Company K - future colonel and brevet brigadier general
- Captain John Lathrop, Company I - associate justice of the Massachusetts Supreme Judicial Court, 1891-1906

== See also ==
- List of Massachusetts Civil War Units
- Massachusetts in the American Civil War
