= The General (horse) =

President John Tyler's horse

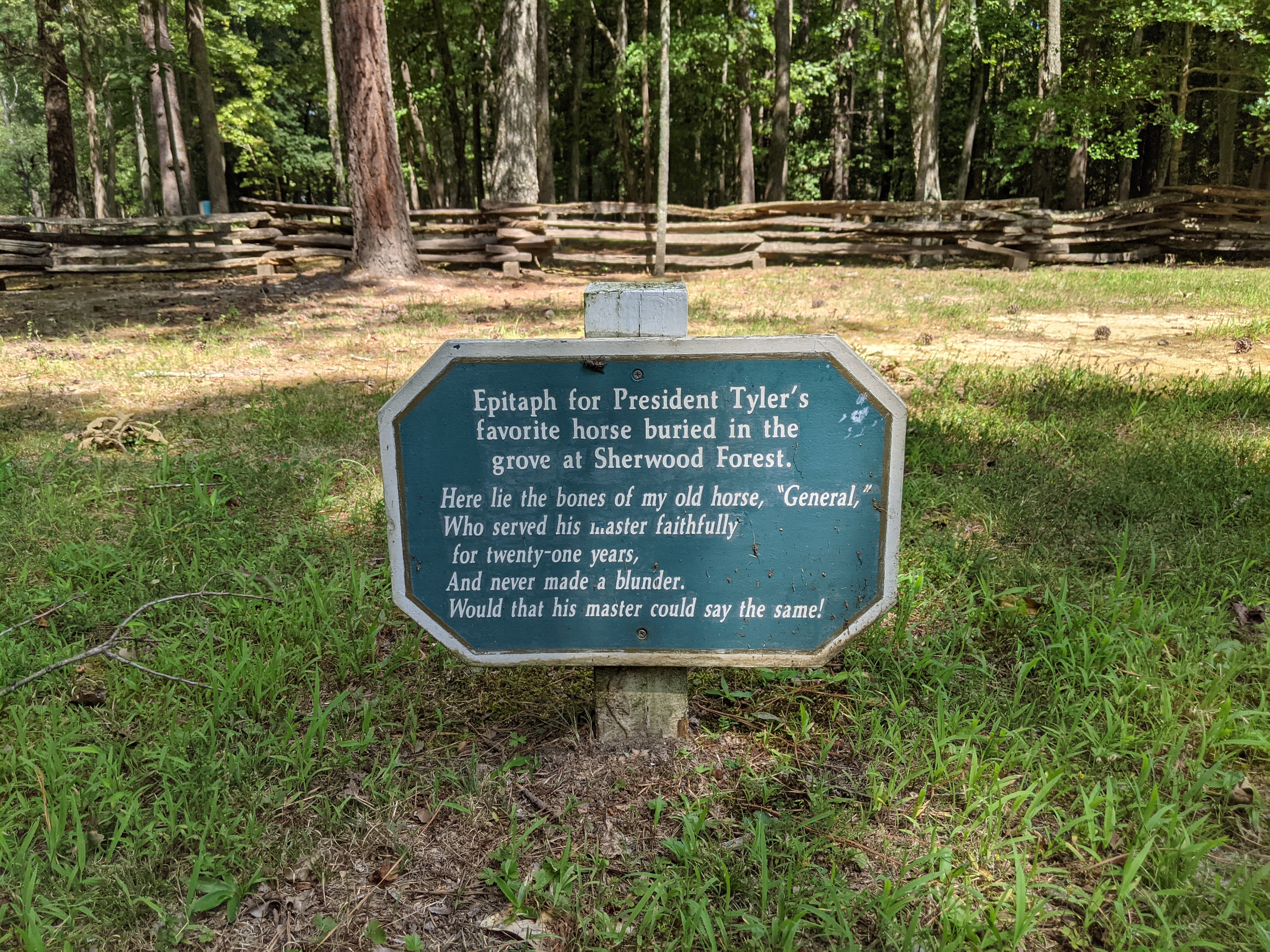
The General's grave, including the humorous epitaph by Tyler

The General was a horse owned by US President John Tyler. When he died, John Tyler had The General buried on his Sherwood Forest Plantation, in the Sherwood Forest Pet Cemetery.

The horse's epitaph reads:

Here lie the bones of my old horse, "General,"
who served his master faithfully
for twenty-one years.
And never made a blunder.
Would that his master could say the same!

== See also ==
- List of historical horses
