= Minnie Braithwaite Jenkins =

United States Indian Service educator

- Born: Minnie Galt Braithwaite; 1874; Williamsburg, Virginia, U.S.
- Died: 1954 (aged 79–80)
- Occupation: School teacher
- Employer: Bureau of Indian Affairs
- Known for: 1896 petition to the College of William & Mary to attend chemistry lectures
- Notable work: Girl from Williamsburg (1951)

Minnie Galt Braithwaite Jenkins (1874–1954) was a United States Indian Service (now known as the Bureau of Indian Affairs) school teacher and the first woman to attempt to take classes at The College of William & Mary.

== Biography ==
=== Education ===
Braithwaite was born in Williamsburg, Virginia. On October 2, 1896, she petitioned the faculty at the College of William & Mary to allow her to attend chemistry lectures. Her petition was denied 4 to 3. Among the seven men who voted, the President of the College Lyon Gardiner Tyler voted in favor of the petition and English professor John Lesslie Hall voted against it.

=== Career ===
Braithwaite intended to travel to China as a medical missionary after being trained at William & Mary to be a doctor, but this plan was derailed when her petition to attend was denied. Instead, Braithwaite began her teaching career in 1899 at the Blue Canyon Day School near the Hopi Reservation in Arizona. She later taught at the Fort Mojave School from 1902 to 1906. It was at Fort Mojave that she met and married Clarence W. Jenkins in 1906. Her memoir, Girl from Williamsburg, was published in 1951.

=== Legacy ===
The Gender, Sexuality, and Women’s Studies Department at the College of William & Mary hosts an annual lecture in commemoration of her efforts to attend classes at the College.

Some of her and her family’s papers can be found in the Special Collections Research Center at Earl Gregg Swem Library. One such paper is a letter from William & Mary Board of Visitors member Thomas Barnes to Braithwaite regarding her petition to attend classes at the College.

In 1996, her daughter Dorothy Jenkins Ross, a historian, published the book Jenkins Farms: Life on a Family Fruit Farm in Early California, 1910 about her family's life in Sutter County, California.
