= Marcus M. Haskell =

American soldier (1843–1925)

- Born: February 12, 1843; Chelsea, Massachusetts
- Died: October 29, 1925 (aged 82); Centerville, Massachusetts
- Burial place: Beechwood Cemetery, Centerville, Massachusetts
- Military career
- Allegiance: United States of America
- Branch: United States Army; Union Army
- Service years: 1862 - 1865
- Rank: Sergeant
- Units: Company C, 35th Regiment Massachusetts Volunteer Infantry
- Conflicts: Battle of Antietam; American Civil War
- Awards: Medal of Honor

Marcus M. Haskell (February 12, 1843 - October 29, 1925) was an American soldier who fought in the American Civil War. He received the Medal of Honor, the highest military award, for rescuing a wounded man while under fire at Antietam, on 17 September 1862, in spite of his own wound.

Haskell was born in Chelsea, Massachusetts, on February 12, 1843, and joined the Army in August 1862. He was wounded on no fewer than six occasions before finally mustering out in June 1865. He was awarded the Medal of Honor on 18 November 1896, for distinguished gallantry at the Battle of Antietam.

Haskell died on October 29, 1925, and was buried at the Beechwood Cemetery in Centerville, Massachusetts.

== Medal of Honor citation ==

Citation:

The President of the United States of America, in the name of Congress, takes pleasure in presenting the Medal of Honor to Sergeant Marcus M. Haskell, United States Army, for extraordinary heroism on 17 September 1862, while serving with Company C, 35th Massachusetts Infantry, in action at Antietam, Maryland. Although wounded and exposed to a heavy fire from the enemy, at the risk of his own life Sergeant Haskell rescued a badly wounded comrade and succeeded in conveying him to a place of safety.

== See also ==
- Antietam Campaign
- Battle of Antietam
- 35th Regiment Massachusetts Volunteer Infantry
