= Fort Pocahontas =

Archaeological site in Virginia, United States

- U.S. National Register of Historic Places
- Virginia Landmarks Register
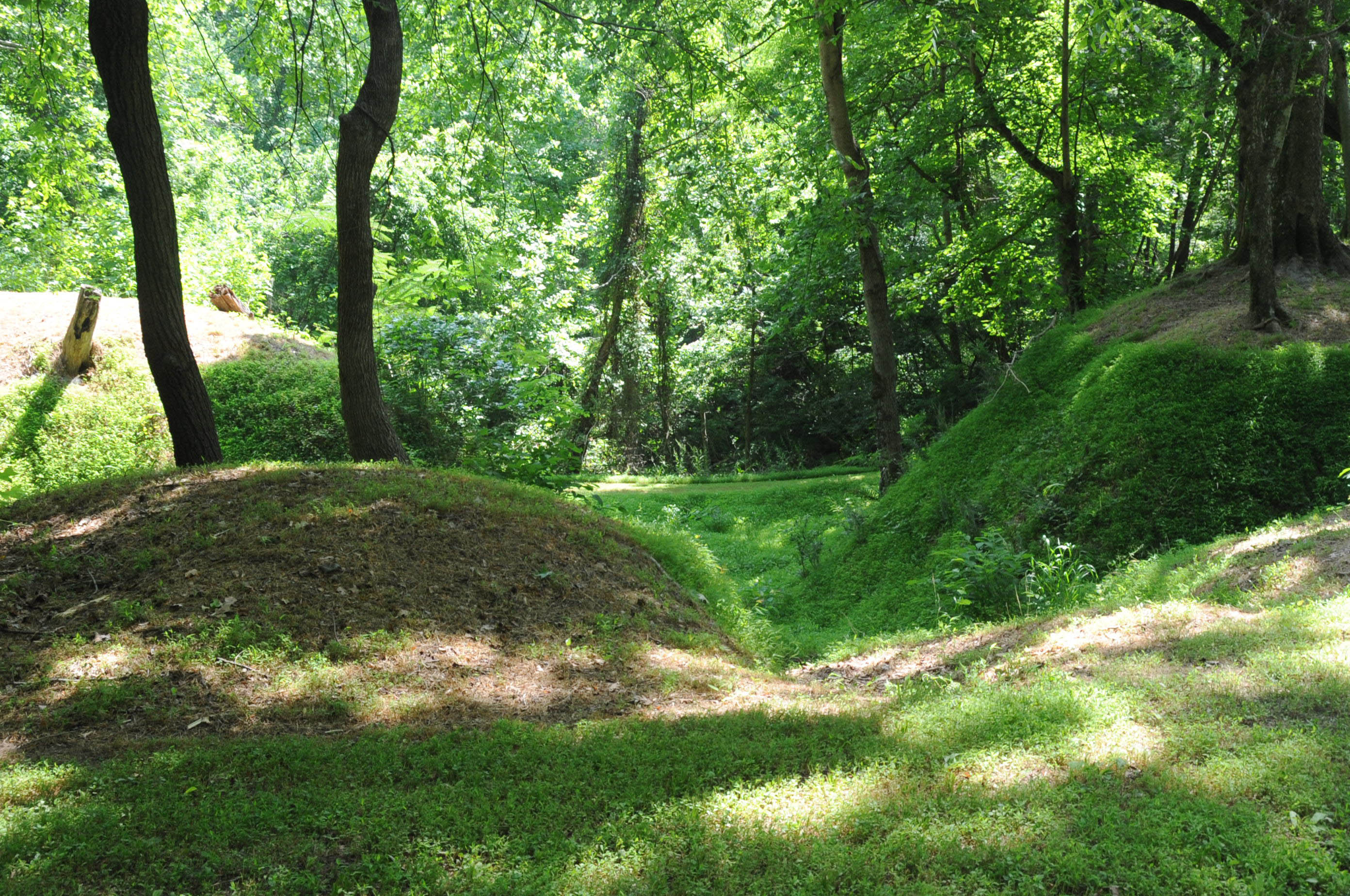

- Location within Virginia Location within the United States
- Nearest city: Charles City, Virginia
- Coordinates: 37°18′16″N 76°59′48″W
- Area: 60 acres (24 ha)
- Built: 1864
- Architect: United States Colored Troops, U.S. Army
- NRHP reference No.: 99000848
- VLR No.: 018-5001

Significant dates
- Added to NRHP: July 27, 1999
- Designated VLR: March 17, 1999

Fort Pocahontas was an earthen fort on the north bank of the James River at Wilson's Wharf, in Charles City County, Virginia which served as a Union supply depot during the American Civil War. The fort was constructed by African-American soldiers of the United States Colored Troops under the command of Brig. Gen. Edward Augustus Wild.

== History ==
On May 24, 1864, in the Battle of Wilson's Wharf, the partially completed fort was attacked by an estimated 2,500 Confederate cavalry soldiers under Maj. Gen. Fitzhugh Lee. The attack was successfully repulsed by approximately 1,100 troops under General Wild, aided by naval gunfire from the USS Dawn. According to Ed Besch's research, a Virginia military historian who is credited with much of the rediscovery of the "lost" site of the fort, Fitzhugh Lee was humiliated by defeat at the hands of black Union soldiers at a time when he was a candidate to replace J.E.B. Stuart (who had been killed May 11) as head of the cavalry corps of the Army of Northern Virginia. After completion, Fort Pocahontas served as a refuge for escaped slaves and was used to hold suspected Confederate sympathizers during the Siege of Petersburg until hostilities ended in April 1865.

The remote site had been largely forgotten and untouched by development for 130 years when, following Besch's research, it was purchased in 1996 by Harrison Ruffin Tyler. Tyler, born in 1928, and who lived nearby at Sherwood Forest Plantation, was the grandson of President John Tyler, and a descendant of John Rolfe, Pocahontas, President William Henry Harrison and Edmund Ruffin. The site has since been placed on the National Register of Historic Places. The William and Mary Center for Archaeological Research of the College of William and Mary in nearby Williamsburg has done extensive work at the site and about the events which took place there. More recently, annual Civil War reenactment events have been held at Fort Pocahontas. In 2005, many scenes of the motion picture The New World were filmed on-location at Fort Pocahontas, as well at other places nearby along the James and Chickahominy Rivers.
