= Thomas Henry Carter (soldier) =

American military figure and physician

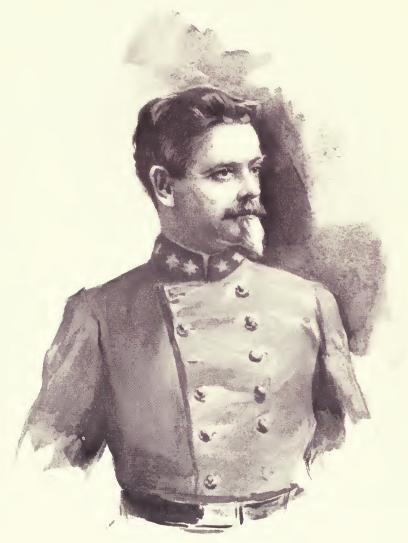
- Thomas Henry Carter
- Born: June 13, 1831; King William County, Virginia, U.S.
- Died: June 2, 1908 (aged 76); King William County, Virginia, U.S.
- Burial place: Hollywood Cemetery, Richmond, Virginia
- Military career
- Allegiance: Confederate States of America
- Branch: Confederate States Army
- Service years: 1861–65 (CSA)
- Rank: Colonel (CSA)
- Conflicts: American Civil War

Thomas Henry Carter (June 13, 1831 – June 2, 1908) was an artillery officer in the Confederate States Army during the American Civil War. His battalion played an important role in the Battle of Gettysburg.

== Early life ==
Carter was born in King William County, Virginia, the third of five children and the second son of Thomas Nelson Carter and Juliet Gaines Carter. His father was a first cousin to General Robert E. Lee. Carter was a member of the Virginia Military Institute (VMI) Class of 1849. He graduated with medical degrees from the University of Virginia (1851) and the University of Pennsylvania (1852). Carter did not engage in the practice of medicine. Instead, he returned to manage his father's plantation, Pampatike, after the overseer died.

== Civil War ==
He entered what became the Army of Northern Virginia in June 1861 as captain of the King William Artillery. His younger brother, Julian Carter of the 4th Virginia Cavalry, was killed in late July 1862 at a minor skirmish near Malvern Hill. Tom Carter was wounded in the foot at Sharpsburg. In December he was promoted to major, a rank he held until he became a lieutenant colonel in April 1863. By the Gettysburg campaign of 1863, Carter commanded a battalion of artillery in Lt. Gen. Richard S. Ewell's Second Corps. His guns unlimbered on Oak Hill northwest of Gettysburg and contributed to the eventual withdrawal of the Union First Corps of the Army of the Potomac. Carter's guns later supported Pickett's Charge on July 3. Promoted to colonel in March 1864, he remained with the Army of Northern Virginia during the Overland Campaign until September when he left to temporarily replace Brig. Gen. Armistead L. Long as chief of artillery for Lt. Gen. Jubal A. Early during the second half of Early's Valley Campaigns of 1864. Carter fought in several important battles, including the Battle of Cedar Creek.

== Post War career ==
Following the surrender of the Army of Northern Virginia at Appomattox Court House, Carter returned to his ancestral family plantation, Pampatike, which was located near the Pamunkey River in eastern Virginia, where he lived with his wife Susan (Roy) Carter and their three small children. Carter continued to farm the property, and his wife operated a school at the house. In the late 1870s Carter was appointed the first railroad commissioner in the state of Virginia. He held the position for a handful of years. In the late 1880s, he served for several years as a member of the board of arbitration of the Southern Railway and Steamship Association. Carter spent his final years as proctor and superintendent of grounds and buildings for the University of Virginia.

== Death ==
Carter died in 1908. He is buried in Hollywood Cemetery in Richmond, Virginia.
