= Harrison Ruffin Tyler =

American engineer and preservationist

- Tyler in 2018
- Born: November 9, 1928; Richmond, Virginia, U.S.
- Died: May 25, 2025 (aged 96); Richmond, Virginia, U.S.
- Education: College of William & Mary; Virginia Tech
- Occupations: Chemical engineer; Businessperson; Preservationist
- Spouse: Frances Payne Bouknight (m. 1957; died 2019)
- Children: 3
- Parents: Lyon Gardiner Tyler; Susan Ruffin Tyler
- Relatives: Harrison family of Virginia

Harrison Ruffin Tyler (November 9, 1928 – May 25, 2025) was an American businessman, preservationist, and archivist. Tyler was the last living grandchild of the tenth U.S. president, John Tyler (1790–1862). The period from the president's birth to his last grandchild's death spanned 235 years. Harrison Tyler was prominent in preserving Sherwood Forest Plantation, the Tyler ancestral home, and nearby Fort Pocahontas. He donated voluminous historic family materials and funds to the history department at the College of William & Mary, which bears his name. Tyler was also a chemical engineer and businessman who co-founded ChemTreat, Inc., a water treatment company.

== Early life and education ==
Tyler was born on November 9, 1928, in Richmond, Virginia, to Susan Ruffin and Lyon Gardiner Tyler. President John Tyler and First Lady Julia Gardiner were his paternal grandparents. Through his mother, he was a member of the Harrison family of Virginia and a great-grandson of Edmund Ruffin. His mother was a teacher and caretaker of the family's historical documents.

Tyler grew up poor during the Great Depression and his father died when he was age six. His older brother, Lyon Gardiner Tyler Jr., was homeschooled by his mother, and then attended Charles City County public schools. He later attended St. Christopher's School. Tyler's education at the College of William & Mary was funded by Nancy Astor, Viscountess Astor, with a $5,000 check, likely as a result of his father's friendship with Franklin D. Roosevelt. He graduated with a degree in chemistry in 1949. Due to a shortage of employment opportunities in chemistry, Tyler continued his education at Virginia Tech, where he received a degree in chemical engineering in 1951.

== Career ==
After graduating from Virginia Tech, Tyler worked as a project manager for Virginia-Carolina Chemical Corporation, and led a plant in Charleston, South Carolina. He familiarized himself with soft water and learned how to treat hard water when he worked as a start-up engineer for a plant in Cincinnati, Ohio. He received a patent in water treatment pertaining to shiny aluminum. In 1963, Virginia-Carolina Chemical Corporation was acquired by Mobil. The change in corporate culture prompted Tyler to leave the company and found ChemTreat, Inc., with partner William P. Simmons. The water treatment company was headquartered in Glen Allen, Virginia. He used chemistry to address problems with industrial water cooling systems. The company worked with hospitals and the paper and pulp sector. In 2000, Tyler led an employee stock ownership program at his company. ChemTreat was acquired by the Danaher Corporation in 2007.

== Personal life ==
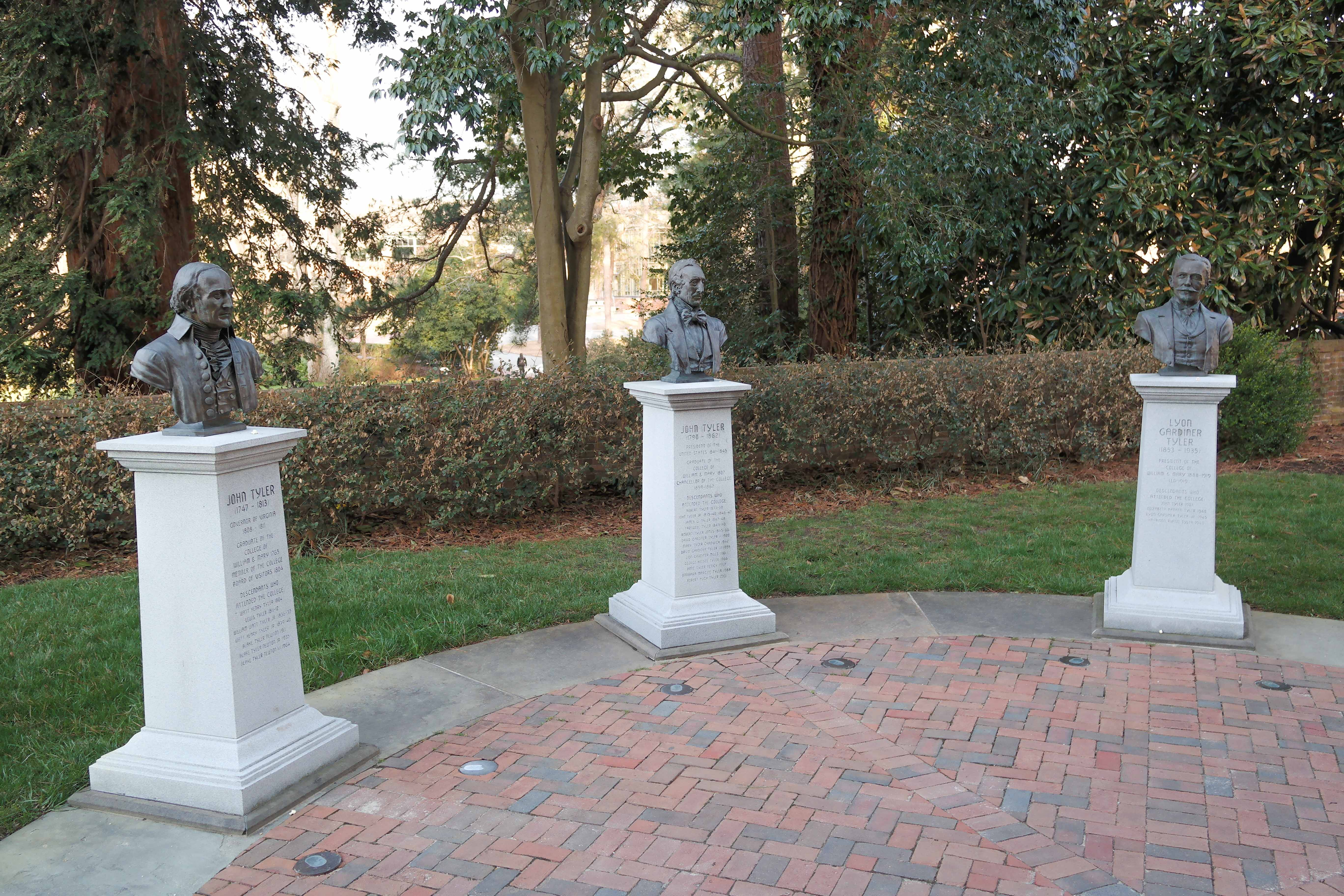
The Tyler Garden (pictured), dedicated to members of the Tyler family on the campus of the College of William & Mary, was constructed with funds donated by Tyler.

In July 1957, Tyler married Frances Payne Bouknight in Johnston, South Carolina. The couple lived in Richmond until her death on February 8, 2019. They had three children: Julia Gardiner Tyler Samaniego (born 1958), Harrison Ruffin Tyler Jr. (born 1960), and William Bouknight Tyler (born 1961).

The Tylers purchased Sherwood Forest Plantation from relatives in 1975 and oversaw its restoration. In 1996, they purchased Fort Pocahontas and funded its restoration. Beginning in 1997, he sponsored annual American Civil War reenactments at Wilson's Wharf. Tyler also collaborated with the William & Mary Center for Archaeological Research to assess and research Fort Pocahontas. In 2001, he donated $5 million and 22,000 books and documents on behalf of his father to the history department. Previously named for his father, Lyon Gardiner Tyler, in 2021 the college renamed the department the Harrison Ruffin Tyler Department of History in his honor. Tyler spoke often and passionately of his family's history, though expressed a disinterest in politics in an interview with New York magazine in 2012.

He suffered a series of mini-strokes in 2012. Tyler was diagnosed with dementia and lived in a nursing home in the area. He died at his home in Richmond on May 25, 2025, at the age of 96.
