= Sherwood Forest Plantation =

Historic house in Virginia, US

- John Tyler House (Sherwood Forest)
- U.S. National Register of Historic Places
- U.S. National Historic Landmark
- Virginia Landmarks Register
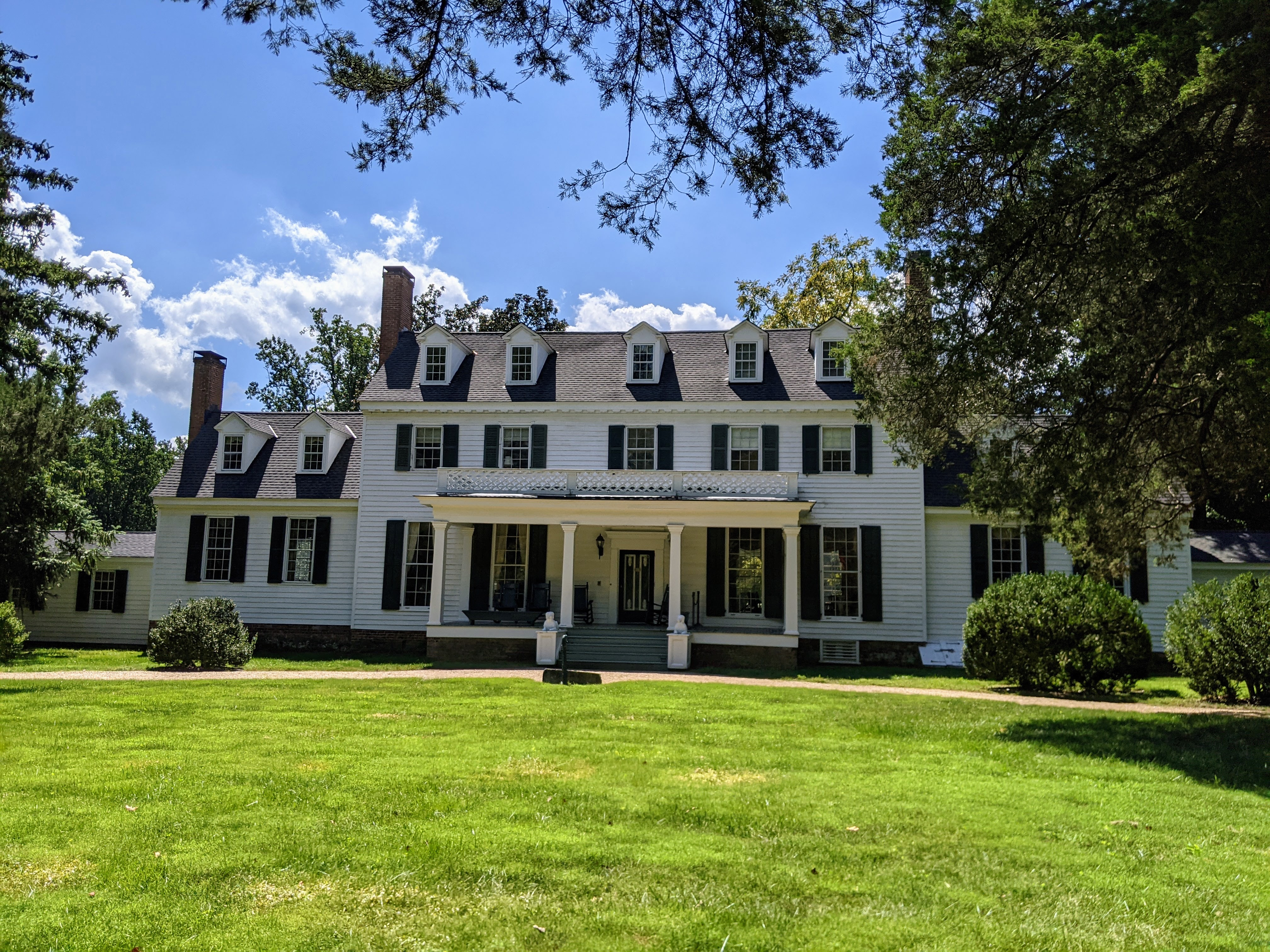
- Sherwood Forest in 2021

- Location within Virginia Location within the United States
- Nearest city: Charles City, Virginia
- Coordinates: 37°20′03″N 77°1′13″W
- Area: 40 acres (16 ha)
- Built: 1842
- Architectural style: Georgian
- NRHP reference No.: 66000922
- VLR No.: 018-0021

Significant dates
- Added to NRHP: October 15, 1966
- Designated NHL: July 4, 1961
- Designated VLR: September 9, 1969

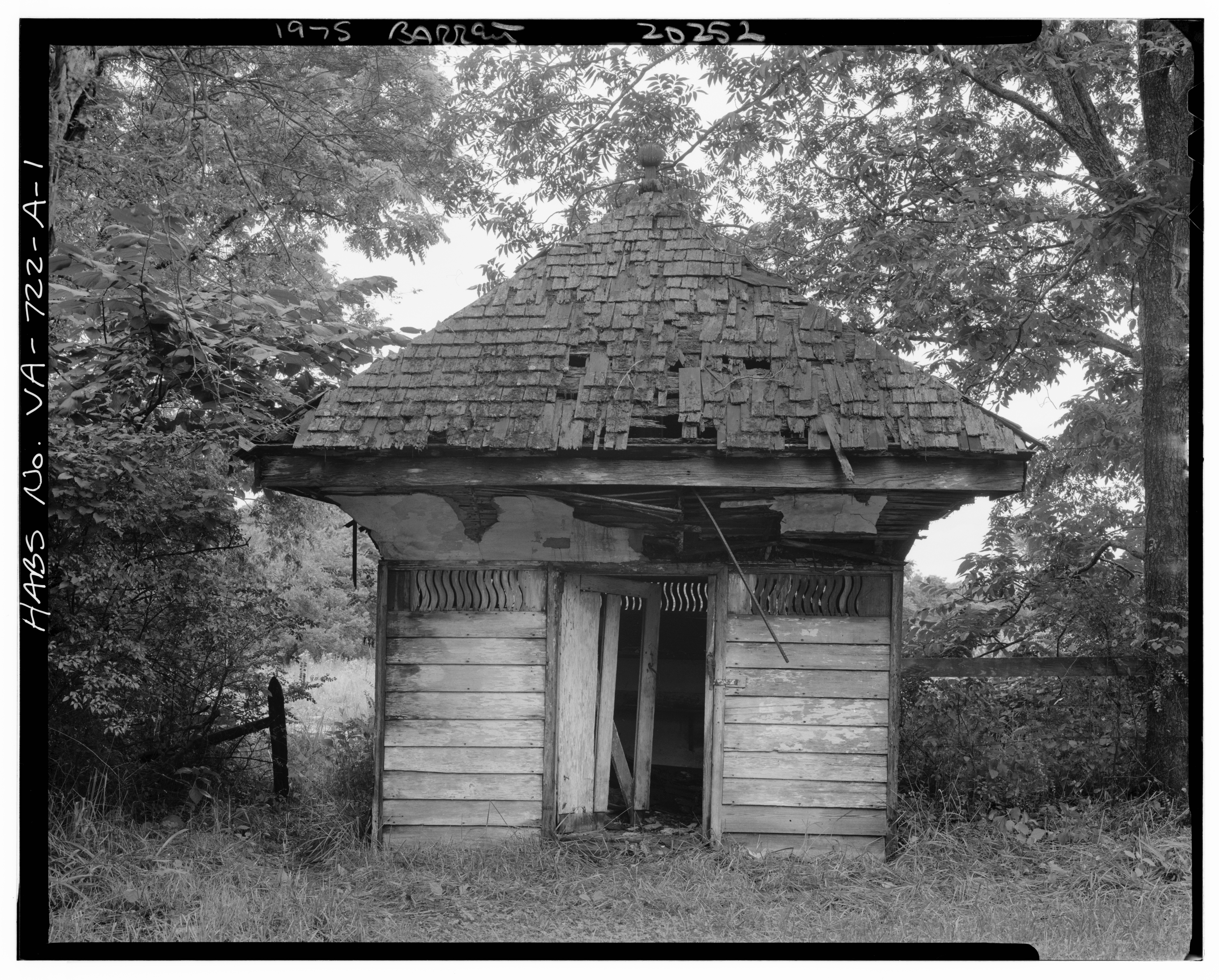
Dairy

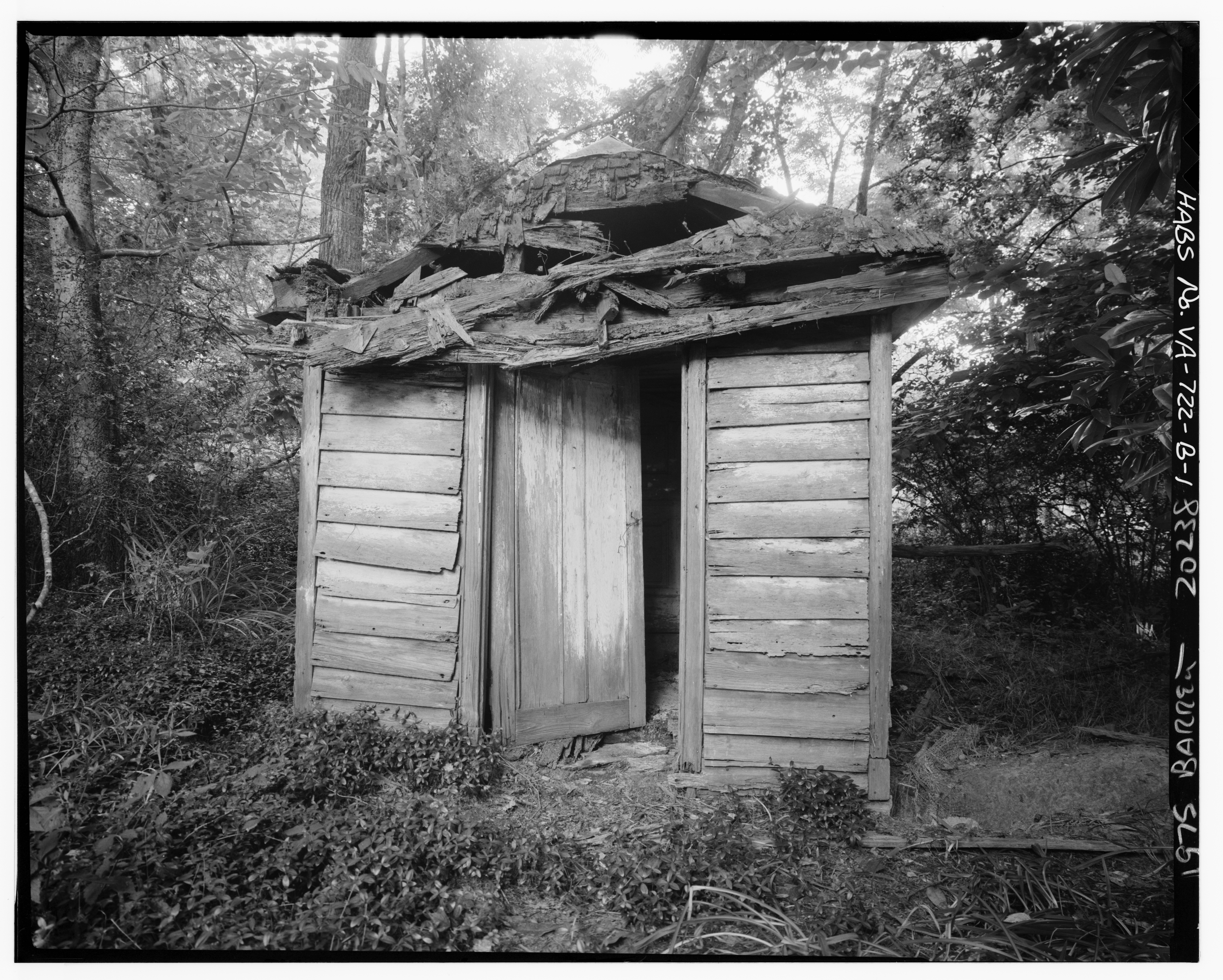
Outhouse

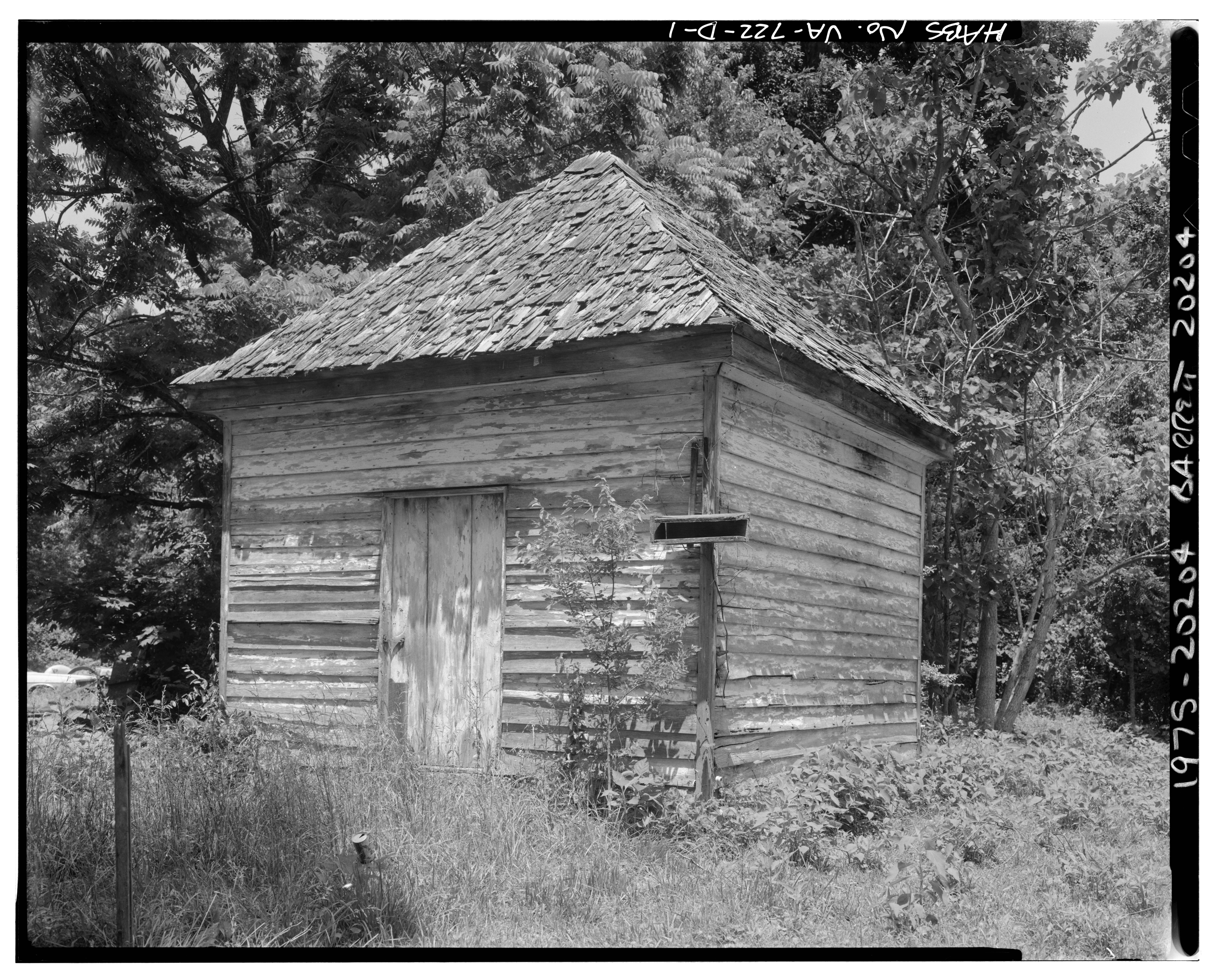
Wine house

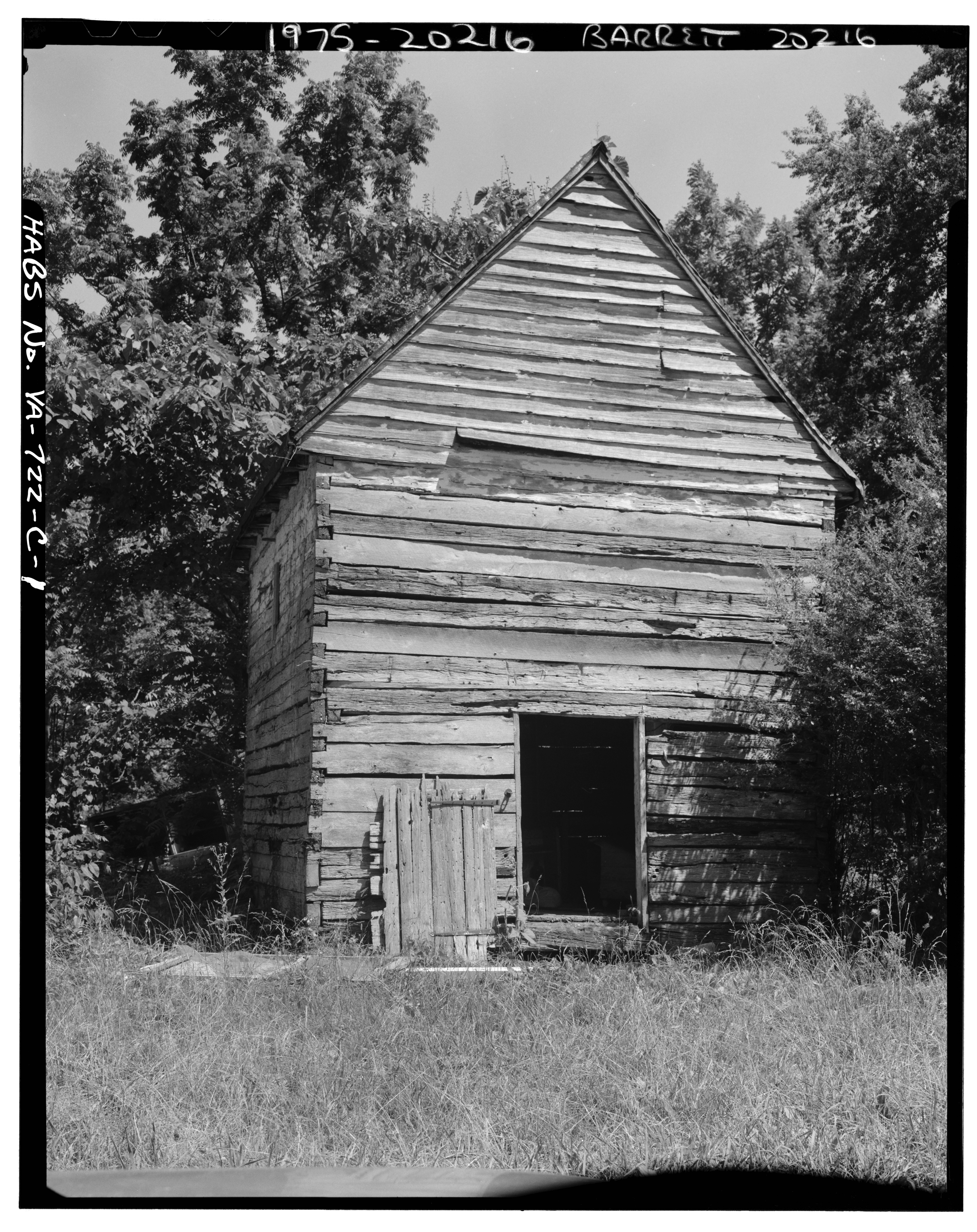
Smokehouse for tobacco

Various outbuildings on the plantation.

Sherwood Forest Plantation is located on the north bank of the James River in Charles City County, Virginia. The main plantation house, built in 1730, was the home of the tenth president of the United States, John Tyler (1790–1862) for the last twenty years of his life. It is located on State Route 5, a scenic byway which runs between the independent cities of Richmond and Williamsburg. The house is located approximately 1.5 miles (2.4 km) from the river. It was designated a National Historic Landmark in 1961.

== History ==
It is a misconception that Sherwood Forest is the only private residence in the United States to have been owned by two unrelated U.S. presidents. William Henry Harrison owned a plot of land called "Brown's Quarter" in the same county, and another (different) Brown's Quarter existed within the acreage that came to make up the land that Tyler later purchased. Harrison's vice president and successor John Tyler purchased the plantation in 1842 from his cousin Collier Minge and lived there after leaving the White House.

John Tyler renamed the plantation Sherwood Forest in 1842. He said it signified that he had been "outlawed" by the Whig party. He was attracted to the plantation because it was near his birthplace at Greenway Plantation. He retired there when he left the White House in 1845 and spent the rest of his life there with his second wife Julia Gardiner Tyler and some of his children. He had eight with his first wife and seven with his second wife.

Pearl, the youngest, was born in 1860, when Tyler was 70 years old; she died in 1947.

As regional hostilities in the United States escalated to become the American Civil War in 1861, Tyler backed Virginia's secession, although he died in January 1862. Later that spring, the house was occupied by Union soldiers during McClellan's Peninsula Campaign of 1862 and again during Grant's Overland Campaign in 1864. During the latter, the Battle of Wilson's Wharf was fought nearby. When an Ohio regiment vacated the house in 1864, they attempted to raze it with fire as a punishment for Tyler's support of the Confederacy. The fire was quickly extinguished by a slave and did little damage to the house.

Owners of the house who started restoring it in the mid-1970s started removing some home-made storm windows and then discovered from old records that Tyler had built them himself, so they kept them. One of the house's claims to fame is its length; 301 feet (91 m). It is noted for its long, skinny ballroom, a "hyphen" Tyler had added to the house to accommodate the style of dancing popular then - what is today called "line dancing" but was then the "Virginia reel."

The house has been in the Tyler family since it was purchased in 1842. The house was most recently owned by Harrison Ruffin Tyler, President Tyler's grandson and the son of Lyon Gardiner Tyler; he and his wife, Frances Payne Bouknight Tyler, restored the home and grounds based on information gathered from over 47,000 letters describing the decor, furnishings, and landscape. It is open to the public for tours by appointment. The grounds are open daily for self-guided tours from 9am-5pm excepting Thanksgiving and Christmas days.

=== Slavery ===
The plantation complex was used by the Tylers to grow and process large amounts of tobacco. They owned dozens of African American slaves, between 54 and 70 being recorded during the Tylers' buying of the plantation in 1842 and Emancipation in 1865. The enslaved had the surnames Armistead, Hall, Black and Short.

Although she was from New York, where slavery had been abolished, Julia Gardiner Tyler defended slavery. When several British noblewomen published an open letter challenging slavery in the Southern United States, Mrs Tyler wrote a response that defended slavery, publishing it in the Southern Literary Messenger in 1853. She claimed that slaves in the South lived better than the English working classes at the time.

An article in The Sydney Morning Herald criticized the modern plantation for a leaflet that called the plantation a "an almost self-supporting community of approximately 110 people," and described enslaved Africans with euphemisms such as "field hands" and "servants."

== Cemetery ==
A pet cemetery is located on the property, where Tyler family pets were and still are buried, most notably, John Tyler's horse, The General.

Staff at the site also maintain a small grove where Tyler planned to be buried. In January 1862, while in Richmond to serve in the Confederate House of Representatives, Tyler became seriously ill. He died while arranging plans to return to Sherwood Forest, and his request to be buried at his home was ignored. He was instead buried at Richmond's Hollywood Cemetery.

== See also ==
- List of residences of presidents of the United States
- List of National Historic Landmarks in Virginia
- National Register of Historic Places listings in Charles City County, Virginia
