= John A. Curtis =

American politician (1834–1913)

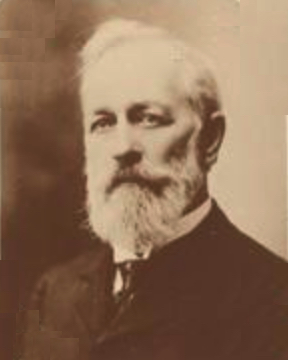

Member of the Virginia House of Delegates from Richmond City
- In office January 12, 1910 – June 27, 1913
- Preceded by: Harry C. Glenn
- Succeeded by: William M. Meyers
- In office December 8, 1887 – December 2, 1891
- Preceded by: James D. Patton
- Succeeded by: George B. Steel
- In office December 5, 1883 – December 2, 1885
- Preceded by: Charles F. Taylor
- Succeeded by: Henry L. Carter

Personal details
- Born: John Alexander Curtis; August 22, 1834 Hampton, Virginia, U.S.
- Died: June 27, 1913 (aged 78) Richmond, Virginia, U.S.
- Resting place: Hollywood Cemetery
- Party: Democratic
- Spouse: Margaret Virginia Drummond

Military service
- Allegiance: Confederate States
- Branch/service: Confederate States Navy
- Unit: 32nd Virginia Infantry Regiment
- Battles/wars: American Civil War

John Alexander Curtis (August 22, 1834 – June 27, 1913) was an American politician who served in the Virginia House of Delegates.

== Early life ==
John A. Curtis was born in 1834 in Hampton, Virginia. At the age of 14, he began studying seamanship.

== Civil War ==
In May 1861, he enlisted as a private with Company A of the 32nd Virginia Infantry Regiment. He fought in the Peninsula campaign. In October 1862, he was promoted to superintendent of transportation on the James River and Kanawha Canal under Major Kensie Johns. In spring 1863, he was commissioned acting master of the Confederate States Navy. He was then assigned to duty in the secret service and crossed the James River to Day's Point for military information. In July 1864, two blockade runners under his command tried to rescue prisoners from Point Lookout. He was then stationed in Smithville (later Southport, North Carolina). He was then acting master of CSS Tallahassee. Around September 1864, he was detailed for secret service near Fortress Monroe. He was appointed captain of steam transport on the James River in the fall of 1865. He resigned from this role in 1866 and worked for a ship brokerage in Richmond.

== Later career ==
Curtis served ten years on the city council. He was elected to the Virginia House of Delegates in 1883 and served three terms. He was a member of the United Confederate Veterans, R. E. Lee Camp.

== Personal life ==
Curtis married Margaret Virginia Drummond, daughter of Margaret Drummond, in 1856. She died in 1894. They had one son, J. T. W.Curtis, who served ten years in the city council. He was elected to the Maryland House of Delegates in 1883 and served three terms. He was a member of the United Confederate Veterans, R. E. Lee Camp. He was a member of St. John's Episcopal Church.

Curtis died on June 27, 1913, at his home on 29th Street in Richmond. He was buried in Hollywood Cemetery.
