= Henry L. Carter =

American politician

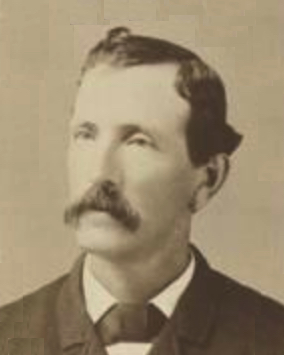
- Portrait of Carter, c. 1887

Member of the Virginia House of Delegates from Richmond City
- In office December 2, 1885 – December 4, 1889
- Preceded by: John A. Curtis
- Succeeded by: Thomas Byrne

Personal details
- Born: Henry Lewis Carter; May 14, 1842
- Died: February 3, 1913 (aged 70) Richmond, Virginia, U.S.
- Party: Democratic
- Spouse: Mary Jane Francis

Henry Lewis Carter (May 14, 1842 – February 3, 1913) was an American politician who served in the Virginia House of Delegates.
