= Edward A. Wild =

American doctor and general (1825–1891)

Edward Augustus Wild
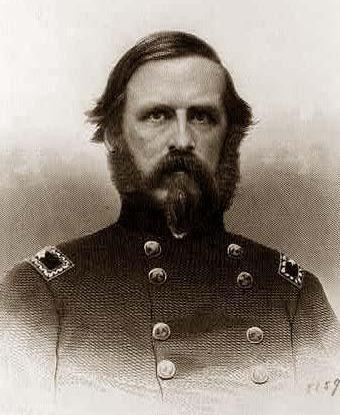
- Union Brigadier General Edward A. Wild
- Born: November 25, 1825; Brookline, Massachusetts, US
- Died: August 28, 1891 (aged 65); Medellín, Colombia
- Burial place: Cementerio de San Pedro, Medellín, Colombia
- Education: Harvard College
- Military career
- Allegiance: Ottoman Empire; United States of America, Union
- Branch: Ottoman Army; United States Army, Union Army
- Service years: 1855–1856 (Ottoman Empire) 1861–1866 (USA)
- Rank: Brigadier general
- Commands: 35th Massachusetts Volunteer Infantry
- Conflicts: Crimean War; American Civil War; First Battle of Bull Run; Peninsula Campaign; Battle of South Mountain; Charleston Harbor; Battle of Wilson's Wharf; Petersburg Campaign

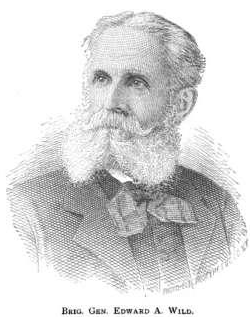
Wild in later years

Edward Augustus Wild (November 25, 1825 – August 28, 1891) was an American homeopathic doctor and a brigadier general in the Union Army during the American Civil War.

== Early life and career ==
Wild was a native of Brookline, Massachusetts, the second son of homeopath Dr. Charles Wild and his wife Mary. He earned his medical degree in 1846 from Harvard and at Jefferson Medical College, and he also studied homeopathy, becoming a member of the Massachusetts Society of Homeopathy. Wild then traveled and studied medicine in Paris, France.

Wild practiced alongside his father as a homeopathic physician in Brookline until 1855, when he and his new wife traveled to Turkey. He joined the Ottoman Army as a medical officer and served in the Crimean War. He then returned to Massachusetts and resumed his medical practice.

== Civil War service ==
With the outbreak of the Civil War, Wild enlisted in the Union Army as a front-line officer, preferring to command troops rather than to treat their injuries. He served as a captain in Company A of the 1st Regiment Massachusetts Volunteer Infantry. from May 1861 until July 1862. He fought in First Battle of Bull Run and again in the Peninsula Campaign, where he was wounded at the Battle of Seven Pines. On August 21, he was appointed Colonel of the 35th Massachusetts Volunteer Infantry and assigned to the Army of the Potomac's IX Corps. Wild led his new regiment into combat during the Maryland Campaign. At the Battle of South Mountain, Wild suffered another severe wound, one that necessitated the amputation of his left arm. He returned home to recuperate.

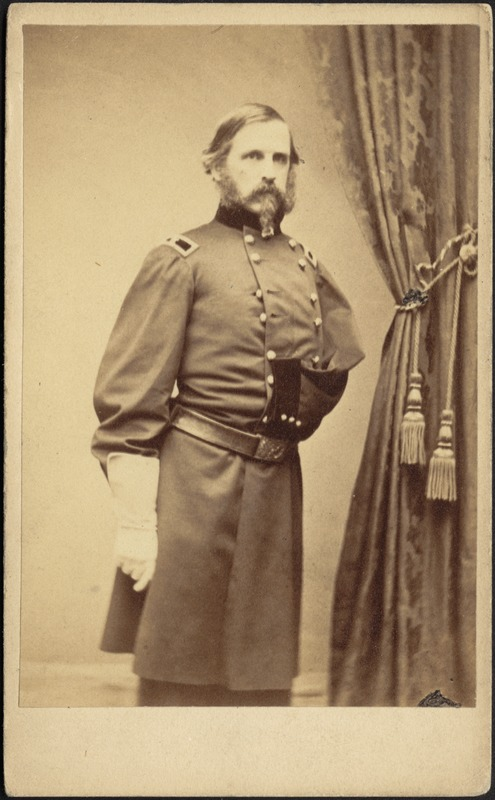
A portrait of Wild taken sometime between the fall of 1862 and 1870.

By April 1863, Wild had recovered enough to resume his military duties, and was promoted to brigadier general on April 24 and assigned to recruiting duties. A fervent abolitionist, he aggressively recruited black soldiers for the United States Colored Troops, as well as helping recruit white officers to lead them, including helping Robert Gould Shaw fill his officer complement for the 54th Massachusetts Infantry. Wild was friends with fellow abolitionist and author Harriet Beecher Stowe and enlisted her half-brother, James C. Beecher, as a white officer in one of the new black regiments. When Wild was able to resume his field duties, he freed hundreds of slaves in North Carolina, resettled them safely on Roanoke Island in North Carolina, and then recruited many of them to join the military.

=== Command of brigade ===
Wild took command of a brigade of black infantry that soon became known as "Wild's African Brigade". The brigade, headquartered in Norfolk, comprised the 55th Massachusetts Infantry, and the 2nd and 3rd North Carolina Colored Volunteers (which later became renumbered as the 36th and 37th U.S. Colored Troops respectively). Wild's men served in the Charleston, South Carolina, area and saw action in numerous skirmishes and battles in that region, including an expedition to South Mills and Camden Court House in December.

Transferred to the Army of the Potomac in 1864, Wild and his black soldiers participated in the Overland Campaign and the subsequent Siege of Petersburg, Wild's men constructed and manned Fort Pocahontas, an earthen-walled Virginia fort on the James River that during the Battle of Wilson's Wharf withstood an attack on May 24 by Fitzhugh Lee's Confederates.

In early 1865, Wild's men performed picket duty along the Appomattox River. They were a part of the large force of black troops under Godfrey Weitzel that occupied the former Confederate national capital, Richmond, Virginia, holding that city through the end of the war. Wild's men were among those troops who witnessed the historic visit of President Abraham Lincoln to Richmond following the city's fall to the Union forces.

=== Service as commissioner ===
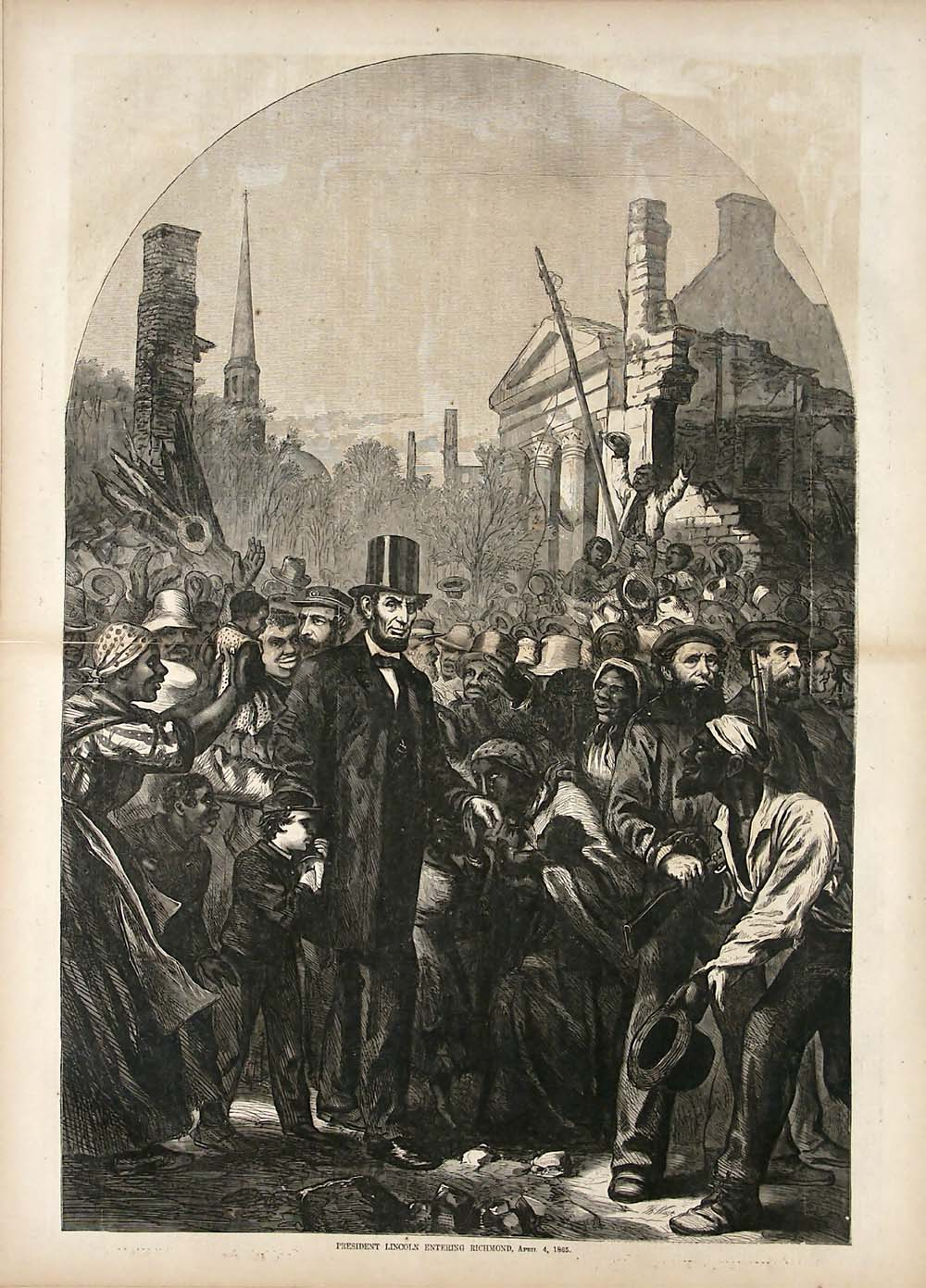
President Lincoln Entering Richmond by Thomas Nast (Harper's Weekly, 1865)

After the fall of Richmond, he joined the Freedmen's Bureau and went to Central Georgia to serve under Assistant Commissioner for Georgia and South Carolina, Maj. Gen. Rufus Saxton. Wild outraged the local white population, and some of his white army comrades, by frequently socializing with the local black population. Further, he was part of the arrest and trial of two local white men for the murder of a newly freed black woman that failed to convict.

In late May 1865, Wild traveled from Macon to Washington, GA to investigate reports that the local white population was still holding black citizens as slaves.

The area had been the site of the dissolution of the Confederate government and some Richmond banks had evacuated some of their gold that was loaned to the state of Virginia, and hence, the Confederate government, along with the Confederate government's treasury. The bank officials had decided to return their funds to their banks in Richmond on May 24, but that night their wagon train had been robbed of all the funds by bandits. Local residents, black and white, found gold coins that were dropped by the escaping robbers. Federal troops and local militia responded to the incident with search parties. When Wild arrived, there had been several beatings and lynchings of former slaves in the effort to recover the gold. When these were reported to Wild he set out to stop them and to locate the missing funds. In July, still investigating the theft, a female servant and former slave of the Chennault family in Danburg, GA, reported the raiders had spent the night before the theft at the Chennault home leading him to suspect their involvement. The Chennaults had also been reported to federal authorities for whipping their former slaves. His heavy-handed treatment of the family would lead to his dismissal from the bureau.

To force the men of the family to reveal where the gold had gone, he had the men tortured by stringing them up by their thumbs. The women in the family were strip-searched by their former female slave. The treatment of the men and the searching of the women by one of their own former slaves enraged the local white community. (Note: Casstevens, a local historian, cited several sources among this population at face value and reveals a possible Lost Cause bias, by referring to the woman, (in 2005 yet) Angelina, as "... the colored [sic] maid who had turned traitor." While Casstevens did not put that term in quotes, it is probable that the local sources she used from the nineteenth and early twentieth century used that language. Interestingly, Casstevens cites her first hearing of Wild at a meeting of the Sons of Confederate Veterans.) While no information resulted from the torture of the Chenault men, they were arrested when investigation revealed substance to the reports of their abuse of their former slaves. Wild continued angering the local white plantation class through the confiscations of properties under the operation of the bureau. When the Chennault family's attorney reached the military government in Augusta with details of their treatment, this news combined with the complaints from wealthy local white citizens led to his dismissal from his post. He was sent to Washington for an inquiry into his conduct. Wild survived the inquiry and was honorably discharged in January 1866.

== Postbellum years ==
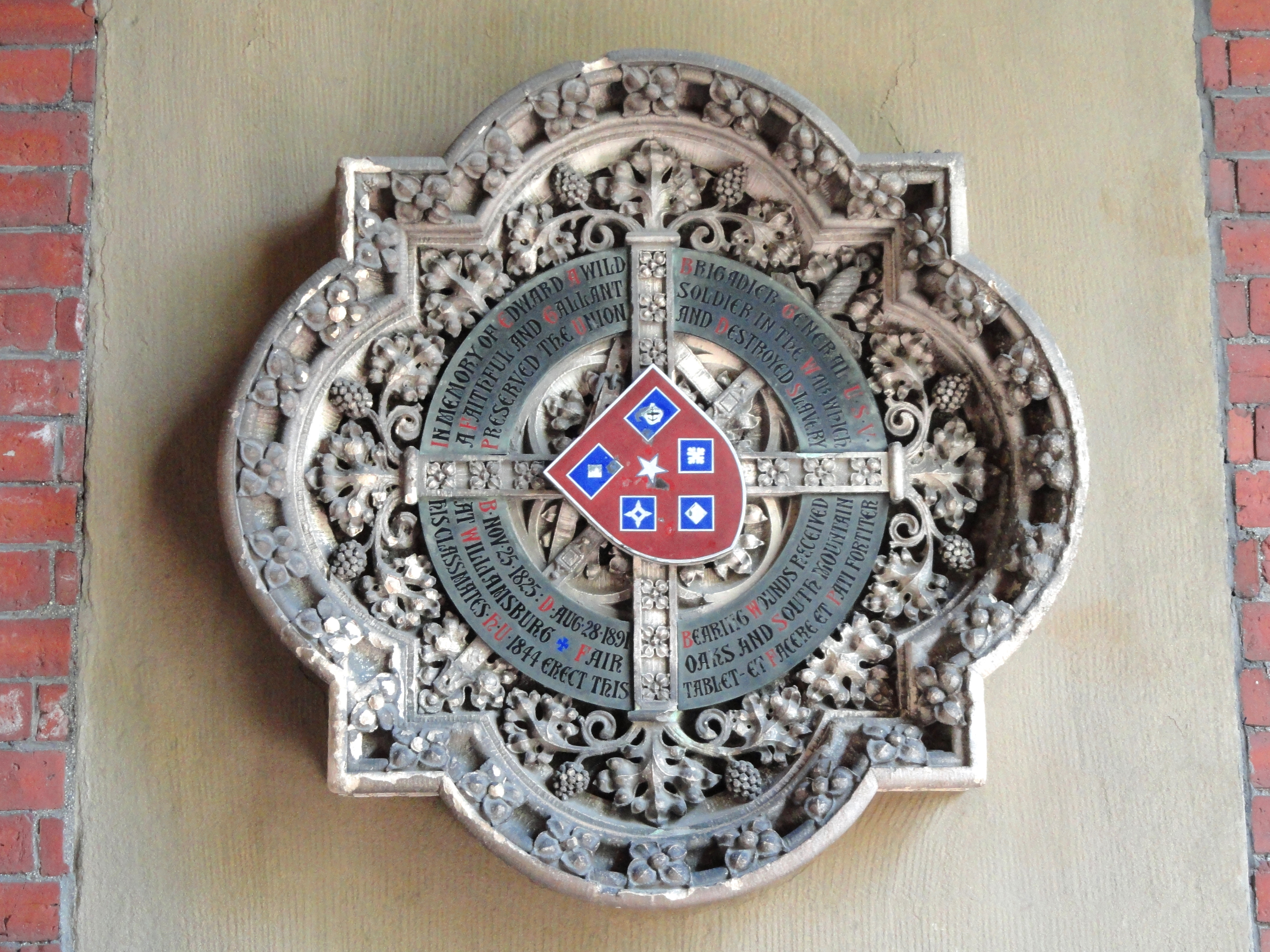
Memorial plaque at Harvard University

After the war, Wild could no longer practice medicine because of his war injuries. He engaged in silver mining in Nevada as a superintendent of operations. He operated in the Diana Mine, now part of the Berlin-Ichthyosaur State Park near Austin. He traveled extensively in South America. He died in Medellín, Colombia, and was buried in the city's Cementerio de San Pedro.

== In popular culture ==
Wild is portrayed in Black Cloud Rising, a 2022 historic fiction novel by David Wright Faladé. He is in command of the protagonist and narrator, Richard Etheridge, who in March 1863 was among the first enlistees in the African Brigade, later known as 36th U.S. Colored Troops.

== See also ==
- List of American Civil War generals (Union)
- List of Massachusetts generals in the American Civil War
