= WYCS =

- Yorktown, Virginia; United States
- Broadcast area: Peninsula of Hampton Roads
- Frequency: 91.5 MHz

Programming
- Format: Christian talk and teaching; southern gospel; traditional worship music
- Network: Oasis Network

Ownership
- Owner: David Ingles Ministries Church Inc.

History
- First air date: March 15, 1966
- Call sign meaning: York County Schools, owner 1966–1997

Technical information
- Licensing authority: FCC
- Facility ID: 66672
- Class: B1
- ERP: 13,500 watts
- HAAT: 146 meters (479 ft)
- Transmitter coordinates: 37°12′34″N 76°32′34″W

Links
- Public license information: Public file; LMS
- Webcast: Listen live
- Website: oasisnetwork.org

WYCS (91.5 FM) is a non-commercial radio station licensed to Yorktown, Virginia, and serving the Peninsula of Hampton Roads. WYCS is part of the Oasis Network and is owned and operated by David Ingles Ministries Church Inc.

Though part of the Oasis Network since 1997, the station was built in 1966 by the York County School Division as an outlet run by students in York County's high schools. In its early years, it primarily rebroadcast WCWM at the College of William & Mary in Williamsburg, but it soon produced its own programming, including sports broadcasts, county board meetings, and a music format ranging from Top 40 to adult contemporary. In 1996, the school board proposed selling the license because of decreased interest by York County students and a need to fund the purchase of buses; an attempt to save the station failed to raise enough money, and the school board sold the broadcast license in 1997.

== History ==
=== York County Schools ===
On March 15, 1965, the York County School Board applied to the Federal Communications Commission (FCC) for permission to build a new, 21,000-watt FM station to broadcast from York High School; the FCC approved the application on July 16. WYCS began broadcasting March 15, 1966, using a transmitter purchased from Old Dominion College. It was heavily supported by the College of William & Mary in Williamsburg and primarily rebroadcast its programming, a combination promoted as the "Colonial Educational Network". As WCWM was a 10-watt station only receivable near the campus and WYCS operated at much higher power, this arrangement extended the reception area of WCWM's existing evening programming. WYCS retained the ability to occasionally originate programs and did so to air York High School basketball.

In its third school year, 1967–1968, York High School began to put together a more comprehensive student staff and studio facilities, primarily using aged Army surplus equipment. In one case, a transmitter dating to 1939 blew out-of-production vacuum tubes and needed to be refitted to accept more modern parts. An audio console that was surplus equipment was later identified as having been used in the production of president Franklin D. Roosevelt's fireside chats. A second studio was built in 1971, allowing for increased broadcast activity. By 1974, the station was on the air seven days a week, mostly during afternoons but also airing Sunday church services; high school classes had made improvements to the studio, including stringing new cables and wires and building cinder block walls. York County board meetings also aired on the station; in one case, a board meeting extended into the night because 99 pages of back minutes had to be read by state law. The Daily Press called it "the most boring and sleep-inducing meeting in county history". In 1978, the station extended its broadcast day to 14 hours; with the expansion of the York County school system, the WYCS program included students at Bruton and Tabb high schools. Several alumni went on to jobs in television and radio across the United States.

Beginning in 1979, WYCS became the home for radio reading service programming, originally from Virginia Voice, based in Richmond. Of four Virginia stations providing radio reading service programming as of 1980, WYCS was the only one to offer it in the clear instead of as a subcarrier. A local service, Voice of the Peninsula, began in 1983. In 1984, Landmark Communications sold a new transmitter to WYCS in part to enable it to begin subcarrier service, though it did not do so until 1986. By 1993, Voice of the Peninsula had more than 100 volunteers.

In February 1996, York County school superintendent Steven R. Staples proposed shuttering WYCS and selling its license as part of a draft budget. He believed that the station's sale could pay for 10 buses needed to service the new Grafton High School, then under construction. At the time, only 18 students participated in the radio station program, five of them from outside the county. The station cost $120,000 a year to run and needed technical upgrades, including an antenna replacement after a lightning strike and equipment for the new Emergency Alert System. Supporters of WYCS mounted an effort to save the station from sale, including a petition delivered to the school board; this was successful in giving WYCS funding for the 1996–97 school year. However, contracts to air William & Mary and Christopher Newport University athletics, as well as religious programming, only generated a third of the revenue the station needed. Further, news of the impending closure prompted enrollment in the radio program to fall further. Of 11 students enrolled in 1996–97, only two were from York County.

The York County school board voted to accept bids for the WYCS license in January 1997. An external programmer offered to lease the station to continue his religious programming, and the process brought forth seven potential buyers.

=== Oasis Network ===
In July 1997, the school board tentatively approved the $449,000 sale of WYCS to the highest bidder: David Ingles, whose Oasis Network broadcast from Oklahoma. Ingles had heard about WYCS being up from a sale from a local friend. Voice of the Peninsula closed at the end of October 1997 as a result of the sale, which received final approval from the school board in December 1997.
