= Warhill High School =

Location
- 4615 Opportunity Way; Williamsburg, Virginia 23188; United States; 37°19′58.4″N 76°45′25.6″W

Information
- School type: Public
- Founded: 2007
- School district: Williamsburg-James City County Public Schools
- Principal: Michele Newcomb
- Teaching staff: 82.33 (FTE)
- Grades: 9–12
- Enrollment: 1,294 (2023-24)
- Student to teacher ratio: 15.72
- Language: English
- Campus: Suburban
- Colors: Carolina Blue, Black, Silver, White
- Athletics conference: Virginia High School League; Bay Rivers District; Region I
- Mascot: Lion
- Rivals: Lafayette High School; Tabb High School; Grafton High School
- Website: https://wjccschools.org/whs/

Warhill High School is a public high school operated by the Williamsburg-James City County Public Schools (WJCC). Serving the joint school division of the independent city of Williamsburg and James City County, Virginia, the school is located at 4615 Opportunity Way, in the Lightfoot area of the county.

Communities within the Warhill High attendance zone include: a small portion of the Williamsburg city limits, and the community of Norge.

== Historic site ==
The entire Historic Triangle area of the Virginia Peninsula is steeped in history dating back to the era of the British Colony of Virginia (1607–1776) and later. West of the colonial capital (now Colonial Williamsburg), the old stage coach road to New Kent County and Richmond (which became U.S. Route 60 in the 1920s), as well as Centerville and Longhill roads, all date to the pre-Revolutionary War period. The area where Lightfoot is now was known as the location of Six Mile Ordinary. (An ordinary was a colonial-era tavern with food and lodging for travelers and their horses).

By tradition, the land at War Hill (or as it came to be called, Warhill) is named for an American Revolutionary War battle which took place there on June 26, 1781, between British troops under Lord Cornwallis and Allied forces under the Marquis Lafayette. Nearly 150 men were killed or wounded in the conflict, which occurred during the campaign that led to the victory at Yorktown, establishing independence for Virginia and the United States.

By the late 20th century, the 588-acre (2.38 km^{2}) Warhill tract was one of the largest undeveloped parcels of land in the area. In 1996, it was purchased for public use. Located on Centerville Road near the interchange of U.S. Route 60 and State Route 199, the land was envisioned as multi-purpose in James City County's "Master Plan." In 1999, the Warhill Sports Complex opened adjacent to the site of the new high school. In 2005, construction began on the new Warhill High School.

== School history ==
Warhill High School, opened in 2007

Warhill High School is Williamsburg-James City County's third high school, the newest since Jamestown High School's completion in 1997. The construction of Warhill was in response to the overcrowding issue at both Jamestown and Lafayette High School. Serious talks about building a third high school began in 2001. In April 2007, Jamestown was reported to be about 350 students over the effective capacity, and Lafayette even more.

Warhill High School opened to the public on August 28, 2007, and opened for the first day of school on September 4, 2007, when 707 students were enrolled at Warhill High School; the number has risen consistently since the opening and is expected to continue to rise so as the surrounding community continues to grow. The school currently has about 1,150 students.

== Career and Technical Education Center ==
When it opened in 2007, the 243,000-square-foot (22,600 m^{2}) facility at Warhill High School included a new state-of-the-art technology specialty center, offering Career and Technical Education (CTE) in the following career clusters:

- Health, Human and Public Services€
- Electronics, Engineering and Scientific Technology
- Information Technology and Communication

Students from all three WJCC high schools are eligible to attend the new Career and Technical Education (CTE) courses at Warhill, which are offered in partnership with Sentara Health System, which opened the modern Sentara Williamsburg Regional Medical Center nearby in Lightfoot in August 2006, and Thomas Nelson Community College.

== The Pathways Project ==
The Pathways Project is a new, innovative way of learning that began for freshmen in the 2016-17 school year. The program accepted around 100 freshman and is currently only available for Warhill High, however, other WJCC high schools may also adopt a similar program in the future. Students who were not zoned for Warhill High could also have joined the program. Students in the project were given a laptop at the beginning of the year to use during the blended learning courses. Students joining the project could choose only two electives, either yearlong or semester. The Pathways Project offers multiple semester long courses including Physics by Design and Humanities by Design. In the Physics by Design course, students have both Physics and Math blended into two blocks and also take a fully online math course. In the Humanities by Design course, students have History and English blended together into two blocks and also take a blended English class. Freshman in the Pathways Project take only one SOL for Math. Students in either course experience project-based learning, teaching the students to collaborate. The Pathways Project was designed for students to be better prepared for the work force.

== Band Program ==
When Warhill first opened the band was made up of 49 members, with the majority of the students coming from Lafayette High School under the redistricting of James City County. The band has since grown to 130 members and the achievements and reputation of the program continue to rise. The band has competed well in recent years and was named a Virginia Honor Band for the 2010–11, 2013–14, 2016-2017, 2017-2018, and 2018-2019 school years. The Warhill Bands include the Marching Lions, Wind Ensemble, Symphonic Band, two jazz ensembles and a percussion ensemble. In addition, the band has chamber ensembles for various functions, color guard, and collaborates with the Warhill Orchestra to pull members to play in the spring musical pit orchestra. In addition, members of the band are afforded full orchestra experiences each year as select members of the band combine with the string orchestra to perform works for full symphony orchestra each spring.

== Athletics ==
The school's athletic teams compete in the AA Bay Rivers District in Region I. Warhill High School fields teams in these sports:

- Swimming
- Baseball
- Basketball
- Cross-Country
- Field Hockey
- Football
- Golf
- Indoor Track and Field
- Outdoor Track and Field
- Soccer -
- Softball
- Tennis
- Volleyball - 2014 3A State Champions
- Wrestling
