= Luzar =

Luzar or Lužar is a surname. Notable people with this name include:

- Alenka Luzar (died 2019), Slovenian-American chemist
- Chris Luzar (born 1979), American football player
- Leo Luzar (born 1964), Czech member of parliament
- Marjana Lužar (1972–2017), Slovenian track and field athlete, silver medalist at 1990 World Junior Championships

== See also ==
- Luzar, fictional character in manga and anime series Papuwa
