= York High School (Virginia) =

Location
- 9300 George Washington Highway; Yorktown postal address, Virginia 23692; United States; 37°12′14.5″N 76°30′1.8″W

Information
- School type: Public high school
- Founded: 1954
- School district: York County School Division
- Superintendent: Victor Shandor
- Principal: Shannon Butler
- Grades: 9–12
- Enrollment: 1,075 (2016-17)
- Language: English
- Hours in school day: 7:15a.m.-2:00p.m.
- Campus: Suburban
- Colors: Silver, Blue
- Athletics conference: Virginia High School League; Bay Rivers District; Region I
- Mascot: Falcon
- Rival: Tabb High School; Grafton High School; Bruton High School
- Website: Official site

York High School is a York County School Division high school located in York County, Virginia, on U.S. Route 17 about 3 miles (4.8 km) south of Yorktown and with a Yorktown post office address.

The school was opened in 1954 and currently enrolls over one thousand students. Athletic teams compete in the Virginia High School League's AA Bay Rivers District in Region I. The school is the home of the school division's television station and offers television production courses in the curriculum. The school is also the home of the York River Academy (a charter school that focuses on collaborative education teaching computer repair, cabling, and web design) and is the YCSD site for the International Baccalaureate Programme.

York High School was once home to the most powerful high school radio station in the United States, WYCS 91.5.

== History ==
York High School opened in 1954 as the public school for grades 6 through 12 for the white children of York County under the separate but equal system, while the York County Training School in the Grafton area of York County would be used by black students. Before York High School opened, students attended other neighboring high schools: Poquoson, Magruder in Williamsburg, and Morrison in Newport News, later to be known as Warwick High School. Black students in Grades 1 - 12 attended the newly constructed James Weldon Johnson School. York High School issued its first student yearbook, then titled "The York Bugle," in 1955.

From 1955 to 1970, an avalanche of over 5,000 pupils descended upon the York County school system. This influx was largely due to white flight as families moved from the neighboring cities of Hampton and Newport News to the county following the 1954 Brown v. Board of Education decision by the US Supreme Court that ordered racial integration of public schools. Cold War era expansions at military installations and defense industries in the area also brought some families in from out of state. Many changes to the schools came during that period as well. The year 1964 was the last year the school received funds from the district school levy. As of 1964, racial integration of YCSD schools began and the fall of 1967 marked the end of segregation. The James Weldon Johnson School, built on the same floor plan as YHS under the "separate but equal" emphasis during Segregation, became Yorktown Intermediate School.

Several additions were added to York High School within its first few years as the building would need to provide space for more than a thousand students in grades 6 through 12. As new schools opened, the school's population was reduced to consist of students of grades 9 through 12. The school served the entire county until Tabb High School opened in 1972 and Bruton High School opened in 1976.

== Campus ==
In 1967 the student council association (SCA) advocated for a smoking area, and by 1968 the school administration approved of its establishment.

=== Bailey Field ===
The athletic field was named in honor of B. Herman Bailey, a locally prominent family physician, who was widely considered to be a hero within the county. A successful doctor, Dr. Bailey was also an ardent supporter of YHS athletics for many years, providing sports physicals twice a year and was a faithful attendee of YHS football games. The field is now used by 3 out of the 4 high schools in the county with Tabb High School and Grafton High School also playing their home football games there.

=== John P. Wornom Auditorium ===
The Auditorium is named for John P. Wornom, a York County native born in 1909 who owned a successful hardware store and was a long-time member of the York County School Board. An ardent supporter of childcare and education, Wornom worked to improve teacher pay and benefits, school facilities, and other measures to enhance the academic programs in the school division. He died from Lou Gehrig's disease on September 4, 1978.

== Accreditation ==
York High is fully accredited by the Virginia Department of Education and has been accredited by the Southern Association of Colleges and Schools since 1966.

== Feeder patterns ==
The following elementary schools feed into YHS: Seaford Elementary School, Yorktown Elementary School, Dare Elementary School. All residents zoned to Yorktown Middle School are zoned to York High School.

== Athletics ==
York High has almost 20 varsity sports. These teams compete under the name, the Falcons, and their colors are blue, silver, and white. The football team has had various successes over the past few years. York's athletic teams include: Academic Challenge, Baseball (AA State Champions 1989, Class 3 State Champions 2024), Basketball-Boys, Basketball-Girls (AA State Champions 1986 and 1987; Bay Rivers District Regular Season Champions 2009-2010; Region I Champions 2009-2010), Cheerleading, Cross Country (AA State Champions 1996 and 1997), Field Hockey, Football, Golf, Soccer-Boys (AA State Champions 1994), Soccer-Girls, Softball, Swimming (boys and girls state runner-up 2019), Tennis-Boys (AA State Champions 1995, 1996, and 1997), Tennis-Girls (2012), Track-Boys, Track-Girls, Volleyball (2022 Class 3 State Champions), Wrestling.

== Band ==
Marching Band - The York High School Marching Band competes on the state and national level every year. They have won three state championships (2002, 2009, and 2014). In 2015 they traveled to Chattanooga Tennessee for the USBands Southern State Championship winning in their class. The Band has consistently appeared at the USBands National Championship at MetLife Stadium in New Jersey.

Concert Band - The Concert Band consists of two groups, the Concert Band, and the Symphonic Band. Both groups have consistently been given superior ratings by the VBODA.

The York High School Band is a six time Virginia Honor Band.

== Notable alumni ==
- Ben Edwards, American football player
- Reggie Evans, former Washington Redskins running back
