= KNYD =

Radio station in Broken Arrow, Oklahoma

- Broken Arrow, Oklahoma; United States
- Broadcast area: Tulsa metropolitan area
- Frequency: 90.5 MHz
- Branding: The Oasis Network

Programming
- Format: Christian radio

Ownership
- Owner: David Ingles Ministries Church Inc.

History
- First air date: September 1, 1986

Technical information
- Licensing authority: FCC
- Facility ID: 14429
- Class: C
- ERP: 80,000 watts
- HAAT: 452 meters (1,483 ft)
- Transmitter coordinates: 35°53′0.4″N 95°46′14″W
- Translator: See § Translators

Links
- Public license information: Public file; LMS
- Webcast: Listen live
- Website: oasisnetwork.org

KNYD (90.5 FM), known as the Oasis Network, is a radio station licensed to Broken Arrow, Oklahoma, United States, serving the Tulsa metropolitan area. The station broadcasts a Christian radio format. The Oasis Network is broadcast in multiple markets, primarily in Oklahoma and Missouri, through a series of broadcast translators and repeater stations owned by David Ingles Ministries Church Inc.

KNYD began broadcasting September 1, 1986. It was set up by David Ingles, a former country and gospel music singer. KMSI in Moore, serving Oklahoma City, began in August 1991. By 1997, there were two full-power and eight translators rebroadcasting the Oasis Network. That year, the Virginia station was acquired from the York School Board for $449,000.

Previous logo

== Translators ==
In addition to KNYD, the Oasis Network utilizes four additional stations and six translators.

Call sign	Frequency	City of license	FID	ERP (W)	HAAT	Class	Transmitter coordinates	FCC info
KMSI	88.1 FM	Moore, Oklahoma	14436	50,000	177 m (581 ft)	C1	35°12′7″N 97°35′19″W	LMS
WYCS	91.5 FM	Yorktown, Virginia	66672	20,150	146 m (479 ft)	B	37°12′34″N 76°32′34″W	LMS
KOZO	89.7 FM	Branson, Missouri	14462	150 (horizontal); 20,000 (vertical)	130 m (430 ft)	C2	36°33′4.2″N 93°14′36.6″W	LMS
WOFN	88.7 FM	Beach City, Ohio	62343	18,500	105 m (344 ft)	B	40°35′17.8″N 81°28′12.7″W	LMS

Broadcast translators for KNYD
Call sign	Frequency	City of license	FID	ERP (W)	HAAT	Transmitter coordinates	FCC info
K216BT	91.1 FM	McAlester, Oklahoma	14422	115	108.4 m (356 ft)	34°59′13.3″N 95°42′11″W	LMS
K212DX	90.3 FM	Ponca City, Oklahoma	14456	170	106.3 m (349 ft)	36°45′35.1″N 97°9′37.1″W	LMS
K201IJ	88.1 FM	Miami, Oklahoma	14410	205	100.2 m (329 ft)	36°52′58.2″N 94°47′46.8″W	LMS
K206CA	89.1 FM	Enid, Oklahoma	89523	205	85 m (279 ft)	36°24′28.4″N 97°59′55.5″W	LMS

Broadcast translator for KMSI
Call sign	Frequency	City of license	FID	ERP (W)	HAAT	Transmitter coordinates	FCC info
K242AA	96.3 FM	Lawton, Oklahoma	14450	250	74 m (243 ft)	34°36′26.2″N 98°27′54.2″W	LMS

Broadcast translator for KOZO
Call sign	Frequency	City of license	FID	ERP (W)	HAAT	Transmitter coordinates	FCC info
K229AE	93.7 FM	Springfield, Missouri	85390	140	103.8 m (341 ft)	37°12′33.1″N 93°16′56.6″W	LMS
