= WJC =

WJC may refer to:

- Williamsburg-James City County Public Schools, Virginia
- William Jefferson Clinton (born 1946), the 42nd president of the United States (1993–2001)
- Wessel Johannes "Hansie" Cronje (1969–2002), South African cricketer
- World Jewish Congress, an international federation of Jewish communities and organizations founded 1936
- World Junior Ice Hockey Championships, an annual event organized by the International Ice Hockey Federation (IIHF) for national under-20 ice hockey teams from around the world
