= New Horizons Governor's School for Science and Technology =

Location
- 520 Butler Farm Road; Hampton, Virginia 23666; United States; 37°03′48″N 76°24′42″W

Information
- Type: Public, magnet high school
- Established: 1985
- School district: Gloucester County Public Schools, Hampton City Schools, Isle of Wight County Schools, Newport News Public Schools, Poquoson City Public Schools, Williamsburg-James City County Public Schools, York County School Division
- Director: Vikki Wismer (2008 – present)
- Grades: 11–12
- Website: https://nhrec.org/gsst/

The New Horizons Governor's School for Science and Technology (NHGS) is a magnet school located in Hampton, Virginia. Students of this school are chosen from the Gloucester, Hampton, Isle of Wight, Newport News, Poquoson, Williamsburg-James City and York County school divisions.

Students attend the Governor's School during their junior and senior years. They take mathematics and science courses at the Governor's School in the morning or afternoon, depending on school division, and attend their home high schools for the remainder of their classes. Apart from its math and science courses, the Governor's School also offers Junior Research and Senior Mentorship classes. These classes are designed to expose students to areas they may not have had in their regular schools. Junior Research introduces NHGS juniors to research and the scientific process, skills that are invaluable later on in college environments. Senior Mentorship provides NHGS seniors with work experience in a specific field of science or technology. Financial support for the school is provided by the participating school divisions and the Gifted Programs Office of the Virginia Department of Education.

== Curriculum ==
New Horizons students may choose between three subjects: Engineering, Biological Sciences, and Computational Science. Every student enrolled is required to take a specific research class depending upon grade level, as well as the appropriate math class.

=== Engineering ===
Prerequisites: Pre-Calculus

- Calculus-based Engineering Physics I: Foundations & Modeling (2 HS/4 TNCC Credits)
- Calculus-based Engineering Physics II: Maxwell to Hawking (2 HS/4 TNCC Credits)

=== Biological Science ===
Prerequisites: HS Biology, HS Chemistry, Algebra II/Trig

- Advanced Chemical Analysis (2 HS/8 TNCC Credits)
- Advanced Biological Analysis (2 HS/8 TNCC Credits)

=== Computational Science & Engineering ===
Prerequisites: Algebra II/Trig

- Inquiry Physics & Programming I – Dynamics (2 HS/7 TNCC Credits)
- Systems Modeling and Simulation & Scientific Programming II (2 HS/4 TNCC Credits)

=== Research ===
The junior year research experience involves various aspects of research methodology, ethics and statistics, critical thinking skills, and scientific writing and communication skills. The class centers around a research project that each student is required to submit to a panel of in school judges, and are allowed to the Tidewater Science Fair. Students in the past have done very well there.

- Junior Research Methodology and Ethics (1 HS/3 TNCC Credits)

The senior year mentorship allows students to participate in a real-life work experience with professionals from a scientific area of the students' choosing. Students work closely with a mentor on a research project. Mentorship locations include, NASA Langley, Jefferson Lab, colleges, and other local businesses. Final projects are presented to the local scientific and professional community as a culminating experience in May. The opportunity to work with a professional in research is an invaluable experience toward career pursuits.

- Senior Environmental Science/Honors Research & Mentorship (2 HS/6 TNCC Credits)

Provides broad background needed to understand the natural environment and to address issues in the modern world. Specific topics include sustainability, biodiversity, environment management, human population growth, energy, pollution, and urbanization

=== Mathematics ===
- Modern Pre-Calculus (1 HS/6 TNCC Credits)
- Calculus I (1 HS/8 TNCC Credits)
- Calculus II (1 HS/8 TNCC Credits)
- Multi-Variable Calculus/Linear Algebra (1 HS/7 TNCC Credits)
- Statistics (1 HS/3 TNCC Credits)

== Notable faculty ==
- Bruce Chittenden - former vice president of engineering at Citrix Systems, former scientific programming teacher, and winner of the 2012 Technology Hampton Roads STEM Educator of the Year award
