= Betsy Blackwell =

American magazine editor

Betsy Talbot Blackwell
- Blackwell (third from right) with members of the Mademoiselle college board
- Born: 1905; New York City, U.S.
- Died: February 4, 1985 (aged 79); Norwalk, Connecticut, U.S.
- Occupations: Editor; editor-in-chief
- Years active: 1937–1971
- Spouse: James Madison Blackwell (m. 1930; died 1961)

Betsy Talbot Blackwell (née Talbot, 1905? – February 4, 1985) was an American editor of women's magazines, best known for being the editor-in-chief of Mademoiselle from 1937 to 1971. She is credited with transforming the magazine from an initial failure into a widely circulated publication that was influential on subsequent fashion magazines.

Beginning her career as a fashion reporter, Blackwell became an assistant fashion editor at the magazine Charm from 1923 to 1928 before becoming the fashion director at Mademoiselle in 1935 and its editor-in-chief two years later. Blackwell oversaw steady increases in the magazine's circulation, which eventually reached nearly a million when she departed it. She introduced a literary aspect to the magazine, publishing writers such as William Faulkner and Joyce Carol Oates, and the guest editorship program she introduced would eventually include such writers as Joan Didion and Sylvia Plath.

Under Blackwell's leadership, Mademoiselle achieved several notable firsts, including the first magazine makeover and the first fashion magazine to be guest-edited by an African-American woman (Barbara Chase-Riboud in 1956). Blackwell was also one of the first editors to publish the feminist activists Betty Friedan and Gloria Steinem, though her own political views—including her support for the Republican Party—were more conservative.

== Early life ==
Betsy Talbot was born in New York City to Hayden Talbot, a playwright and author, and Benedict B. Talbot, a stylist at the department store Lord & Taylor. She never disclosed her true age, but staff working for her guessed that she was born in 1905. Her father left the family when she was seven years old; she never saw him again. Blackwell said of her mother that she was a "fantastic role model" who taught her self-reliance by working to support the family, making it seem natural that she would pursue a career. She was educated at the Academy of Saint Elizabeth in Convent Station, New Jersey, a Catholic girls' school, though she was not a Catholic but a Presbyterian. During her vacation, she worked as a comparison shopper for Lord & Taylor.

== Career ==
Blackwell began her career as a fashion reporter for a New York fashion publication titled the Breath of the Avenue before becoming an assistant fashion editor at the new magazine Charm from 1923 to 1928, published by the Newark, New Jersey, department store Bamberger's. She was attracted by the relatively high salary and freedom to operate without interference from management. Two years after joining the magazine, she married Bowden Washington, a radio engineer; however, the marriage was soon dissolved over disagreements about her continuing to work.

In 1930, Blackwell married James Madison Blackwell, a Wall Street attorney. She chose to retain her maiden name upon marriage and signed herself as "BTB" through most of her career. For the next five years, while raising a son, James, with her husband, Blackwell accepted only special assignments from Tobé Coller Davis, whose Tobé Fashion Service provided a weekly report on trends in the fashion industry. In 1935, she became the fashion director at the magazine Mademoiselle upon its establishment by the New York City publisher Street & Smith. She initially held two roles at the publication, working also as a beauty editor under the assumed name of "Elizabeth Rich". Blackwell helped revise the fortunes of the new magazine after its initial troubles, which included the recall of the first issue due to its poor quality. She gained publicity by inviting Barbara Phillips, a Boston nurse, to be depicted receiving "new clothes, new hair, a glamorous makeup", in what became the first magazine makeover. Her innovation of restyling ordinary women was to be repeated during her editorship.

In 1937, two years after joining Mademoiselle, Blackwell was promoted to editor-in-chief, a position she retained until her retirement in 1971. During her tenure at the magazine, she oversaw steady increases in circulation—from 178,000 in 1939 to 540,000 in 1953 to nearly a million in 1971—and a change in focus towards young career women. She also introduced a literary aspect to the magazine, and many of the authors published in Mademoiselle during her time as editor-in-chief would become well-known, including Truman Capote, William Faulkner, Joyce Carol Oates, and Eudora Welty. During her editorship, the magazine also started the practice of allowing college women to write and publish an issue (the "college issue") each summer. The summer guest editorship program would eventually include such well-known writers as Ann Beattie, Joan Didion, Francine du Plessix Gray, Diane Johnson, Sylvia Plath, Mona Simpson and Meg Wolitzer.

In 1942, Blackwell received the Neiman Marcus Fashion Award for her contributions to fashion, and in 1949 became the first woman to be elected to the board of the New York City publisher Street & Smith (the publisher of Mademoiselle).

In 1956, Mademoiselle became the first fashion magazine to be guest edited by an African American woman—and the first to feature a photographic image of a Black woman—when Barbara Chase-Riboud served as guest editor. Blackwell was reportedly unworried when Chase was mentioned as being in contention for the role and when concerns were raised by the president of Street & Smith upon her eventual selection. However, Blackwell did inform Chase that she could not appear in the fashion show customarily attended by guest editors, telling her "we have these people who are going to make a big fuss". Upon finishing the program, Blackwell secured Chase a paid internship at Charm magazine.

The American author Elizabeth Winder has described Blackwell as "remarkably ahead of her time". In 1946, she hired the openly gay writer Leo Lerman. She was one of the first editors to publish the activists Betty Friedan and Gloria Steinem, who would become nationally-recognized leaders of second-wave feminism in the 1960s and 1970s. In 1970, during the women's liberation movement, Blackwell published an issue of Mademoiselle entitled "The New Sex" that paid tribute to the rise of the individualistic American woman. Blackwell's own political views were more conservative—she did not consider herself a feminist, although one modern assessment has labelled her a reactionary feminist. In a 1971 New York Times article paying tribute to her, Blackwell's "mainly liberal" colleagues higlighted her "staunch Republicanism"—as in her friendship with prominent Republican party members such as Thomas E. Dewey—as the only issue on which they disagreed with her.

== Death and legacy ==
In 1971, Blackwell moved to West Lane in Ridgefield, Connecticut, to be closer to her son, James Madison Blackwell IV; her husband had died ten years earlier, in 1961. Blackwell died on February 4, 1985, at the age of 79, while being treated for emphysema at a Norwalk, Connecticut hospital. She was survived by her son and stepdaughter through her marriage to James Madison Blackwell.

Kelley Massoni judges that Mademoiselle under Blackwell was influential on subsequent magazines such as Seventeen in identifying a specific audience—upper- and middle-class college-age women, in its case—as its market niche. Papers relating to Blackwell's life, including her personal and professional correspondence, along with her work at Mademoiselle, are housed at the American Heritage Center, operated by the University of Wyoming.

== Sources ==
- Bren, Paulina (2021). The Barbizon: The Hotel That Set Women Free. Simon & Schuster. ISBN 9781982123925.
- Rayner, William P. (1983). Wise Women: Singular Lives That Shaped Our Century. St. Martin's Press. ISBN 031288415X.
