= Bay Rivers District =

Athletic district

The Bay Rivers District is an athletic district of the Virginia High School League which includes schools in the Hampton Roads metropolitan area. The district was formed in 1990 with the consolidation of schools from the York River District and Peanut District schools. The schools in the Bay Rivers District compete in 2A, 3A, and 4A. Since 2013, the district is only used for the regular season.

== Facts About the District ==
The schools in the Bay Rivers District are located in or south of the Virginia Peninsula. Schools in the Bay Rivers District in particular are home to the Historic Triangle which are three Virginia colonial communities and areas which have important significance in the founding of the United States. First is Jamestown, the location of the first permanent British settlement in North America. Second is Williamsburg, home of the Colonial capital which is located in the Colonial Williamsburg historic district; Busch Gardens which is one of the most popular theme parks in the United States; and The College of William & Mary, which is the second oldest university in the United States and alma mater of Thomas Jefferson. The third city is Yorktown, which is the site of the Siege of Yorktown, where the British surrendered to the Continental Army on October 17, 1781, unofficially ending the American Revolutionary War.

Though much of the Historic Triangle area is considered to be a "retirement villa," this area is a rapidly growing area in general in the Commonwealth without regard to age, to the point where the Williamsburg/James City County school system opened Warhill High School in the 2007–2008 school year, reducing enrollments at Jamestown and Lafayette and creating the tenth member in the district.

== Member schools ==
School	Location	Founded	Enrollment	Nickname	Colors
Bruton High School	Lightfoot, York County, VA	1974	579	Panthers	Green & Gold
Gloucester High School	Gloucester County, VA	1955	1,780	Dukes	Red & Gold
Grafton High School	Grafton, York County, VA	1996	1,197	Clippers	Blue & Red
Jamestown High School	James City County, VA	1997	1,350	Eagles	Green & Black
Lafayette High School	James City County, VA	1973	1,162	Rams	Navy Blue & Gold
New Kent County High School	New Kent, New Kent County, VA	1950	985	Trojans	Royal Blue & White
Poquoson High School	Poquoson, VA	1910	698	Bull Islanders	Maroon & Gold
Smithfield High School	Smithfield, Isle of Wight County, VA	1906	1,311	Packers	Blue & Gold
Tabb High School	Tabb, York County, VA	1972	1,185	Tigers	Orange & Black
Warhill High School	Lightfoot, James City County, VA	2007	1,305	Lions	Columbia Blue & Black
York High School	Yorktown, York County, VA	1954	1,078	Falcons	Blue & Silver

=== Former members ===
- Franklin High School of Franklin, Virginia (moved to Group A)
- Lakeland High School of Suffolk, Virginia (moved to Group AAA)
- Nansemond River High School of Suffolk, Virginia (moved to Group AAA)
- Southampton High School of Courtland, Virginia (moved to Southside District)

== Champions ==
Season	Football
1999	Lafayette (11–2)
2000	Lafayette (10–2)
2001	Lafayette (11–2)
2002	York (9-2)
2003	York (10–2)
2004	Lafayette (11–1)
2005	Poquoson (9–2)
2006	Lafayette (9–2)
2007	Lafayette (11–1)
2008	Poquoson & Tabb (8–3)
2009	Bruton (11–3)
2010	Poquoson (13–1)
2011	York (11–1)
2012	Smithfield (10–2)
2013	Lafayette (12–1)
2014	Lafayette (14–1)
2015	Lafayette (12–1)
2016	Lafayette (13–1)

== See also ==
- Peninsula District – The other VHSL district on the Virginia Peninsula, mainly for the larger high schools in Hampton and Newport News.
