= Jamestown High School (Virginia) =

Coordinates: 37°15′9.4″N 76°47′20.5″W

Location
- 3751 John Tyler Highway; Williamsburg, Virginia 23185; United States

Information
- Type: Public
- Founded: 1997
- Locale: Suburban, Small
- School district: Williamsburg-James City County Public Schools
- NCES District ID: 5104020
- NCES School ID: 510402001665
- Principal: Karen Scott (Interim)
- Teaching staff: 72.32 (on an FTE basis)
- Grades: 9–12
- Enrollment: 1,243 (2024–25)
- Student to teacher ratio: 17.19
- Language: English
- Colors: Green, black, and white
- Athletics conference: Class 2 Region A, Bay Rivers District
- Team name: Eagles
- Website: wjccschools.org/jhs/

Jamestown High School is a public secondary school at 3751 John Tyler Highway in James City County, Virginia, just outside Williamsburg, Virginia. The school opened in 1997, becoming the second of three high schools in the county. It is part of Williamsburg-James City County Public Schools.

== History ==
Jamestown High School opened in 1997, with the first student body consisting of Lafayette High School students and various local middle school graduates. Its name derives from the nearby Jamestown Settlement. In 2007 Jamestown High School was replaced as the newest school within the district by Warhill High School, which was built to relieve overcrowding. Some students from Jamestown, Lafayette High School and local middle schools made up the first student body there.

== Academics ==
Jamestown High School is fully accredited by the Virginia State Board of Education and the Southern Association of Colleges and Schools. It offers 23 Advanced Placement classes: Biology, Calculus AB, Calculus BC, Chemistry, Computer Science A, Economics, English Language, English Literature, Environmental Science, European History, French, German, Human Geography, Latin, Music Theory, Physics I, Physics II, Psychology, Spanish, Statistics, Studio Art, US Government & Politics, and US History. Students may also take additional AP classes online via Virtual Virginia.

Jamestown offers enrollment at The New Horizons Governor's School for Science and Technology. The Governor's School is a two-year, half-day program for 11th and 12th graders. Admission to the program is highly competitive. Students select either the engineering strand, the biological science strand, or the scientific programming strand.

Jamestown also participates in the AVID program to facilitate preparation for college.

== Culture ==
=== Controversies ===
In 2016, a bus driver and bus aid, husband and wife, were accused of physically and verbally abusing a special needs student. The couple was charged with assault and battery, with the driver also being charged with felony abduction.

An incident occurred in 2019 when, after receiving a tip about a student posting on Snapchat that she intended to sell medications, police found a student in possession of more than 500 pills that were not prescribed to her.

=== Fundraising ===
In 2022, sophomores in an AP Human Geography class went on a 104-mile journey to raise money for an organization that gives food to people in need. The class usually requires students to complete a project to raise money locally or on a larger scale. This would be the first time students had done something this big. They would bike from Williamsburg to Richmond and back again on an eleven-hour journey to raise money. They projected to only raise enough money for four goats. However, they raised a total of $1,450 and were able to buy twenty-one goats.

== Campus ==
The first floor contains classrooms for fine arts, technology (split into engineering, graphics and Cooperative Business Education), math and science. The special education classrooms are also on this level. The second floor has the library (or media center) and classrooms for math, social studies, English and foreign languages (along with English as a Second Language (ESL)).

West of the main building, five trailers that acted as 10 classrooms and could hold around a total of 250 students were brought in to relieve overcrowding. In spite of the reduction in enrollment due to the construction of Warhill High School, two of the trailers have become a permanent part of the campus. The school is surrounded by wooded and swamp areas.

== Enrollment ==
School Year	Number of Students
1997–1998	820
1998–1999	1,101
1999–2000	1,169
2000–2001	1,162
2001–2002	1,256
2002–2003	1,256
2003–2004	1,331
2004–2005	1,451
2005–2006	1,524
2006–2007	1,590*
2007–2008	1,342
2008–2009	1,261
2009–2010	1,232
2010–2011	1,217
2011–2012	1,186
2012–2013	1,211
2013–2014	
2014–2015	
2015–2016	
2016–2017	1,313
2017–2018	1,350
2018–2019	
2019–2020	
2021–2022	1,236
2022–2023	1,229
2023-2024	1,233

[*] A new high school opened this year. Students were redistricted.

[*] There was also an unfortunate series of car accidents.

=== Teacher statistics ===
- Full-time-73 (2024)
- Student/Teacher Ratio= 4:1

=== Demographics ===
As of the 2024 school year, the demographics of Jamestown High School's student body is 62.9% White; 17.7% Hispanic; 10% Black; 6.4% Two or more races; 2.7% Asian; and 0.3% Native American.

== Athletics ==
The school's mascot is an eagle and its sports teams currently play in Class 4 Region A of the Bay Rivers District of the Virginia High School League. Jamestown has won 23 state titles, which include six AA girls' tennis Dynasty state titles from 2000–2002, 2004–2006; five boys' swimming state titles in 2001 and 2006–2008 and 2016; seven AA girls' swimming titles from 2000 to 2002 as well as 2013 to 2017; six AA boys' soccer titles in 2001, 2008, 2012, 2015, 2023, and 2025; one AA girls' soccer title in 1999; six AA golf titles in 1999, 2013, and 2014,2015, 2016, and 2018; one girls' field hockey title in 2001; one AA boys' cross country title in 2001; one boys' tennis title in 2010; and one AA girls' basketball title in 2006, as well as one in 2021. Jamestown also had their first female football player during the 2000–2001 season.

== Theatre ==
The Jamestown High School Theatre Department formed in September 1997. Traditionally it produces three shows every year. There is a fall one-act, a fall play and a spring musical. Jamestown has competed in the Virginia High School League (VHSL) One-Act competitions at the district, regional, and state level. Its production of Degas C'est Moi won all three VHSL Championships.

== Music ==
Jamestown has several musical groups, including a symphonic band and wind ensemble, a marching band and mixed, jazz and chamber choirs, and a string orchestra.

=== Band ===
The Jamestown band has two main ensembles: the symphonic band and the wind ensemble. The former is made up of students enrolled in Woodwind/Brass/Percussion classes (courses in which 9th-10th grade students are usually enrolled), while the latter is made up of advanced-level students (usually 11th-12th grade students). Steve Turner served as Jamestown's Director of Bands from the school's founding in 1997 until his retirement in 2025. Each year the band (usually) goes on a spring trip, where it performs at a festival or concert. Past trips have been to Toronto, Atlanta, and Myrtle Beach.

==== Marching band ====
The marching band is by far the largest musical group at Jamestown. The instrumentation consists of woodwinds, brass, a drum line and a pit (usually keyboard instruments and auxiliary instruments). There is also a color guard that twirls colorful flags, dance, and use other visuals as the school board does not allow the use of rifles or sabers in performances. The band uses a technique very similar to modern style drum and bugle corps.

== Newspaper ==
As of 2026 Jamestown runs a student led online newspaper named "The Talon Times" aptly named after the school mascot, an eagle. This comes after the original paper print newspaper "The Eagle Eye" which has since discontinued years prior. The online Newspaper "The Talon Times," often abbreviated to "TTT" on their official instagram page, is headed by and founded by three students, Harrison Davies (head editor and photographer), Evelyn Johns (head editor and writer), and Mathias Munoz Gonzales (head editor), as well as the groups sponsors Karen Scott (interim principle) and Collin Anderson (special education teacher, track coach, and former author now editor of the college of William and Mary’s sports page through their own online news outlet "flat hat news"). The newspaper primarily reports on monthly news such as school events, sports, clubs, history, current events, holidays, and as of May 2026 cooking/baking.
