= Poquoson High School =

Location
- 51 Odd Road; Poquoson, Virginia 23662; United States; 37°7′43.4″N 76°22′46.9″W

Information
- School type: Public high school
- Founded: 1910
- School district: Poquoson City Schools
- Superintendent: Arty Tillett
- Principal: Dr. Irene Winchester
- Grades: 9–12
- Enrollment: 708 (2019-20)
- Language: English
- Colors: Maroon and Gold
- Athletics conference: Virginia High School League; Bay Rivers District; Region I
- Mascot: Bull Islanders
- Rivals: Tabb High School; Grafton High School
- Communities served: Serves Poquoson
- Website: Official PHS Site

Poquoson High School is a public secondary school, located in Poquoson, Virginia and serves as the sole public secondary school for students in the city. The school was opened in 1910 and currently has approximately 700 students. The school competes in athletics and activities in the Virginia High School League's AA Bay Rivers District. Poquoson High has historically been known for its wrestling program, which has won numerous state championships and has occasionally been ranked nationally.

== History ==
Poquoson High School was established in 1910 to serve the educational needs of the Poquoson District in York County, Virginia. The original building was a two-story wooden structure featuring a cupola, constructed at a cost of $6,000. It was located on the site where the current Poquoson Middle School stands today.

In 1932, the high school moved to a new brick building at 965 Poquoson Avenue, adjacent to the original site. This facility served as the high school until 1976 and now houses Poquoson Middle School.

The growth of nearby Langley Air Force Base and NASA Langley Research Center contributed to an increase in the local population and, consequently, the school's enrollment. In response to the community's desire for greater control over local education, the area was incorporated as the Town of Poquoson in 1952. This move allowed for the establishment of an independent school system.

In 1975, Poquoson transitioned from town to independent city status, further solidifying its autonomy over educational affairs. The following year, in 1977, Poquoson High School moved into its current facility, which has since undergone renovations and expansions to accommodate the growing student body.

== Feeder patterns ==
The following elementary schools feed into PHS:

- Poquoson Primary School (Grades K-2)
- Poquoson Elementary School (Grades 3–5)
- Poquoson Middle School (Grades 6–8)

All residents are zoned to these schools as there are no other public schools in the city.

== Accreditation and rankings ==
- Poquoson High School is fully accredited by the Virginia Department of Education (VDOE) for the 2024–25 academic year.
- The school has been accredited by the Southern Association of Colleges and Schools (SACS) since 1972.
- In the 2025 U.S. News & World Report rankings, Poquoson High School was ranked #3,174 nationally and #68 in Virginia.

According to Niche's 2025 rankings, Poquoson High School was ranked:

- 51st among Best High Schools for Athletes in Virginia
- 99th for Best Public High School Teachers in Virginia
- 112th among Best Public High Schools in Virginia
- 192nd for Best High Schools for STEM in Virginia
- In 2006, Poquoson was recognized among the top 100 communities for music education by the American Music Conference.

== Enrollment history ==
School Year	Number of Students
2010–2011	834
2011–2012	816
2012–2013	802
2013–2014	780
2014–2015	767
2015–2016	760
2016–2017	698
2017–2018	698
2018–2019	714
2019–2020	708
2020–2021	723
2021–2022	693
2022–2023	689
2023–2024	695

== Athletics and interscholastic competition ==
Poquoson High School competes in the Virginia High School's Class II, Region A, and Bay Rivers District. The school competes in the following sports:

=== Baseball ===
Poquoson High School's baseball program has a storied history within the Virginia High School League (VHSL), particularly in Class 2 competition. The Islanders have secured multiple state championships, including titles in 2001, 2009, 2010, and most recently in 2024. The 2024 championship was notably clinched in a dramatic walk-off fashion during the 10th inning against Lebanon High School at Kiwanis Park in Salem, Virginia.

The program has been instrumental in developing talent that progresses to higher levels of baseball. Notably, alumni Kyle Crockett and Chad Pinder advanced to Major League Baseball (MLB), playing for the Cleveland Indians and Oakland Athletics, respectively.

In recognition of the challenges faced during the COVID-19 pandemic, Poquoson High School honored its 2020 senior baseball players with a Hall of Fame-style plaque installed in the home team dugout, acknowledging their contributions despite the season's cancellation.

The Islanders continue to be a competitive force in the Bay Rivers District, consistently participating in regional and state tournaments. Their sustained success underscores the program's commitment to excellence and development of student-athletes.

==== Achievements ====
- Bay Rivers District Regular Season Championships: 1998, 1999, 2000, 2001, 2002, 2009, 2010
- Bay Rivers District Tournament Championships: 1999, 2001, 2006, 2007, 2008, 2010
- Conference Championships: 2014, 2016
- Regional Runner-up: 1992, 1997, 1999, 2001, 2008, 2014
- Regional Championships: 2002, 2009, 2010, 2016, 2021, 2022, 2023, 2024, 2025, 2026
- VHSL State Tournament Appearances: 1922, 1997, 1999, 2001, 2002, 2008, 2009, 2010, 2014, 2016, 2021, 2022, 2023, 2024. 2025, 2026
- VHSL State Runner-up: 2014, 2021, 2023
- VHSL State Championships: 2001 (AA), 2009 (AA), 2010 (AA), 2024 (Class 2)

Poquoson baseball has seen over 50 student-athletes play baseball at the collegiate level (DI, DII, DIII, NAIA, NJCAA, and USCAA), with five of those advancing to professional baseball, including Kyle Crockett and Chad Pinder, who both played in Major League Baseball (MLB).

=== Football ===
In 2010, Poquoson High School's football team captured the Virginia High School League (VHSL) Group AA Division 3 state championship. The Islanders defeated Richlands High School by a score of 23–17 in the title game held on December 11, 2010, at Liberty University's Williams Stadium in Lynchburg, Virginia.

=== Marching band ===
Poquoson High School's marching band program is a 10-time honor band, as accredited by the Virginia Band and Orchestra Directors Association.

=== Odyssey of the Mind ===
Poquoson High, like its feeder schools, has had a positive history with its Odyssey of the Mind. Teams from the school have won numerous district and state titles. This decade, Poquoson teams have also won in the World Tournament (2000 and 2001) and placed in 2002 (3rd place - It's a Snap Division III), 2004 (13th place - Balancing Act Division III), 2005 (6th place - Problem 4 Crazy Columns Division III), and placed in 2023 (3rd place - Where the Structure Division III).

=== Sailing ===
Poquoson High School fields a varsity sailing team that competes in the Virginia Interscholastic Sailing Association (VISA), which is part of the Mid-Atlantic Scholastic Sailing Association (MASSA) under the national Interscholastic Sailing Association (ISSA). The team trains at Messick Point Marina in Poquoson and sails Flying Junior (FJ) class boats.

Poquoson is one of only three public schools in the Hampton Roads area to sponsor a varsity sailing program and one of just 54 schools in the Mid-Atlantic states involved in high school sailing.

The team is supported locally by the Poquoson Sailing Foundation, a nonprofit organization dedicated to promoting youth sailing through fundraising, coaching, and community engagement.

=== Wrestling ===
Poquoson High School boasts one of Virginia's most storied high school wrestling programs. The Islanders have secured 14 Virginia High School League (VHSL) state championships across multiple decades: 1973, 1975, 1977–1981, 1985, 1999, 2018, 2019, 2020, 2021, and 2026.

A highlight in the program's history came in 1999 when Poquoson ended Grundy High School's 12-year state championship streak, clinching the VHSL Group AA title in a closely contested meet against Christiansburg High School.

=== Other ===
- Scholastic Bowl - Poquoson High won the AA state championship in 2001.
- Debate
- Forensics
- One-Act Theatre

== Facilities ==
Poquoson High School now occupies its third building in its history. Poquoson High's second building, which housed the school from the 1930s to 1976, now houses Poquoson Middle School. The school moved into its current facility in 1977, and the building has undergone two additions and renovations, one in 1977 and one in 1998. The football stadium, where football and soccer games are played, is located off campus at Poquoson Middle School. Facilities for the wrestling team are located adjacent to the football stadium.

== Partner schools ==
Poquoson has two current partner schools.

- Balboa Academy, Panama
- Uruguayan American School, Uruguay

== Alumni ==
- Kyle Crockett, Major League Baseball player.
- Susie Evans, former Miss Virginia Teen USA and Miss Virginia USA and contestant on the 26th season of The Bachelor
- Chad Pinder, Major League Baseball player.
- Baiju Bhatt, founder and co-founder of companies in different fields of activity.
