= Bruton High School =

Coordinates: 37°18′38″N 76°41′30″W

Location
- 185 East Rochambeau Drive; Williamsburg, Virginia 23188; United States

Information
- School type: Public high school
- Founded: 1976
- School district: York County School Division
- Superintendent: Dr. James Carroll
- Principal: Vadella Ellis-Pope
- Grades: 9–12
- Enrollment: 711 (2022-23)
- Language: English
- Colors: Green and Gold
- Athletics conference: Virginia High School League; Bay Rivers District; Region I
- Mascot: Panther
- Rivals: Lafayette High School; Jamestown High School; Warhill High School
- Website: Official Site

Bruton High School is a high school located north of Williamsburg in the unincorporated community of Lightfoot in York County, Virginia.

The school opened in 1976. It is part of the York County School Division, serving upper county citizens in Williamsburg. Athletic teams compete in the Virginia High School League's AA Bay Rivers District in Region I. Bruton houses the York County School of the Arts, the county's fine arts magnet program.

== Accreditation ==
Bruton High is fully accredited by the Virginia Department of Education and has been accredited by the Southern Association of Colleges and Schools since 1976.

== Feeder patterns ==
The following elementary schools feed into Bruton H.S.:

- Magruder Elementary School
- Waller Mill Elementary School

All students zoned to Queens Lake Middle School are zoned to Bruton High School.

== Athletics ==
Bruton High fields teams in these sports:

- Cheerleading (Head Coach: Charity Choice)
- Cross-Country (Head Coach: Sherrod Curry)
- Field Hockey (Head Coach: Cate Westenberger)
- Football (State Runner up 2009)(Head Coach: Barrington Morrison)
- Golf (Head Coach: )
- Volleyball (Head Coach: Charlene Daugherty)(2023 State Runner Up)
- Boys Basketball (Head Coach: Albert Haskins)(2000 AA State Championship)
- Girls Basketball (Head Coach: Quanisha Harris)
- Boys and Girls Indoor Track and Field (Head Coach: Sherrod Curry)(2022 & 2024 Boys AA State Champions)(2024 Girls AA State Champions)
- Boys and Girls Swimming (Head Coach: Richard Long)(2022, 2023, 2024 AA Girls State Champions)
- Wrestling (Head Coach: Rhiannon Overby)
- Baseball (Head Coach: Obie Boykin)
- Boys and Girls Outdoor Track and Field (Head Coach: Sherrod Curry)(2024 Boys AA State Champions)(1997 & 1998 Girls AA State Champions)
- Boys Soccer (Head Coach: Luke Taylor)
- Boys Tennis (Head Coach: James Barr)(2024 AA State Champions)
- Girls Soccer (Head Coach: James Flynn)
- Girls Tennis (Head Coach: John Jacobson)
- Girls Softball (Head Coach: Kyle Cowles)

== Notable alumni ==
- Monstah Black, musician and artist
- Zena Cardman, 2017 NASA astronaut
- Onrea Jones, former professional football player, Arizona Cardinals
- Mark Montgomery, former professional baseball player, Scranton/Wilkes-Barre RailRiders
- Bryan Randall, former professional football player, American Arena League
- Lorenzo Taliaferro, professional football player
- Elizabeth Winder, author
- Paul Winfree, chair of the Fulbright Foreign Scholarship Board and former Deputy Assistant to the President for Domestic Policy, Deputy Director of the White House Domestic Policy Council, and Director of Budget Policy
