= Mark Montgomery (baseball) =

Free agent
- Relief pitcher
- Born: August 30, 1990 (age 36); Williamsburg, Virginia, U.S.
- Bats: Right Throws: Right
- Stats at Baseball Reference

Mark Montgomery (born August 30, 1990) is an American minor league baseball pitcher who is a free agent.

A native of Williamsburg, Virginia, Montgomery attended Bruton High School, and was drafted by the Yankees out of Longwood University in the 11th round of the 2011 MLB draft. He won the Yankees' Kevin Lawn Award for 2012.

== Career ==
=== New York Yankees ===
Montgomery began his career with the Low–A Staten Island Yankees of the New York–Penn League in 2011, where he pitched four games before being promoted to the Single–A Charleston RiverDogs for the rest of the year. The day after his promotion, Montgomery record five strikeouts in one inning. Between the two teams, he had a 1.91 ERA, 51 strikeouts, 13 walks, and 15 saves in 26 games with 28.1 innings pitched, with no win-loss record.

In 2012, Montgomery started the season with the Yankees' High–A affiliate, the Tampa Yankees, before earning a promotion to the Trenton Thunder, the organization's Double-A affiliate. He was selected as a Florida State League Mid-Season All-Star. Between the two levels, Montgomery went 7-2 with a stellar 1.54 ERA in 46 games/64.1 innings pitched with 99 strikeouts, 22 walks, and 15 saves once again. He also pitched in the Arizona Fall League that year, appearing in the Rising Stars game and being named to the AFL All-Prospect Team.

Before the 2013 season, Baseball Prospectus ranked Montgomery the Yankees' 9th best prospect. MLB.com places him as the team's 8th best prospect. He started the year with the Triple-A Scranton/Wilkes-Barre RailRiders, but dealt with a loss in velocity that the organization blamed on a poor conditioning regimen in the offseason. He dealt with shoulder fatigue and had three different stints on the disabled list that year. For the season, his ERA regressed to 3.38 in 45.1 innings over 29 games (including four games with the GCL Yankees). He still struck out 59 batters, but walked 25 while dealing with command issues.

Despite being healthy again in 2014, Montgomery's velocity didn't return and he relied heavily on his slider. He was ultimately demoted to Double-A when the Yankees signed Heath Bell to a minor league deal in June. For the season between the two teams, he held a 2-1 record, 2.10 ERA (including a microscopic 0.81 for Trenton), 51 strikeouts, 26 walks, and 4 saves in 51.1 innings pitched.

Montgomery was not invited to big league camp in 2015 and began the season in Double-A Trenton. He allowed two runs and struck out 13 in 12 innings, seeing his velocity return to the low 90s. He earned a promotion back to Scranton in May but spent the season bouncing between the two levels. Overall, he accumulated a 2.66 ERA, 17 saves, 53 strikeouts, and 17 walks in 50.2 innings. He pitched in the Venezuelan Winter League in the offseason.

Montgomery was added to big league camp in 2016. He once again spent the season split between Trenton and Scranton, pitching to a 2.56 ERA, striking out 63 and walking 22 in 45.2 innings. He also pitched for Scranton in the International League championship series. The Yankees released him on March 31, 2017.

=== St. Louis Cardinals ===
Montgomery then signed a minor league contract with the St. Louis Cardinals organization. In 46 games for the Triple–A Memphis Redbirds, he registered a 5–1 record and 2.43 ERA with 73 strikeouts and 5 saves in 66 2/3 innings pitched. He elected free agency following the season on November 6.

=== Detroit Tigers ===
He signed a minor league contract with the Detroit Tigers on November 25, 2017. The deal included an invitation to the Tigers' 2018 spring training camp. Montgomery was assigned to the Triple-A Toledo Mud Hens, where he made 12 appearances with a 1.98 ERA in 13 2/3 innings pitched. He was released on July 8, 2018, reportedly after suffering a potentially season-ending elbow injury.

=== Boston Red Sox ===
On July 20, 2018, Montgomery signed with the Boston Red Sox, in a minor league deal to run through the 2019 season. In August, Montgomery pitched for the Gulf Coast League Red Sox and the High–A Salem Red Sox on rehabilitation assignments, making two relief appearances with each team and allowing a total of four earned runs in 3 2/3 innings pitched.

Montgomery started the 2019 season on the injured list with the Triple-A Pawtucket Red Sox. He was released from the Red Sox organization on May 16, 2019.
