= Chad Pinder =

American baseball player (born 1992)

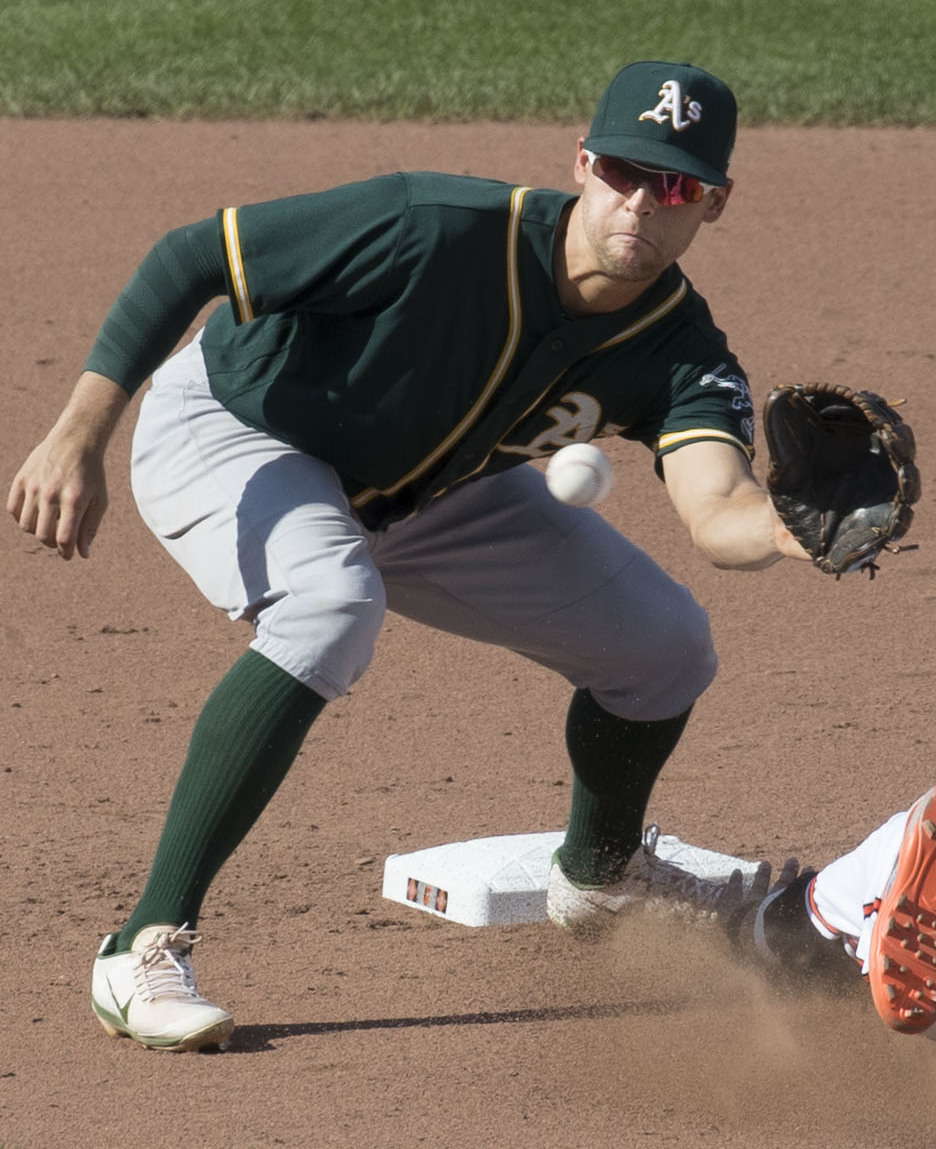
- Pinder with the Oakland Athletics
- Utility player
- Born: March 29, 1992 (age 34); Richmond, Virginia, U.S.
- Batted: Right Threw: Right

MLB debut
- August 20, 2016, for the Oakland Athletics

Last MLB appearance
- October 5, 2022, for the Oakland Athletics

MLB statistics
- Batting average: .242
- Home runs: 62
- Runs batted in: 197
- Stats at Baseball Reference

Teams
- Oakland Athletics (2016–2022)

Chadwick Hudson Pinder (born March 29, 1992) is an American former professional baseball utility player. He played in Major League Baseball (MLB) for the Oakland Athletics from 2016 to 2022.

== Amateur career ==
Pinder attended Poquoson High School in Virginia. He and teammate Kyle Crockett led their high school baseball team to state championships in 2009 and 2010.

Pinder played college baseball at Virginia Tech for the Hokies from 2011 to 2013. He played in 150 games, hitting .322/.389/.509 with 18 home runs. In 2012, he played collegiate summer baseball with the Chatham Anglers of the Cape Cod Baseball League.

== Professional career ==
=== Oakland Athletics ===
The Oakland Athletics selected Pinder in the second round of the 2013 Major League Baseball draft. He made his professional debut for the Vermont Lake Monsters that year and spent the whole season there, batting .200 with three home runs and eight RBIs in 42 games. In 2014, he played in 94 games with the Stockton Ports, hitting .288 with 13 home runs and 55 RBIs. In 2015, he played for the Midland RockHounds where he slashed .317/.361/.486 with 15 home runs and 86 RBIs in 117 games. Pinder won the Texas League Player of the Year Award that season. After the season, he played in the Arizona Fall League. He began the 2016, season with the Nashville Sounds.

Pinder was promoted to the Athletics on August 17, 2016. Prior to his promotion, he was batting .258 with 14 home runs and 51 RBIs in 107 games for the Sounds. He made his major league debut on August 20. Pinder spent the remainder of 2016 with Oakland after his promotion, batting .235 with one home run in 22 games. In 2017, he began the season with Nashville, but was recalled on April 16 for the rest of the season. In 87 games for the Athletics, he slashed .238/.292/.457 with 15 home runs and 42 RBIs. In 2019, Pinder hit .240 with 13 home runs and 47 RBI in 124 games. In 2020 for the Athletics, Pinder slashed .232/.295/.393 with 2 home runs in only 61 plate appearances. In 2021, he slashed .243/.300/.411 with 6 home runs and 27 RBIs in 75 games.

On July 12, 2022, Pinder hit a grand slam off of Texas Rangers reliever Kolby Allard as part of an 8-run 12th inning in the 14-7 victory. Two weeks later, on July 26, Pinder hit another grand slam, this time off of Houston Astros starter Luís García, that helped propel the A's to a 5-3 victory. In 2022, he slashed .235/.263/.385 with 12 home runs and 42 RBIs in 111 games. He became a free agent following the season.

=== Cincinnati Reds ===
On January 30, 2023, Pinder signed a minor league contract with the Cincinnati Reds organization that included an invitation to spring training. Pinder hit .103/.167/.154 in 42 plate appearances in spring training before he was released on March 24.

=== Washington Nationals ===
On March 27, 2023, Pinder signed a minor league deal with the Washington Nationals organization. He played in 16 games for the Triple-A Rochester Red Wings, batting .218/.307/.309 with one home run and four RBI. On May 5, Pinder was released by the Nationals.

=== Atlanta Braves ===
On May 9, 2023, Pinder signed a minor league contract with the Atlanta Braves organization. In 7 games for Gwinnett, he hit .323/.344/.548 with 2 home runs and 3 RBI. On May 27, Pinder announced he would retire from professional baseball following that night's game against the Durham Bulls.

== Coaching career ==
On January 18, 2025, the Chicago White Sox hired Pinder to serve as the manager for their Low-A affiliate, the Kannapolis Cannon Ballers. On January 22, 2026, the Chicago White Sox promoted Pinder to serve as the manager of their Triple-A affiliate, the Charlotte Knights.

== Personal life ==
Pinder's brother, Chase, played college baseball for the Clemson Tigers and was selected in the seventh round of the 2017 Major League Baseball draft by the St. Louis Cardinals and currently plays in the San Francisco Giants organization.
