= Matthew Whaley School =

Elementary school in Virginia, US

- U.S. National Register of Historic Places
- Virginia Landmarks Register
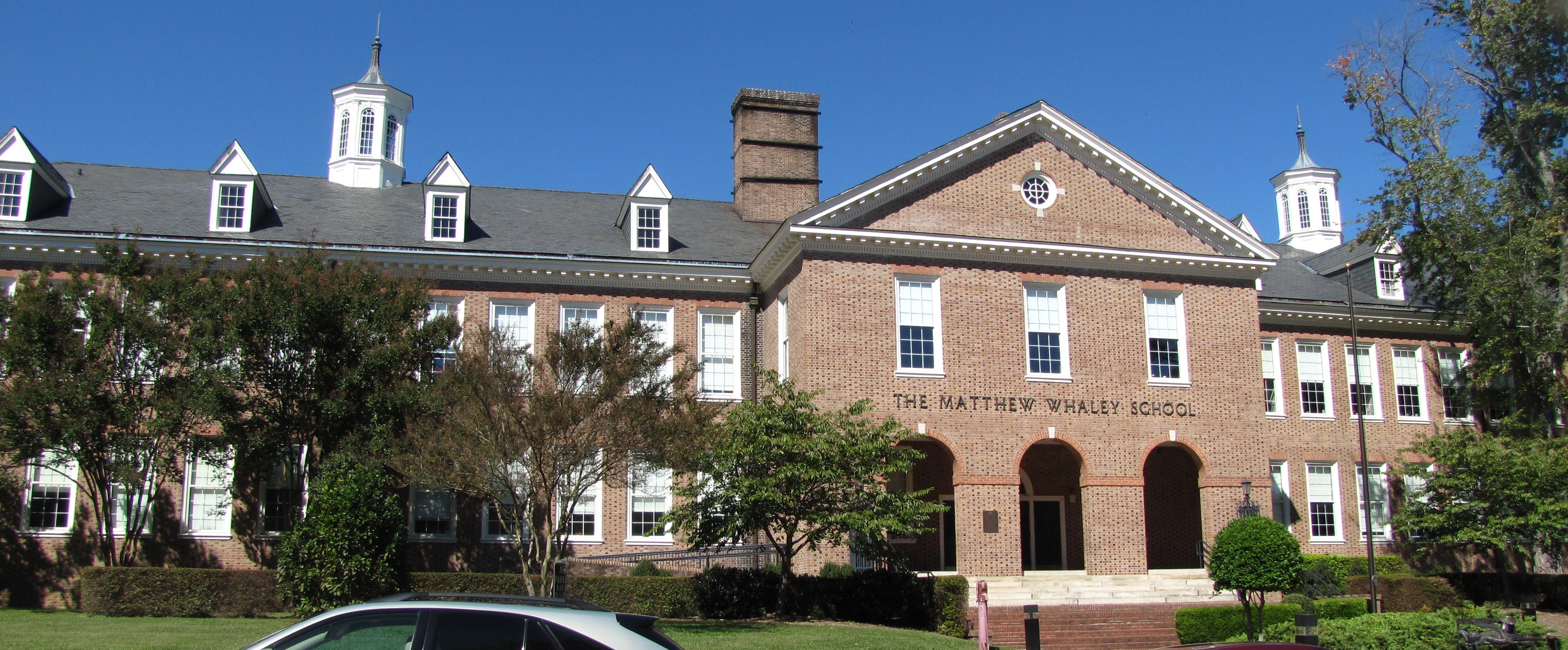

- Location within Virginia Location within the United States
- Location: 301 Scotland St., Williamsburg, Virginia
- Coordinates: 37°16′26″N 76°42′15″W
- Area: 8.3 acres (3.4 ha)
- Built: 1931
- Architect: Charles M. Robinson
- Architectural style: Georgian Revival
- NRHP reference No.: 04000857
- VLR No.: 137-0302

Significant dates
- Added to NRHP: August 13, 2004
- Designated VLR: June 16, 2004

Matthew Whaley School is a public elementary school located in the Peacock Hill neighborhood of Williamsburg, Virginia, occupying a historic school building. It is within the Williamsburg-James City County Public Schools.

The Georgian Revival structure was built between 1929 and 1930 based on a design by noted Virginia architect Charles M. Robinson. The monumental school building was located adjacent to the Governor's Palace in Colonial Williamsburg and "quickly became a local landmark of considerable architectural pretension." The building's exterior features Flemish bond brickwork with glazed headers trimmed with a modillion cornice, and a hipped slate roof pierced by gables and topped with a pair of glazed cupolas. The structure has been well preserved with little alteration. The school was operated as a training school for the College of William and Mary and as a general public school serving students from kindergarten through twelfth grade. In 1955, James Blair High School opened, and the Matthew Whaley School became a grammar school serving children from kindergarten through fifth grade. From 1997 to 1998, the school underwent a $5.4 million renovation which included improvements to make the building accessible to the handicapped and refurbishing the original slate roof.

In June 2004, the Virginia Board of Historic Resources added the school to the Virginia Landmarks Register. The building was also listed on the National Register of Historic Places in August 2004.

Matthew Whaley is part of the Williamsburg-James City County Public Schools system.
