= Terry Kirby =

American football player (born 1970)

No. 43, 41, 42
- Position: Running back

Personal information
- Born: January 20, 1970 (age 56); Hampton, Virginia, U.S.
- Listed height: 6 ft 1 in (1.85 m)
- Listed weight: 225 lb (102 kg)

Career information
- High school: Tabb (Tabb, Virginia)
- College: Virginia
- NFL draft: 1993: 3rd round, 78th overall pick

Career history
- Miami Dolphins (1993–1995); San Francisco 49ers (1996–1998); Cleveland Browns (1999); Oakland Raiders (2000–2002); Tampa Bay Buccaneers (2003)*
- * Offseason or practice squad member only

Awards and highlights
- 2× First-team All-ACC (1990, 1991); Second-team All-ACC (1992); Virginia Cavaliers Jersey No. 42 retired

Career NFL statistics
- Carries: 761
- Rushing yards: 2,875
- Receiving yards: 3,222
- Return yards: 2,374
- Total touchdowns: 43
- Stats at Pro Football Reference

Terry Gayle Kirby (born January 20, 1970) is an American former professional football player who was a running back for 10 seasons in the National Football League (NFL) from 1993 to 2002. Standing 6'1", he played college football for the Virginia Cavaliers. He is the younger brother of former Major League Baseball player Wayne Kirby. Co Owner of Ultimate Sports Institute in Weston, Florida and now is a coach for the Weston Warriors. He also won the Superhole III cornhole champion in 2022

== High school ==
Kirby played high school football at Tabb High School in York County, Virginia, leading his team to a state championship in 1987. He was selected to Parade's All-America team and the USA Today All-USA team after his senior year in 1988. As of 2014, he holds the Virginia High School League records for most 100-yard rushing games, career (36), most consecutive 100-yard games (26), and career rushing attempts (995). He ranks fourth in career points scored, third in career touchdowns, and second in career rushing yards with 7,428. In 2007, he was inducted into the Virginia High School League Hall of Fame.

Also a standout high school basketball player, his 2,246 career points rank 17th on the all-time VHSL scoring list. Participating in the 1988 Arby's Classic, he holds the tournament records for most field-goal attempts, game (33), and most field-goal attempts, tournament (105).

== College career ==
Kirby played running back for the University of Virginia from 1989 to 1992, finishing his career as the school's all-time leader in rushing yards (3,348), a mark that has since been eclipsed by Tiki Barber and Thomas Jones. He led the Atlantic Coast Conference (ACC) in rushing in 1990 and 1992. He led his team in receptions his junior and senior seasons and ranks fifth in career all-purpose yards at UVA.

== Professional career ==
Pre-draft measurables
Height	Weight	Arm length	Hand span	40-yard dash	10-yard split	20-yard split	20-yard shuttle	Vertical jump	Broad jump	Bench press
6 ft 1 1/4 in (1.86 m)	221 lb (100 kg)	33 in (0.84 m)	9 1/2 in (0.24 m)	4.64 s	1.67 s	2.72 s	4.14 s	38.0 in (0.97 m)	10 ft 0 in (3.05 m)	18 reps

Kirby was drafted in the third round by the Miami Dolphins in 1993. His best year as a pro came during the 1996 season as a member of the San Francisco 49ers, when he started 10 games and rushed for 559 yards on 134 carries. He finished his NFL career with 2,875 rushing yards, 3,222 receiving yards and 43 total touchdowns (including three kickoff returns and one punt return for touchdown). He also completed 4 passes on 6 attempts in his career, with three touchdowns and no interceptions.

Kirby broke his ankle in 2002 in a Week 7 contest against the San Diego Chargers. He left the game on a cart with his leg in an aircast.

Following his NFL career, Kirby worked as a personal trainer.

== Camp Wekeela ==
Kirby spends his summers working with children at Camp Wekeela. He dedicates his time to teach special programs like tackle football, strength and fitness and speed training.

== NFL career statistics ==
=== Regular season ===
Year	Team	Games		Rushing					Receiving					Punt returns					Kickoff returns				
Year	Team	GP	GS	Att	Yds	Avg	Lng	TD	Rec	Yds	Avg	Lng	TD	Ret	Yds	Avg	Lng	TD	Ret	Yds	Avg	Lng	TD
1993	MIA	16	8	119	390	3.3	20	3	75	874	11.7	47	3	—	—	—	—	—	4	85	21.3	26	0
1994	MIA	4	4	60	233	3.9	30	2	14	154	11.0	26	0	—	—	—	—	—	—	—	—	—	—
1995	MIA	16	4	108	414	3.8	38	4	66	618	9.4	46	3	—	—	—	—	—	—	—	—	—	—
1996	SF	14	10	134	559	4.2	31	3	52	439	8.4	52	1	1	3	3.0	3	0	1	22	22.0	22	0
1997	SF	16	3	125	418	3.3	38	6	23	279	12.1	82	1	—	—	—	—	—	3	124	41.3	101	1
1998	SF	9	0	48	258	5.4	31	3	16	134	8.4	25	0	—	—	—	—	—	17	340	20.0	33	0
1999	CLE	16	10	130	452	3.5	28	6	58	528	9.1	78	3	—	—	—	—	—	11	230	20.9	28	0
2000	OAK	2	0	11	51	4.6	28	0	3	19	6.3	9	0	—	—	—	—	—	—	—	—	—	—
2001	OAK	11	0	10	49	4.9	20	0	9	62	6.9	9	0	—	—	—	—	—	46	1,066	23.2	90	1
2002	OAK	6	0	16	51	3.2	13	0	17	115	6.8	24	1	0	79	—	79	1	19	425	22.4	96	1
Career		110	39	761	2,875	3.8	38	27	333	3,222	9.7	82	12	1	82	82.0	79	1	101	2,292	22.7	101	3

=== Postseason ===
Year	Team	Games		Rushing					Receiving					Punt returns					Kickoff returns				
Year	Team	GP	GS	Att	Yds	Avg	Lng	TD	Rec	Yds	Avg	Lng	TD	Ret	Yds	Avg	Lng	TD	Ret	Yds	Avg	Lng	TD
1995	MIA	1	0	2	8	4.0	7	1	8	68	8.5	19	1	—	—	—	—	—	—	—	—	—	—
1996	SF	2	2	22	57	2.6	12	0	8	59	7.4	16	4	5	33	6.6	15	0	—	—	—	—	—
1997	SF	2	2	31	141	4.5	22	2	7	31	4.4	12	1	—	—	—	—	—	—	—	—	—	—
1998	SF	2	0	14	54	3.9	12	0	4	21	5.3	9	1	—	—	—	—	—	—	—	—	—	—
2000	OAK	2	0	11	37	3.4	17	0	4	76	19.0	32	4	—	—	—	—	—	—	—	—	—	—
2001	OAK	2	0	2	3	1.5	3	0	—	—	—	—	—	—	—	—	—	—	7	157	22.4	26	0
Career		11	4	82	300	3.7	22	3	31	255	8.2	32	11	5	33	6.6	15	0	7	157	22.4	26	0
