= Christian Taylor (American football) =

American football coach

Current position
- Title: Offensive coordinator & quarterbacks coach
- Team: Wyoming
- Conference: Mountain West

Biographical details
- Born: Yorktown, Virginia, U.S.
- Education: College of William & Mary

Playing career
- 2002–2006: William & Mary
- Position: Quarterback

Coaching career (HC unless noted)
- 2008: William & Mary (TE)
- 2009: William & Mary (QB)
- 2010: San Diego State (OA)
- 2011: Michigan (OA)
- 2012–2013: San Diego (RB)
- 2014–2015: Illinois Wesleyan (OC)
- 2016–2017: San Diego (WR)
- 2018: San Diego (co-OC/QB)
- 2019: San Diego (OC/QB)
- 2020–2023: William & Mary (OC/RB)
- 2024: Buffalo Bills (DQC)
- 2025: Buffalo Bills (DA/off. advisor)
- 2026–present: Wyoming (OC/QB)

Accomplishments and honors

Awards
- AFCA FCS Assistant Coach of the Year (2023)

Christian Taylor is an American football coach who is currently the offensive coordinator and quarterbacks coach at the University of Wyoming.

== Playing career ==
Taylor grew up in Yorktown, Virginia and attended Grafton High School. He played college football at William & Mary, where he was a backup quarterback for four seasons and the Tribes' primary holder on field goal attempts for his final two seasons.

== Coaching career ==
Taylor began his coaching career at William & Mary as a tight ends coach in 2008 and served as the Tribe's quarterbacks coach in 2009. He was hired as an offensive assistant at San Diego State by head coach Brady Hoke in 2010. Taylor followed Hoke to Michigan after he was hired as the Wolverines' head coach in 2011.

After one year as an offensive assistant at Michigan, Taylor was hired as the running backs coach and recruiting coordinator at the University of San Diego. Taylor spent two years with the Toreros before leaving to become the offensive coordinator at Illinois Wesleyan University. IWU averaged a College Conference of Illinois and Wisconsin-high 34.3 points per game in 2015.

Taylor returned to USD as the Toreros' wide receivers coach in 2016 and spent two seasons at that position before being promoted to co-offensive coordinator and quarterbacks coach in 2018. He was USD's sole offensive coordinator in 2019.

Taylor hired as the offensive coordinator and running backs coach before the start of the 2020 season. The Tribe led Colonial Athletic Association (CAA) in 2021 with 205 rushing yards per game.

On February 7, 2024, Taylor was named as defensive quality control coach for the Buffalo Bills under head coach Sean McDermott, who is also a William & Mary alumnus.

On December 19, 2025, the University of Wyoming hired Taylor to serve as the program's new offensive coordinator.
