= Ben Edwards (American football) =

American football player and coach (born 1992)

No. 83
- Position: Wide receiver

Personal information
- Born: April 11, 1992 (age 34); Newport News, Virginia, U.S.
- Listed height: 5 ft 10 in (1.78 m)
- Listed weight: 197 lb (89 kg)

Career information
- High school: York (Yorktown, Virginia)
- College: Richmond (2010–2013)
- NFL draft: 2014: undrafted

Career history

Playing
- New York Giants (2015–2016)

Coaching
- York HS (VA) (2015) Wide receivers coach

Awards and highlights
- 2× First-team All-CAA (2012, 2013)

Career NFL statistics
- Receptions: 1
- Receiving yards: 9
- Receiving touchdowns: 0
- Stats at Pro Football Reference

Ben Edwards (born April 11, 1992) is an American former professional football player who was a wide receiver for the New York Giants of the National Football League (NFL). He played football and basketball at York High School in Yorktown, Virginia. He played college football for the Richmond Spiders for four years. Edwards earned first-team All-CAA honors in 2012 after leading the CAA in receptions with 80. He was also named first-team All-CAA his senior year in 2013. After going undrafted in the 2014 NFL draft, Edwards remained unsigned until being signed by the Giants in May 2015. He played in two games for the Giants in 2015, catching one pass for nine yards. He spent the entire 2016 season on injured reserve and became a free agent afterwards.

== Early life ==
Edwards played high school football at York High School in Yorktown, Virginia. He earned Offensive Player of the Year honors in the Bay Rivers District during his junior year in 2008. He also garnered first-team All-District and All-Region accolades as both a quarterback and kick returner. Edwards earned second-team All-District accolades as a punter as well. In late September 2009, he suffered a sprained ankle, which slowed him for several weeks. In late October 2009, he suffered a broken collarbone that caused him to miss two games. Edwards played basketball at York High as well. He averaged 14.0 points and 5.4 assists per game in his junior year, garnering All-District honors.

He had scholarship offers from the University of Richmond, James Madison University and the College of William & Mary.

== College career ==
Edwards played wide receiver for the Richmond Spiders of the University of Richmond from 2010 to 2013.

He played in ten games, starting five of them, throughout his freshman season in 2010, catching nine passes for 129 yards and a touchdown. In 2011, he appeared in eleven games, of which he started ten, recording 44 receptions for 509 yards and six touchdowns. Edwards earned CAA All-Academic accolades the same year.

He started all eleven games in his junior year in 2012 and led the CAA in receptions with 80. He also totaled 852 yards receiving and three receiving touchdowns. Edwards rushed for 117 yards on sixteen attempts that same year as well. He garnered first-team All-CAA, first-team VaSID All-State, College Sports Madness third-team All-CAA, CAA All-Academic and Touchdown Club of Richmond Division I National End/Wide Receiver of the Year honors in 2012.

He played in nine games his senior year in 2013, catching 74 passes for 706 yards and five touchdowns. Edwards also rushed for 138 yards and one touchdown on 31 carries while returning 12 punts for 124 yards. He earned first-team All-CAA, second-team VaSID All-State, College Sports Madness second-team All-CAA, CAA All-Academic and Touchdown Club of Richmond Division I National End/Wide Receiver of the Year accolades in 2013. He also garnered College Sports Madness third-team All-CAA punt returner recognition in 2013. Edwards tore his ACL in a game against the Delaware Fightin' Blue Hens on November 16, 2013, and underwent surgery for the injury ten days later. He majored in leadership at Richmond.

== Professional career ==
Edwards participated in Richmond's Pro Day on March 18, 2014, but did not run the 40-yard dash. He visited the New York Giants in April 2014. He was rated the 155th best wide receiver in the 2014 NFL draft by NFLDraftScout.com. Edwards had a tryout with the Cleveland Browns of the NFL on August 5, 2014. He worked as a recruiter at Fork Union Military Academy in 2014. He was also an assistant coach with Fork Union's postgraduate football team and varsity lacrosse team during the 2014–15 academic year. He participated in the Giants' three-day rookie minicamp in May 2015.

Pre-draft measurables
Height	Weight	20-yard shuttle	Three-cone drill	Bench press
5 ft 10 1/2 in (1.79 m)	200 lb (91 kg)	4.52 s	6.80 s	11 reps
All values from Richmond Pro Day

Edwards signed with the New York Giants on May 11, 2015, after a strong performance in the rookie minicamp. He suffered a hamstring injury at the end of the mandatory minicamp in June. He was waived/injured by the Giants on July 31. Edwards reverted to injured reserve on August 1, 2015. He was waived from the injured reserve list with an injury settlement on August 7, 2015. He then spent time as a wide receivers coach at York High School while recovering from his hamstring injury before being signed to the Giants' practice squad on November 18, 2015. Edwards was promoted to the active roster on December 24 after wide receiver Odell Beckham Jr. was suspended for one game. He made his NFL debut on December 27, 2015, against the Minnesota Vikings, catching one pass for nine yards on two targets while also returning a kickoff for twenty yards. He also played against the Philadelphia Eagles on January 3, 2016.

Edwards suffered a mild left knee sprain during voluntary workouts on April 27, 2016. He later returned to offseason workouts. He tore the ACL in his knee during practice on May 7 and was later ruled out for the season. Edwards was waived/injured by the team on May 9. He reverted to injured reserve the following day.

After spending the entire 2016 season on injured reserve, he was not offered a contract by the Giants, making him a free agent.

=== Statistics ===
Year	Team	GP	GS	Receiving				
Year	Team	GP	GS	Rec	Yds	Avg	Lng	TD
2015	NYG	2	0	1	9	9.0	9	0

== Personal life ==
Edwards's father played football for the Virginia Tech Hokies. Ben's brother, Aaron, played as a quarterback for the Christopher Newport Captains football team.
