= Lafayette High School (Virginia) =

Coordinates: 37°18′56.9″N 76°45′50″W

Location
- 4460 Longhill Road; Williamsburg, Virginia 23188; United States

Information
- School type: Public high school
- Founded: 1973
- School district: Williamsburg-James City County Public Schools
- Superintendent: Daniel Keever
- Principal: Howard Townsend
- Grades: 9–12
- Enrollment: 1,199 (2025-2026)
- Language: English
- Campus: Suburban
- Colors: Navy, gold and white
- Athletics conference: Virginia High School League; Bay Rivers District; Region 4A
- Mascot: Ram
- Rivals: Jamestown High School; Warhill High School
- Website: Official Site

Lafayette High School is a public secondary school in James City County, Virginia, just outside the city limits of Williamsburg, Virginia. It is part of Williamsburg-James City County Public Schools and is located at 4460 Longhill Road.

Most of the Williamsburg city limits is in the Lafayette High attendance zone.

== History ==
Lafayette High School opened in 1973 and served as the sole high school for James City County and Williamsburg City. The school itself is located in James City County though it has a Williamsburg mailing address.

In 1997, half of its student body with the exception of rising seniors were moved to Jamestown High School which opened to alleviate overcrowding at Lafayette. The Williamsburg area began to develop rapidly in the late 1990s and 2000s, which prompted the opening of Warhill High School in 2007. Students were forced to redistrict.

== Campus ==
The main office is located right at the main entrance of the school. The wide hallway opens up into the "upper commons". The cafeteria is located in this area. There are three lines for purchasing food. The auditorium is located to the left. Three large hallways branch out from the "upper commons." A smaller hallway leads to the girls locker room and the weight room used for athletic training. The first hallway across from the main office leads to the marketing classes, the gymnasium, and the boys locker room. There are two hallways which parallel the sides of the auditorium. The first is known as “the ramp.” Another hallway at the top of the ramp leads to the fine arts classrooms. The other hallway leads to the stairs. Another hallway branches off here as well. It leads to the mathematics and art classrooms. At the end of the ramp and the stairs is the "lower commons." The lower commons is a smaller gathering area that is busy when classes are changing. The media center is located at the back of the lower commons. A loop goes around the media center. On one side is the semicircular world language and science hallway. On the outside of the semicircle is a pair of well equipped computer labs. On the other side is the social studies and technology hallway. At the back of the loop surrounding the Media Center is the entrance/exit to the bus loop. Two hallways branch off from the lower commons. One leads to the small lecture hall and the fine arts hallway. The other leads to math hallway and the social studies hallway.

== Enrollment ==
=== Teacher statistics ===
- Full-time: 70 (2022-2023)
- Student/Teacher Ratio: 17.1:1

=== Demographics ===
As of the 2022-2023 school year, Lafayette High School's student body was 50.5% White; 22.2% Black; 16.1% Hispanic; 3.3% Asian; and 7.8% other. The school was 52% male and 48% female.

== Athletics ==
Lafayette athletic logo

The mascot is a ram and the sports teams currently play in the Bay Rivers District. Lafayette High School is a VHSL Class 4 School. Lafayette High School was moved up from Class 3 to Class 4 for the 2025-2026 school year.. Lafayette High School has major track, cross country, and football programs that has produced several professional athletes. Before Jamestown's opening, the Rams were in the AAA Peninsula District. The Rams have won twenty AA state titles. They have five girls swimming titles from 2004–2008; one in field hockey in 2003; three titles in boys swimming in 1999, 2000, and 2009; two in boys indoor track in 2005 and 2015; one in boys outdoor track in 2005; two in football in 2001 and 2021; two consecutive individual girls tennis singles titles from 2007-2008; one in boys cross country in 2013; one in girls outdoor track in 2015; and in baseball in 2015 and 2019.

== Notable alumni ==
- Mark Carnevale, professional golfer, winner of 1992 Chattanooga Classic and 1992 PGA Tour Rookie of the Year.
- Michael Derks, Balsac, the Jaws of Death, guitarist for the heavy metal band Gwar
- Mel Gray, former kick returner for the NFL's New Orleans Saints, Detroit Lions, Houston Oilers and the Philadelphia Eagles.
- Although Bruce Hornsby, three time Grammy Award winning pianist and singer, has been listed as an alumnus of Lafayette High School, he actually was in the last graduating class of James Blair High School, Williamsburg, Virginia, in June 1973.
- Mike Green, college football defensive end
- Seneca Lassiter,1997, 2002 U.S. Outdoor 1,500m champ; 2001 U.S. Indoor mile champ; 1997, 98 NCAA 1500 champ; 1999 & 2001 USA 1,500m runner-up.
- Chris Luzar, former NFL player.
- Terrance Martin, former NFL player.
- Mark Morton, guitar player for the heavy metal band Lamb of God
- Alan Theodore Sherman (’74) is Professor of Computer Science at the University of Maryland, Baltimore County (UMBC). As director of the UMBC Chess Program, Sherman led the UMBC Chess Team to win a record six national collegiate championships and ten Pan-American championships. He earned a PhD in computer science from MIT.
- Canaan Smith, American country singer and a reality television contestant on The Amazing Race
- Ron Springs, former running back for the NFL's Dallas Cowboys and Tampa Bay Buccaneers.
- Lawrence Taylor, retired Hall of Fame American football player who played his entire career as a linebacker for the NFL's New York Giants. Regarded by many as the greatest defensive player of all time. Also holds the Giants career sack record with 142. Taylor also defeated Bam Bam Bigelow at WWF's WrestleMania XI in 1995
