= Kyle Crockett =

American baseball player (born 1991)

- Relief pitcher
- Born: December 15, 1991 (age 34); Newport News, Virginia, U.S.
- Batted: Left Threw: Left

MLB debut
- May 16, 2014, for the Cleveland Indians

Last MLB appearance
- July 26, 2018, for the Cincinnati Reds

MLB statistics
- Win–loss record: 5–1
- Earned run average: 3.74
- Strikeouts: 73
- Stats at Baseball Reference

Teams
- Cleveland Indians (2014–2017); Cincinnati Reds (2018)

Kyle Richard Crockett (born December 15, 1991) is an American former professional baseball pitcher. He played in Major League Baseball (MLB) for the Cleveland Indians and Cincinnati Reds. He attended the University of Virginia, where he played college baseball for the Virginia Cavaliers.

== Amateur career ==
Crockett attended Poquoson High School in Poquoson, Virginia, and played for the school's baseball team as a teammate of Chad Pinder. In 2009 and 2010, Poquoson won consecutive AA Virginia High School League state championships. He had a 27–0 win‐loss record and was twice named Virginia's high school baseball player of the year.

Crockett enrolled at the University of Virginia, where he played college baseball for the Virginia Cavaliers baseball team in the Atlantic Coast Conference. In three years at Virginia, Crockett had a 1.97 earned run average (ERA), and served as the team's closer in his junior year. In 2012, he played collegiate summer baseball with the Orleans Firebirds of the Cape Cod Baseball League and was named a league all-star.

== Professional career ==
=== Cleveland Indians ===
Before the 2013 Major League Baseball draft, Baseball America rated Crockett as the 103rd best available prospect. The Cleveland Indians selected Crockett in the fourth round, with the 111th overall selection. He signed with Cleveland, forgoing his senior year at Virginia, for a $463,000 signing bonus.

Crockett began his professional career in June 2013 with the Mahoning Valley Scrappers of the Low–A New York–Penn League. After pitching 9 1/3 innings without allowing a run, he received a promotion to the Lake County Captains of the Single–A Midwest League in July. The next month, after pitching in four games for Lake County, he was promoted to the Akron Aeros of the Double–A Eastern League. For the week ending September 3, Crockett was named the organization's minor league player of the week. Crockett pitched 10 1/3 innings for Akron without allowing a run. Crockett only allowed one earned run in the 2013 season.

The Indians assigned Crockett to Akron to start the 2014 season. After pitching to a 0.57 ERA in 15 appearances, they promoted him to the major leagues on May 16. He was the first player from the 2013 Major League Baseball draft to reach the major leagues. Crockett made 43 appearances out of the bullpen in his rookie campaign, recording a 1.80 ERA with 28 strikeouts across 30 innings pitched.

He made 31 appearances for the Indians in 2015, accumulating a 4.08 ERA with 15 strikeouts across 17 2/3 innings. Crockett made 29 outings for Cleveland in 2016, registering a 5.06 ERA with 17 strikeouts in 16 innings of work.

Crockett made only 4 appearances for Cleveland in 2017, struggling to a 10.80 ERA with two strikeouts across 1 2/3 innings. On November 20, 2017, Crockett was designated for assignment by the Indians.

=== Cincinnati Reds ===
On November 27, 2017, Crockett was claimed off waivers by the Cincinnati Reds. He was non-tendered by the Reds and became a free agent on December 1. On December 4, Crockett re-signed with the Reds organization on a minor league contract. He was promoted to the major leagues on June 21, 2018. In 15 games for Cincinnati, Crockett struggled to a 5.79 ERA with 11 strikeouts in 9 1/3 innings. He was designated for assignment on July 27. He cleared waivers and was sent outright to Triple-A Louisville Bats on July 29. In 34 games for the Triple–A Louisville Bats, he recorded a 3.00 ERA with 38 strikeouts across 39 innings pitched. Crockett elected free agency following the season on November 2.

On November 26, 2018, Crockett signed a minor league contract with the Oakland Athletics organization. He was released prior to the start of the season on March 19, 2019, and did not play for a team during the year.

=== Arizona Diamondbacks ===
On December 13, 2019, Crockett signed a minor league contract with the Arizona Diamondbacks. He did not appear for the organization in 2020 due to the cancellation of the minor league season because of the COVID-19 pandemic. Crockett was released by the Diamondbacks on May 22, 2020.

=== Team Texas ===
In July 2020, Crockett signed on to play for Team Texas of the Constellation Energy League (a makeshift 4-team independent league created as a result of the COVID-19 pandemic). He appeared in 14 games for the team, registering an 0-2 record and 3.14 ERA with 22 strikeouts and three saves across 14 1/3 innings pitched.

== Personal life ==
Crockett's brother, Adam, also played for the Poquoson High School baseball team.
