= Wayne Kirby =

American baseball player & coach (born 1964)

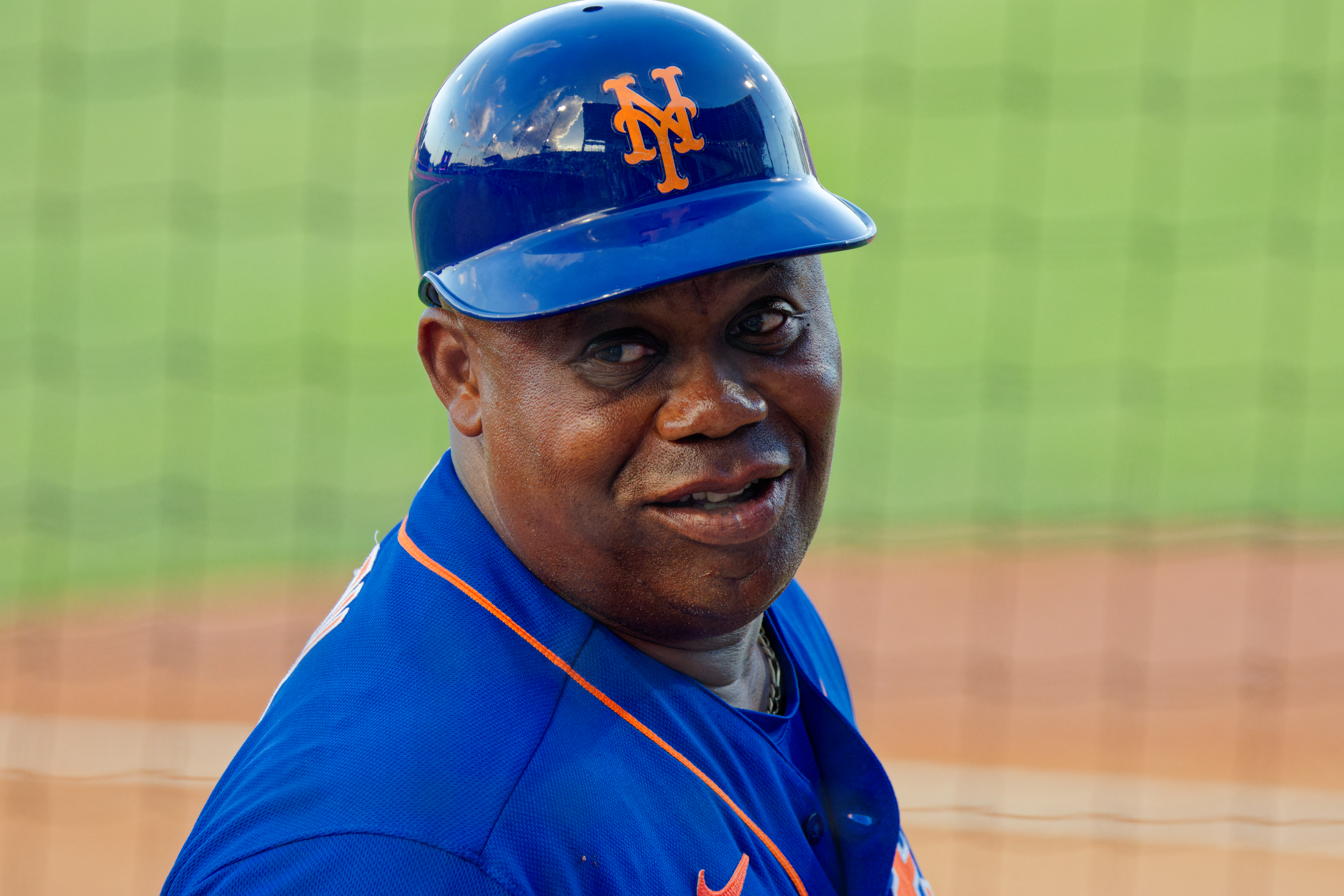
- Kirby with the Mets in 2023
- Born: January 22, 1964 (age 62); Williamsburg, Virginia, U.S.
- Batted: Left Threw: Right

MLB debut
- September 12, 1991, for the Cleveland Indians

Last MLB appearance
- July 17, 1998, for the New York Mets

MLB statistics
- Batting average: .252
- Home runs: 14
- Runs batted in: 119
- Stats at Baseball Reference

Teams
- Cleveland Indians (1991–1996); Los Angeles Dodgers (1996–1997); New York Mets (1998); As Coach: Baltimore Orioles (2011–2018); San Diego Padres (2020–2021); New York Mets (2022–2023)

Wayne Leonard Kirby (born January 22, 1964) is an American former professional baseball right fielder and former coach. He was the outfield/base-running coordinator for the Texas Rangers from 2006 through 2010. From 2011 through 2018, Kirby was the Baltimore Orioles first base and outfield coach. His younger brother is former NFL running back Terry Kirby.

== Career ==
=== Los Angeles Dodgers ===
In the amateur draft of January 1983, Kirby was selected in the 13th round by the Los Angeles Dodgers. Kirby saw action in 60 games with the 1983 Gulf Coast League Dodgers, posting a .292 batting average with 13 runs batted in (RBI) and 23 stolen bases.

Kirby played for three separate minor league teams the following year: the Great Falls Dodgers, the Vero Beach Dodgers and the Bakersfield Dodgers. Combining his stats with each of the three clubs, he batted .281 with one home run, 42 RBI and 38 steals in 119 games. Kirby spent all of 1985 with Vero Beach. In 122 games, he batted .281 and compiled 28 RBI and 31 steals. Kirby returned to Vero Beach again for the 1986 season and he saw action in 114 games. His average fell to .261 as he homered twice, drove in 31 runs and stole 28 bases. Also, he appeared at second base in four games, marking the first time he played a non–outfield position in his minor league career. In 1987, Kirby played for both Bakersfield and the San Antonio Dodgers, seeing action in 129 games (105 for Bakersfield). Between the two teams, he batted .264 with a homer, 43 RBI and 62 stolen bases.

Kirby again split 1988 between Bakersfield and San Antonio, but this time 100 of his 112 total games were with San Antonio. His overall numbers declined, as he batted .244 with 25 runs batted in and 35 steals. In 1989, Kirby saw action in 122 games, 44 with San Antonio and 78 with the Triple–A Albuquerque Dukes. In total, he hit .302, drove in 37 runs and stole 40 bases. Kirby remained with Albuquerque in 1990. In 119 games, he batted .278 and totaled 30 RBI and 29 steals. Curiously, he had compiled the same number of RBI and stolen bases in his 78 games with Albuquerque the prior season.

=== Cleveland Indians ===
Following the 1990 season, Kirby became a free agent and joined the Cleveland Indians. In 118 games for the AAA Colorado Springs Sky Sox, he posted a .294 average with a homer, 39 RBI and 29 steals. Kirby made his big league debut on September 12. He saw action in 21 games for Cleveland and batted .209. In his second season as a member of the Cleveland organization, Kirby again spent most of the year with the Sky Sox. Over 123 games, he batted .345 with 11 home runs, 74 RBI and 51 steals. His offensive success at Colorado Springs did not carry over to the big leagues, as Kirby batted just .167 with a single homer and RBI in 21 games with the 1992 Indians. However, Kirby's HR and RBI totals that season for the Sky Sox were the highest of his minor league career, as were his 162 base hits and his .345 batting average.

=== Baltimore Orioles ===
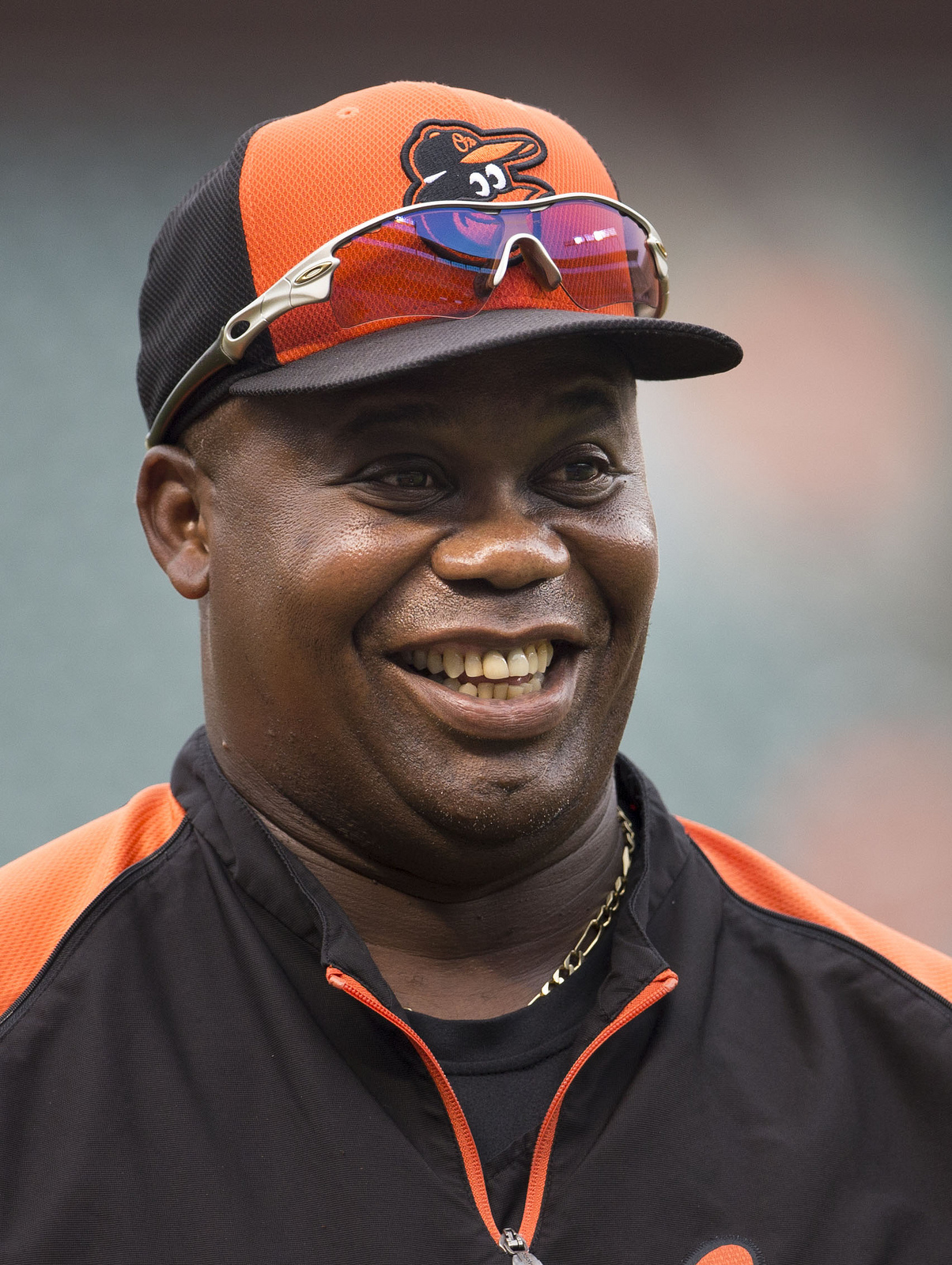
Kirby with the Orioles in 2013

Kirby served as the first base coach for the Baltimore Orioles from 2011 through 2018.

=== San Diego Padres ===
On November 1, 2019, Kirby was hired as the Padres first base coach for the 2020 season under new Manager Jayce Tingler. He was reunited with former Baltimore Orioles Coach Bobby Dickerson (bench coach), former Baltimore Orioles player now turned coach Ryan Flaherty (advance scout and development coach) as well as former Baltimore Orioles third baseman/shortstop Manny Machado.

=== New York Mets ===
On January 5, 2022, Kirby was named first base coach for the New York Mets.

== Personal ==
Kirby attended Tabb High School in Tabb, Virginia.

On July 19, 2022, Kirby underwent prostate cancer surgery.

Sporting positions
| Preceded by John Shelby | Baltimore Orioles First Base Coach; 2011–2018 | Succeeded by Arnie Beyeler |
| Preceded by Skip Schumaker | San Diego Padres First Base Coach; 2020–2021 | Succeeded by David Macias |
| Preceded by Tony Tarasco | New York Mets First Base Coach; 2022 | Succeeded by Incumbent |
