= Reggie Evans (American football) =

American football player (born 1959)

No. 26
- Position: Running back

Personal information
- Born: January 5, 1959 (age 67); Newport News, Virginia, U.S.

Career information
- High school: York (Yorktown, Virginia)
- College: Richmond
- NFL draft: 1982: undrafted

Career history
- Washington Redskins (1982–1983)

Awards and highlights
- Super Bowl champion (XVII)
- Stats at Pro Football Reference

Reginald Leon Evans (born January 5, 1959) is an American former professional football player who was a running back for the Washington Redskins of the National Football League (NFL). He played college football for the Richmond Spiders. He is now coaching in Reston for the Reston Seahawks youth football program.

Evans is the current board chairman of the Fellowship of Christian Athletes for Loudoun County, Virginia and uses his influence as a former professional athlete to help younger athletes make the right choices in their lives as athletes, young men and women, and as followers of Christ. He also spends time mentoring coaches through his experiences and through life experiences of others.

Evans attended York High School in Yorktown, Virginia where he played football, basketball and track and field. He became a Scholastic High School All-American. Besides being All-District in all three sports, he was voted to participate in the Virginia High School All-Star game in football. In track & field, he won a state title in the Long Jump his senior year.
