= Elizabeth Winder =

American writer (b. September 1980)

Elizabeth Winder (born September 1980) is an American author and poet.

== Education ==
Winder grew up in the Queens Lake neighborhood of York County, Virginia. She graduated from Bruton High School and the College of William and Mary and earned an MFA from George Mason University.

== Career ==
Winder has published a collection of poetry. Her first novel, Pain, Parties and Work (2013) is a biography of Sylvia Plath. She relies on interviews with Plath's Mademoiselle colleagues to "paint a rather different image of Plath from the one most readers are familiar with". The book is structured more like a magazine, with sidebars describing products and fashion from the time period, as well as excerpts from Plath's journals.

Winder's 2017 book Marilyn in Manhattan focused on 1955, with Newsday calling it "an approach that falls squarely within the popular subgenre of micro-biography". The New York Times review said "rarely has a book about Marilyn Monroe been more maddening" and the St. Louis Post-Dispatch review said the book's market might be "slender" and critiqued Winder's confusing use of first names only, while Publishers Weekly called it a "captivating look" at Monroe's escape from Los Angeles.
