= Chris Luzar =

American football player (born 1979)

No. 89
- Position: Tight end

Personal information
- Born: February 12, 1979 (age 47); Newport News, Virginia, U.S.
- Listed height: 6 ft 7 in (2.01 m)
- Listed weight: 265 lb (120 kg)

Career information
- High school: Lafayette (Williamsburg, Virginia)
- College: Virginia (1997–2001)
- NFL draft: 2002: 4th round, 118th overall pick

Career history
- Jacksonville Jaguars (2002–2004); New York Giants (2005)*; New England Patriots (2006)*
- * Offseason or practice squad member only

Career NFL statistics
- Receptions: 4
- Receiving yards: 35
- Receiving TDs: 0
- Stats at Pro Football Reference

Christopher Myers Luzar (born February 12, 1979) is an American former professional football player who was a tight end for the Jacksonville Jaguars of the National Football League (NFL). He was also a member of the New York Giants and New England Patriots but did not play in any games with either team. He was selected by the Jaguars in the fourth round of the 2002 NFL draft.

== Early life ==
Luzar attended Lafayette High School in Williamsburg, Virginia.

== College career ==
Luzar played college football for the Virginia Cavaliers from 1997 to 2001. He was redshirted in 1997. He caught three passes for nine yards in 1998, 8 passes for 60 yards in 1999, nine passes for 149 yards in 2000, and 33 passes for 380 yards in 2001. Overall, he caught 53 passes for 598 yards during his college career, but did not score a touchdown. Luzar graduated from Virginia with a degree in studio art. His brother Kase also played with him at Virginia.

== Professional career ==
Luzar was selected by the Jacksonville Jaguars in the fourth round, with the 118th overall pick, of the 2002 NFL draft. He officially signed with the team on June 20, 2002. He played in 12 games for the Jaguars in 2002, catching one pass for five yards. Luzar appeared in 11 games, starting one, during the 2003 season, recording three receptions for 30 yards. He was waived/injured on September 5, 2004 and reverted to injured reserve the following day. He was waived by the Jaguars on November 2, 2004.

Luzar signed a reserve/ future contract with the New York Giants on January 21, 2005. He was waived on September 4, 2005.

Nearly a year later, Luzar was signed by the New England Patriots on August 18, 2006. He was waived by the Patriots on September 1, 2006.
