= Monstah Black =

"Monstah Black" (né Reginald Ellis Crump) is an American recording artist, choreographer, dancer, and performance artist, based in Bedford–Stuyvesant, Brooklyn in New York City. In 2015, he received the Tom Murrin Performance Award.

== Early life and education ==
Monstah Black's birth name is Reginald Ellis Crump. He was born in Colonial Williamsburg, Virginia. Black attended Long Island University and received a degree in new media art and performance Master of Fine Art Degree Program.

Black started performing at the age of five. He attended Bruton High School, Williamsburg, where he performed the song "International Lover" by Prince. He describes his adolescence as one of both struggles and "joyful moments", and describes his teen years as "progressive, alternative, androgynous". His fashion aesthetic was influenced by Prince, Boy George and the New York Dolls.

== Career ==
Black 2016 show 'HYPBERLOIC! (the last spectacle)' was described by Eric Marlin, in the New York Theater Review, as "more visual than verbal, more collage than narrative", where "not every fragment must be in the service of a central thesis." Black creates funk, electro/pop/soul, disco infused punk music.

== Personal life ==
Black is gay and he is married to D.J. and producer Manchildblack. As "The Illustrious Blacks", they have collaborated on music recordings, such as the EP, "NeoAfro Futuristic Psychedelic Surrealistic Hippy” released on Concierge Records, and the 2016 live performance “Hyperbolic”.

== Awards ==
- 2015 Tom Murrin Performance Award, Dixon Place
