= Alenka Luzar =

Slovenian-American physical chemist (died 2019)

Alenka Luzar (1954 – March 5, 2019) was a Slovenian-American physical chemist known for her research on the dynamics of hydrogen bonds in water.

== Education and career ==
Luzar is originally from Ljubljana, and as a teenager was a member of the Slovenian junior national ski team at the Junior Olympic games associated with the 1968 Winter Olympics in Grenoble. She was educated at the University of Ljubljana, completing her Ph.D. there in 1983.

She was a faculty member at the university from 1983 until 1992, while at the same time performing postdoctoral research at the University of Puerto Rico, Stony Brook University, and the University of California, Berkeley, where she worked with David Chandler. She continued as a research scientist at the University of California, Berkeley from 1992 to 1997, and took a faculty position at the University of California, San Francisco in 1998. She moved to Virginia Commonwealth University in 2004.

== Service ==
Luzar was the editor-in-chief of the Journal of Molecular Liquids from 2016 until her death. She chaired the 2018 Gordon Research Conference on Water and Aqueous solutions.

== Recognition ==
Luzar became a Fellow of the American Physical Society in 2008, a Fellow of the American Association for the Advancement of Science in 2010, and a Fellow of the Royal Society of Chemistry in 2017.
