= Paul Winfree =

American economist

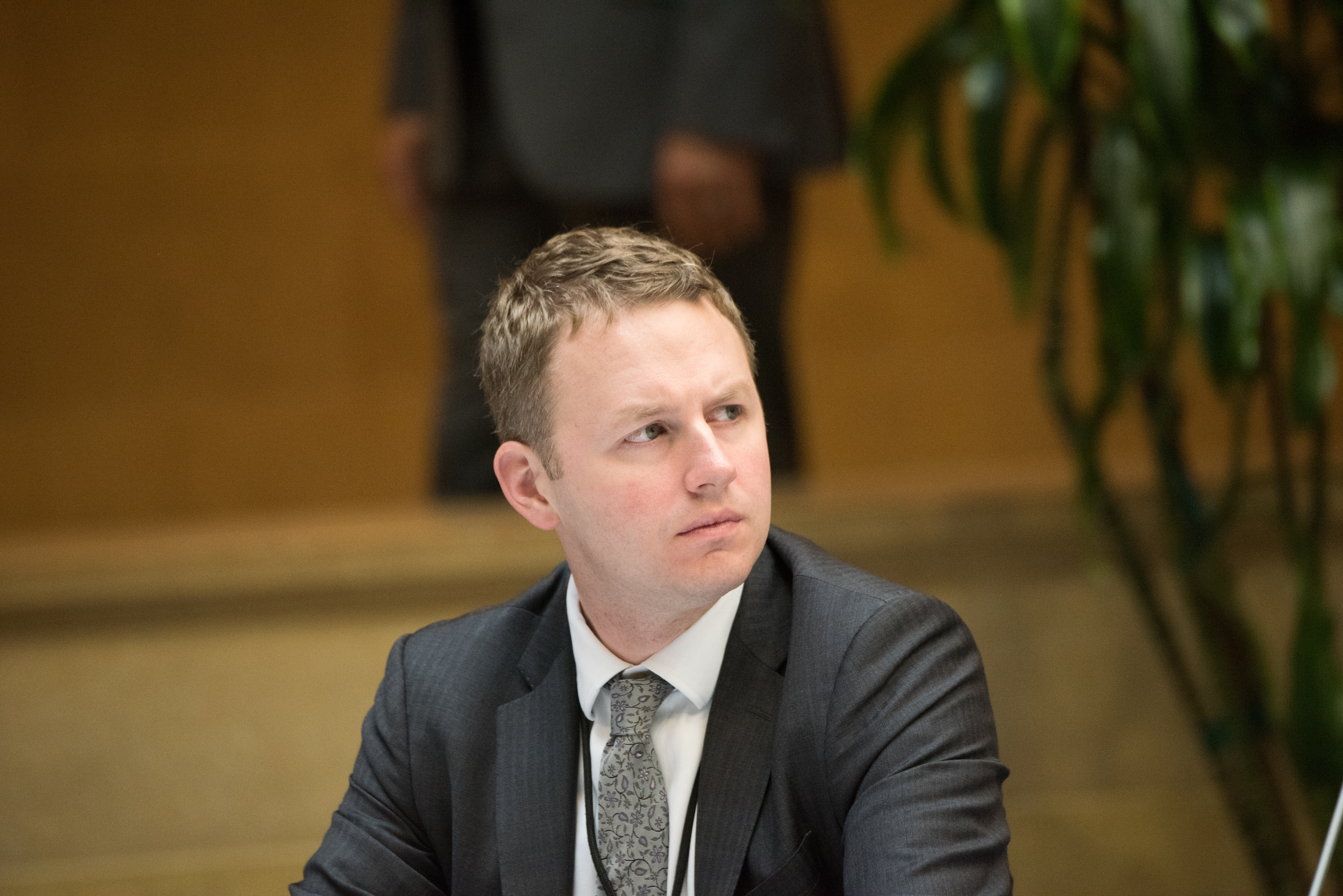
- Born: June 8
- Education: George Mason University (BS); London School of Economics (MSc); Queen's University Belfast (PhD)
- Political party: Republican
- Children: 3

Paul Winfree (born June 8) was Deputy Assistant to the President for domestic policy, Deputy Director of the Domestic Policy Council, and Director of Budget Policy in the Trump administration. He was also formerly^{[unfit]} the distinguished fellow in economic policy and public leadership at The Heritage Foundation. In addition, he was director of the Thomas A. Roe Institute for Economic Policy Studies and the Richard F. Aster Fellow at the Heritage Foundation. Winfree was chair of the Fulbright Foreign Scholarship Board from 2020 until 2022.

== Education ==
Winfree has a Ph.D. in economics from Queen's University Belfast where his research focused on the development of the U.S. political economy during the late-nineteenth and early-twentieth centuries. Winfree also has a master's degree from the London School of Economics and a bachelor's degree from George Mason University.

== Career ==
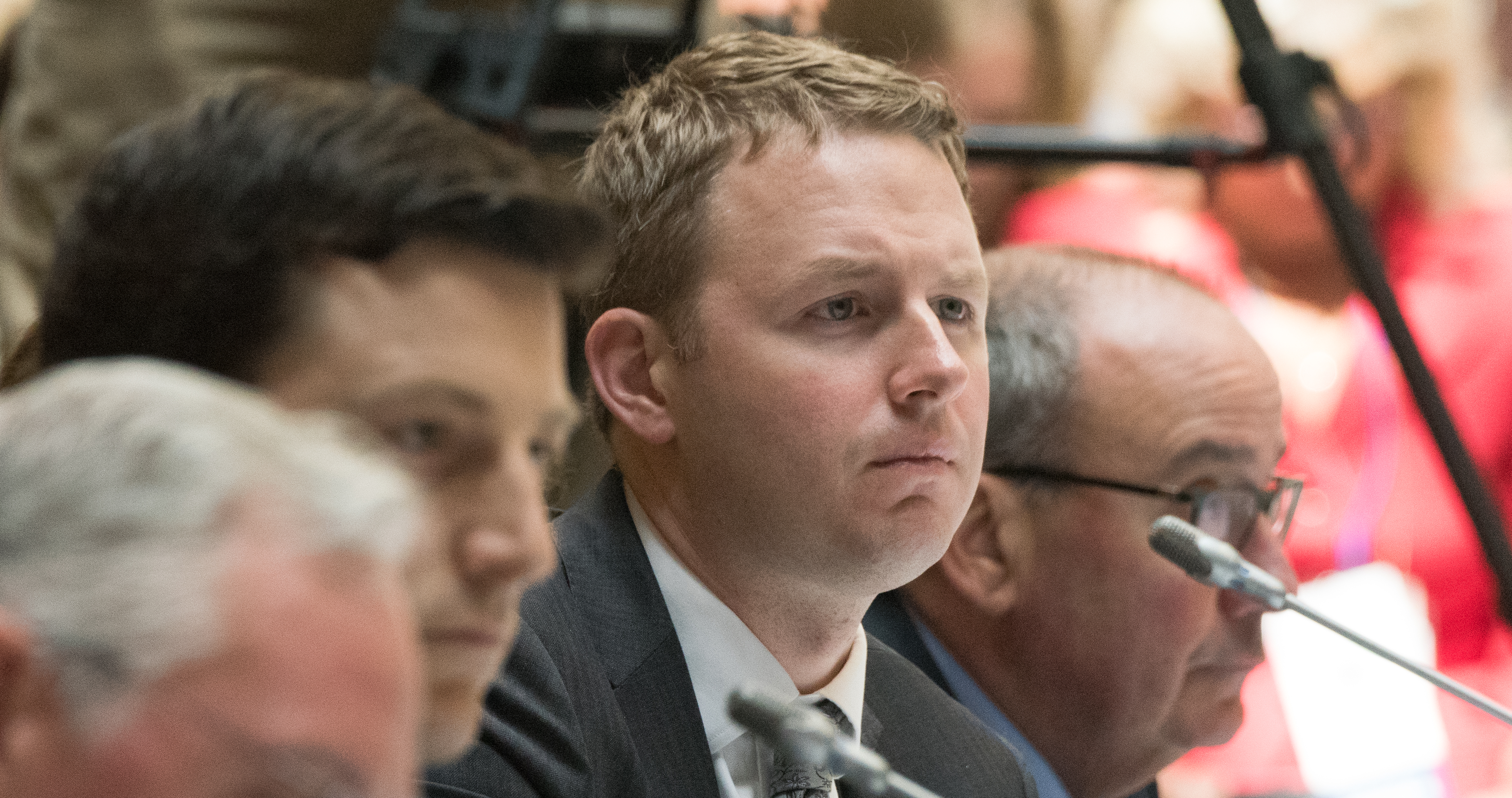
Paul Winfree

In 2006, Winfree took a job at the Heritage Foundation, where he researched issues of economic mobility and coauthored a book on that topic published by the Pew Charitable Trusts.

Between 2011 and 2015, Winfree was director of income security at the Senate Budget Committee. In this capacity, he contributed to implementing deficit-neutral risk corridor legislation in the Affordable Care Act.

In 2015, Winfree returned to the Heritage Foundation, serving as Director of the Thomas A. Roe Institute for Economic Policy Studies, the Center for Data Analysis, as well as becoming the inaugural Richard F. Aster Fellow. His research focused on public finance and economic modeling. In this capacity, he was lead-authoring the 165-page "Blueprint for Balance" proposal, which later became an important idea-giver for the Trump transition team, of which Winfree eventually became a part of.

During the 2016 presidential transition, Winfree worked alongside Linda M. Springer, a member of the George W. Bush administration, seeking to achieve a more direct political impact. In November 2016, he stated that President-elect Trump was highly interested in questions of domestic policy.

He became the Deputy Assistant to the President for Domestic Policy, the Deputy Director of the Domestic Policy Council, and the Director of Budget Policy in January 2017. Winfree and former OMB Director Mick Mulvaney were lead authors of the administration's budget proposition.

Winfree also authored and led the administration of the President's Executive Order number 13781, with the objective of establishing "A Comprehensive Plan for Reorganizing the Executive Branch." Winfree was also the author of the Executive Order number 13828 on "Reducing poverty in America by promoting opportunity and economic mobility."

He left the White House and returned to Heritage at the end of 2017, in a move which was anticipated by media and policy experts in Washington.

Winfree also was founder and president of N58 Policy Research, a firm that provided analytical research and strategy for decision makers in matters of public policy.

Winfree is the author of a book on the evolution of economic and fiscal policy from colonial America until the present called The History (and Future) of the Budget Process in the United States: Budget by Fire (Palgrave Macmillan, 2019).

In 2019, Winfree was appointed by President Trump to the Fulbright Foreign Scholarship Board. During Winfree's three terms as Fulbright board chair from 2020 until 2022, he established partnerships between the Fulbright Program, universities, and other top institutions. These include initiatives between Fulbright, the U.S. National Archives, and the U.S. National Park Service that expanded scholarship related to cultural, historical, and environmental conservation. Winfree received a distinguished service award from the US State Department's Bureau of Education and Culture Affairs for his "stewardship during the COVID-19 pandemic, and for meaningful contributions to advance mutual understanding through the Fulbright Program."

In 2023, Winfree authored the chapter on the Federal Reserve for the ninth edition of the Heritage Foundation's book Mandate for Leadership, which provided the policy agenda for Project 2025.

From 2023 to 2026, Winfree was the president and CEO of the Economic Policy Innovation Center. The Center ceased operations on June 1, 2026, after he left to serve as an adviser to Chairman Kevin Warsh at the Federal Reserve.

== Personal background ==
Winfree is from Williamsburg, Virginia, where he once worked as a cooper's apprentice at the colonial town's historical district. He is married and has three children.
