= Tabb High School =

Location
- 4431 Bethel road Yorktown, Virginia 23693; United States; 37°07′26″N 76°26′02″W

Information
- School type: Public high school
- Founded: 1972
- School district: York County School Division
- Superintendent: James Carroll
- Principal: Mr. Dennis Zollicoffer
- Staff: Everyone
- Grades: 9–12
- Enrollment: 1,183 (2016-17)
- Language: English
- Colors: Black and orange
- Athletics conference: Virginia High School League; Bay Rivers District; Region I
- Mascot: Tiger
- Rivals: Grafton High School; York High School; Poquoson High School
- Newspaper: The Tiger Times
- Communities served: Tabb, Virginia
- Website: Official site

Tabb High School is a public high school located in Tabb, an unincorporated community in southern York County, Virginia, United States. It is part of the York County School Division. The school opened in 1972 and is located near the site of one of the first land battles of the Civil war, the Battle of Big Bethel.

Athletic teams compete in the Virginia High School League's AA Bay Rivers District in Region I. Historically, Tabb High School has been known for its football program, which was dominant in the early 1990s and produced two players for the NFL, Chris Slade and Terry Kirby. The Tiger football team won VHSL Group AA state championships in 1981, '87, and '90.

== History ==
Tabb opened in the fall of 1972. It was without a senior class, and did not have a graduation ceremony until the spring of 1974.

It was considered cutting-edge for its time. It had carpeting, movable walls, air conditioning, and two large rooms called kivas in which the teacher worked from the lowest level with five ascending rows in front and on either side. The gymnasium floor was made of Tartan, a rubber surface, which was considered unusual for its time.

The school opened to rave reviews from students, parents and the architectural community. It helped ease overcrowding in York High School.

Tabb made the playoffs for the first time in 15 years in the '08-'09 football season. The girls' field hockey team won the state championship in the '08-'09 season, '09-'10 season, '10-'11 season, and '11-'12 season, leaving the school with a "four in a row" state championship. They won again in '14, '15, '16, and '21 making eight state championship titles in ten seasons.

== Accreditation ==
Tabb High is fully accredited by the Virginia Department of Education and has been accredited by the Southern Association of Colleges and Schools since 1972.

== Athletics ==
Tabb High School fields teams in the following sports. They compete in the AA Bay Rivers District in AA Region I.

- Basketball (boys' and girls')
- Baseball
- Cheer, competition and sideline
- Color guard (winter guard)
- Cross country
- eSports
- Field hockey
- Football
- Golf (boys' and girls')
- Lacrosse
- Soccer (boys' and girls')
- Softball
- Swimming/diving (boys' and girls')
- Tennis (boys' and girls')
- Track, indoor and outdoor (boys' and girls')
- Volleyball
- Wrestling

== Feeder patterns ==
Its original drawing area ran from Bethel Manor to Seaford.

The school takes in students from the following elementary schools:

- Bethel Manor
- Coventry (partial)
- Grafton Bethel (partial)
- Mount Vernon
- Tabb

All students zoned to Tabb Middle School are zoned to Tabb High School.

== Notable alumni ==
- Terry Kirby - former National Football League running back
- Wayne Kirby - former Major League Baseball right fielder
- Justin Melton - Philippine Basketball Association point guard
- Lori Robinson - A four-star general in the U.S. Air Force and the first woman to lead a top-tier U.S. Combat Command
- Chris Slade - former National Football League linebacker
- Levar Stoney - Mayor of Richmond Virginia
- Dave Walters - swimmer, world record holder (relay) and 2008 Olympic gold medalist
