= Williamsburg-James City County Public Schools =

School division in Virginia, US

Address
- 117 Ironbound Road Williamsburg, Virginia, 23185; United States

District information
- Grades: PK-12
- Superintendent: Daniel Keever
- Schools: 16
- NCES District ID: 5104020

Students and staff
- Students: 11,402 (2023-24)
- Teachers: 821.12 (FTE)
- Student–teacher ratio: 13.89

Other information
- Website: wjccschools.org

The Williamsburg-James City County Public Schools (locally known also as WJCC) is a combined public school division which serves the independent city of Williamsburg and James City County in the Virginia Peninsula area of the Hampton Roads region in southeastern Virginia.

The system consists of approximately 11,300 students in 16 schools, of which there are 9 elementary schools, 4 middle schools, 5 pree schools, and 3 high schools. The system employs 800 instructional staff members and over 600 support staff members.

== History ==
The district formed in the mid-1950s when the city and county systems combined.

A new middle school and a ninth elementary school were opened and began operating in September 2010, at the start of the 2010–11 school year.

The Williamsburg-James City County Public Schools system (known informally as "WJCC"), as of 2020, has approximately 11,300 students in 16 schools—9 elementary schools, 4 middle schools, and 3 high schools. Within the county's boundaries there are two established high schools, Lafayette, and Jamestown. A third high school, Warhill, opened in the Lightfoot area in August 2007. The ninth elementary school, JB Blayton, opened in 2010 along with the new middle school to replace James Blair, Lois S. Hornsby Middle School. In 2018, James Blair Middle School opened, to be the most recent school to open in the WJCC Schools district.

=== Covid-19 ===
Covid-19 put a stop to classes during the 2019-2020 school year, forcing classes to be held online during the remainder of spring of 2020. The school year was able to be carried out with relative ease, but the district would need to make changes for the upcoming 2020-2021 school year.

The Virginia Department of Education, Centers for Disease Control and Prevention, and state and local health experts collaborated to figure out 4 different learning paths for students for 2020-2021. The first path had students work from home and get their assignments through remote instruction. The second path had students alternating days between getting in-person instruction and remote instruction. The third path also has students alternating, but it is based on schedules rather than days. The last option is on-site learning taking place Monday through Friday.

No later than 10 days after this plan was made, the district had to scrap it due to the growing severity of Covid-19. For the first nine weeks of school, students would be required to learn over online instruction. This way of learning is different than that of the Spring, because attendance and participation would now be graded. Due to the decision being made to have the first semester virtual, parents might want to change the learning path for their child. The school district reopened registration for families to opt in and out of.

The district also had to figure out a way to provide meals to students, because many parents relied on the schools to feed their children. WJCC public schools would start distributing grab-and-go breakfast and lunch meals during Covid-19 starting March 2020. Students would be eligible to receive free meals until June 30, 2021. These meals were paid for by U.S. Department of Agriculture's Summer Food Service Program. 9,512 meals were distributed in the first week of January, and more than 386,000 were given out since March 16, 2020. Meals were bagged and organized in plastic crates. The students could reheat their meal when they got home.

Covid-19 would also prevent parents from watching their child play in sporting events, which would cause some backlash. Furthermore, junior varsity teams were not able to even be formed. At least three members on the WJCC school board and over 10 members of the public voiced their concerns over being able to watch their children play in sporting events. Due to the pandemic, they suggest starting with zero spectators being allowed to watch events, but they would look into it as seasons progressed. There would later be access watch the events online.

The academics of students took a toll during the 2020-2021 school year. Based on standardized testing results, the average student is behind academically by seven months, while Black and Hispanic students are behind by 10 months. Furthermore, the pandemic widened racial and socioeconomic gaps as it highlights lack of computer and internet access.

== Governance ==
The school board has seven members - two from Williamsburg and five from James City County.

== Demographics ==
As of circa 2015, of the 11,000 students, about 1,100 (about 10%) live in Williamsburg and the remainder are in James City County.

== Schools ==
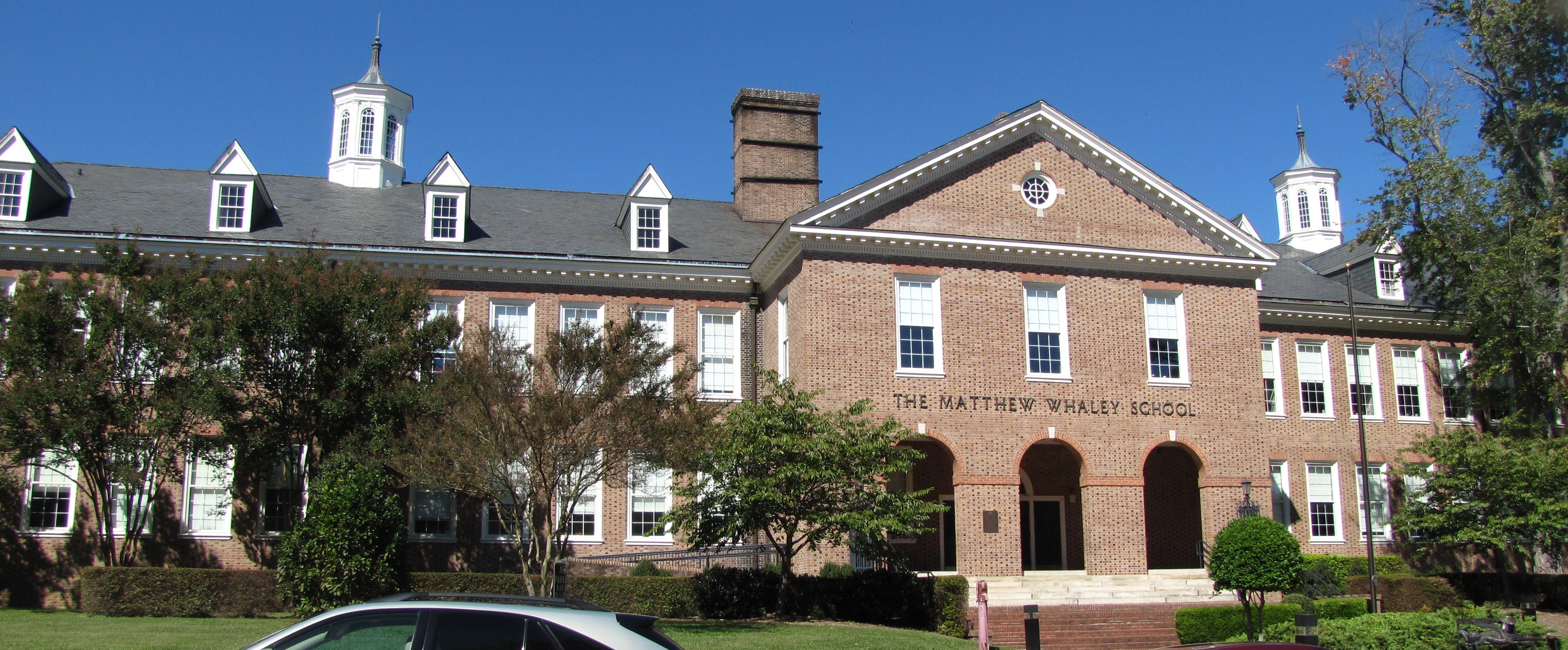
Matthew Whaley Elementary School

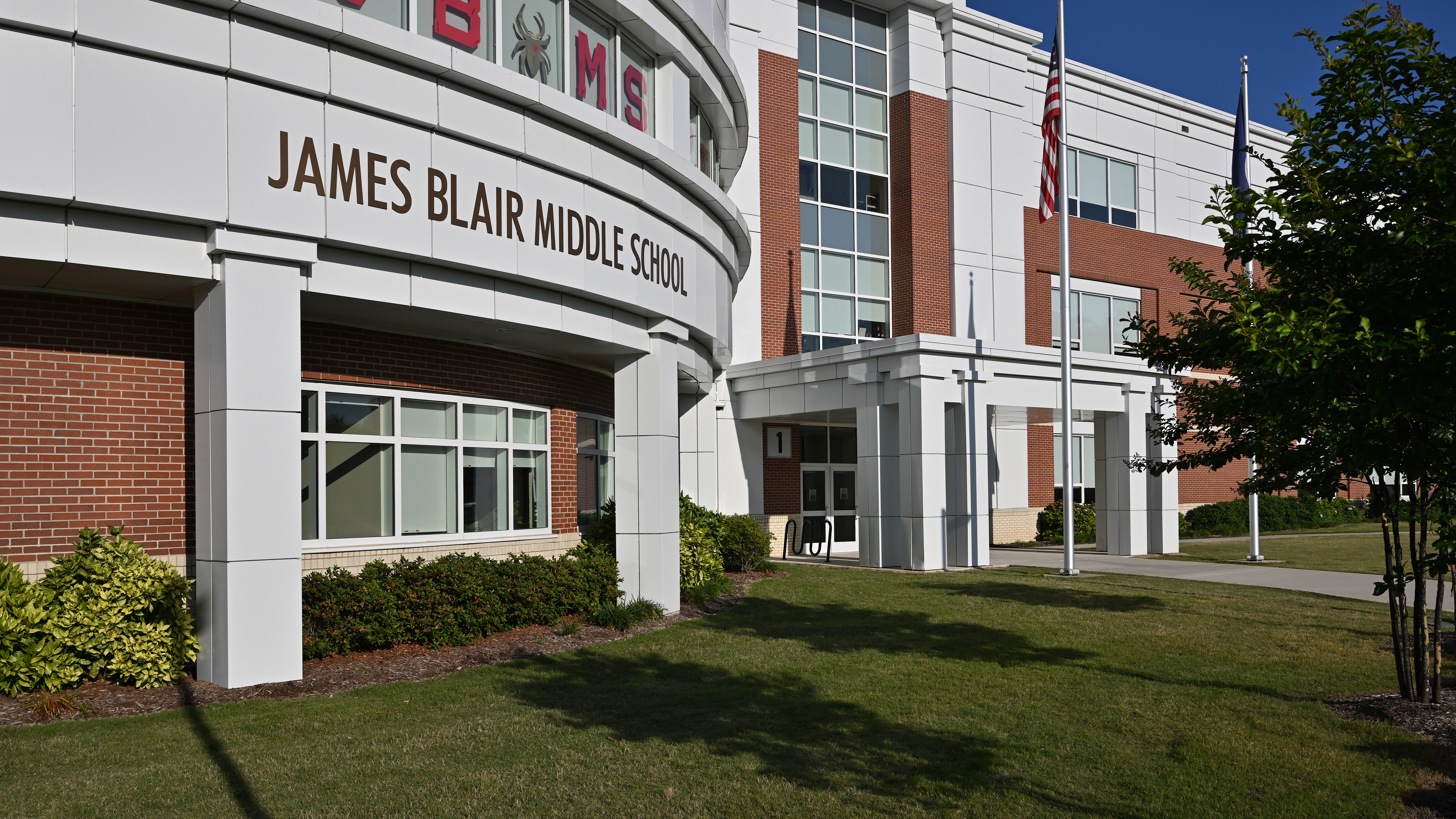
James Blair Middle School entrance, Williamsburg, VA

High schools

All high schools hold students in grades 9–12.

- Jamestown High School
- Lafayette High School
- Warhill High School

Middle schools

All middle schools hold students in grades 6–8.

- Berkeley Middle School (Williamsburg)
- James Blair Middle School (Williamsburg)
- Toano Middle School
- Lois S. Hornsby Middle School

Elementary schools

All elementary schools hold students in grades K–5.

- Clara Byrd Baker Elementary School
- J. Blaine Blayton Elementary School
- James River Elementary School
  - Located in the Grove Community in the county's southeastern end, James River is a magnet school. It offers the International Baccalaureate Primary Years Programme, one of only five such schools Virginia to do so.
- Laurel Lane Elementary School
- Matoaka Elementary School
- D.J. Montague Elementary School
- Norge Elementary School
- Stonehouse Elementary School
- Matthew Whaley Elementary School (Williamsburg)

James River Elementary School, located in the Grove Community in the county's southeastern end, is a magnet school. It offers the IB Primary Years Programme, one of only five such schools Virginia as of October, 2006.

Clara Byrd Baker, a public elementary school in Williamsburg, was opened in September 1989. Originally built to house 600 students, it was expanded in 1992 to increase its capacity to 800 students.

The three high schools, all of which are within the county's borders (though they have Williamsburg addresses), are Jamestown, Lafayette, and Warhill High Schools. All are considered above average institutions. For the 2001–2002 academic year, the public school system was ranked among the top five school systems in the Commonwealth of Virginia and in the top 15% nationwide by Expansion Management Magazine. There are also two regional Governor's Schools in the area that serve gifted and talented students.

=== Changes for 2010–11 school year ===
As of the 2010–11 school year, a new 9th elementary and a new middle school (replacing James Blair Middle School) opened. Although planned to operate separately, the two schools are adjacently-located off Jolly Pond Road near the present county school bus garage.

The new schools were formally dedicated on October 2, 2010. An audience of close to 100 people joined the school board, members of the James City County Board of Supervisors and Williamsburg City Council and the families of the namesakes for the ceremony. The new schools are:

- J. Blaine Blayton Elementary School, named in honor of Dr. J. Blaine Blayton, an African American physician and civic leader who lived in the Grove community in James City County. Dr. Blayton was a supporter of public education and the first African American to serve on the James City County school board. His son, Oscar, was the first African American undergrad to attend the College of William and Mary.
- Lois S Hornsby Middle School, named for Mrs. Lois Hornsby, a philanthropist who has lived in Williamsburg for more than five decades. Ms. Hornsby is the mother of musician Bruce Hornsby and widow of lawyer and real estate developer Robert Hornsby, Sr.

The newest middle school, Hornsby, will effectively replace James Blair Middle School. The Blair complex was originally built as a high school, and is one of the school division's older structures. For the 2010–11 school year and the immediate future, the division plans to operate only 3 middle schools, although a newer portion of the Blair complex is scheduled to be modified to accommodate the Academy for Life & Learning, an alternative education program for older students. The school system's central administration will utilize the larger, remaining portion of Blair for its offices. While current facilities will be adequate to meet most of the system's needs, a future renovation of the Blair complex for reuse as a middle school is anticipated, possibly by 2017.

=== New school for 2017–2018 school year ===
In 2017, a new middle school will be built on the James Blair site, with plans to be opened in fall 2018. The WJCC School Board accepted a proposal by the Superintendent on October 21, 2014. The proposal includes two phases. In the first phase, a new building will be constructed beside the current James Blair school building. In the second phase, the old building will be demolished and a new building will be constructed in its place. The final project will cost around $40 million and house around 900 students.
