= Grafton High School (Virginia) =

Coordinates: 37°9′49.3″N 76°28′11.4″W

Location
- 403 Grafton Drive; Yorktown, Virginia 23692; United States

Information
- School type: Public high school
- Founded: 1996
- School district: York County School Division
- Superintendent: Victor D. Shandor, Ed.D.
- Principal: Stephen Gavin
- Grades: 9–12
- Enrollment: 1281 (2023-24)
- Language: English
- Colors: Blue, Silver, and Red
- Athletics conference: Virginia High School League; Bay Rivers District; Region I
- Mascot: Clippers
- Rival: Tabb High School
- Website: Official Site

Grafton High School is a public high school located in Grafton, an unincorporated section of York County, Virginia. It is part of the York County School Division. The school opened on September 3, 1996 and shares a facility with Grafton Middle School, the only shared facility of this type in the Hampton Roads area, and the largest building in York County at the time of its construction. Athletic teams compete in the Virginia High School League's AA Bay Rivers, District, and in Region I. Grafton High School was awarded a silver medal by U.S. News & World Report in the 2008 America’s Best High Schools search.

== Fire ==
On February 3, 2020 an electrical fire broke out at the school complex just before 4pm, shutting the school down (anticipated to be through May 2020). Classes at both schools were moved to local Tabb Middle and York High, respectively. Students and teachers from Grafton used those buildings on Tuesdays, Thursdays, and Saturdays until schools became virtual in March 2020.

== Accreditation ==
Grafton High is fully accredited by the Virginia Department of Education and has been accredited by the Southern Association of Colleges and Schools since its inception in 1996.

== Athletics ==
Grafton High fields varsity teams in these sports:

Boys and Girls

- Forensics
- Debate
- Basketball
- Cross-Country
- Swimming
- Soccer
- Tennis
- Indoor/Outdoor Track
- Golf
- Lacrosse (Club)
- Marching Band
- Fire Dancing

Boys

- Baseball
- Football
- Wrestling
- Volleyball (Club)

Girls

- Cheerleading
- Field Hockey
- Softball
- Volleyball

Grafton has seven team state titles, one in field hockey (2002) one in boys outdoor track (2010) four in competition cheer (2013, 2016, 2017, 2018) and one in men's swimming (2014). Grafton also has individual AA state champions in Boys Cross Country (2009,2010), Boys Indoor Track (2007, 2010, 2011), Girls Outdoor Track (2008), Boys Outdoor Track (2010, 2011), Girls Swimming, Boys Tennis (2004, 2005, 2006), and Wrestling (2005, 2008). Two club sports, Boys and Girls lacrosse, are also offered by the school.

2010 Boys Outdoor Track Team

The Grafton High School Boys Track Team were awarded the 2010 VHSL AA Outdoor State Team Championship after placing 4th at the State Cross-Country Championships and only getting a 5th place spot during the Indoor Track season. The boys were able to score 46.5pts and earn a 1st Place podium spot. Point scorers for Grafton were: Kyle King – 16pts, Dwayne Stover – 13.5pts, David Gunnerson – 10pts, Brian Gorwitz – 7pts. Members who ran this weekend were: Brian Wilmer, Brian Gorwitz, David Gunnerson, Paul Tyler, Rehan Talibi, Ben Hoppe, Conor Wallace, Kyle King, Matt Garcia, Brent Bass, and Dwayne Stover. Notable performances include:Kyle King 2nd, Brian Gorwitz 7th in the 3200mIn the 4x800 Meter Relay – 11th (Ben Hoppe, Brian Wilmer, Paul Tyler, Matt Garcia) Dwayne Stover – tied for 5th place in the High Jump, David Gunnerson 3rd, Brian Gorwitz 4th in the 1600m, Dwayne Stover 1st – the only individual champion of the weekend in the 400m, Kyle King 2nd, David Gunnerson 5th in the 800m, 4x400 Meter Relay – 12th (Conor Wallace, Rehan Talibi, David Gunnerson, and Dwayne Stover). All these athletes made it possible for the Clippers to get onto the team podium for the first time in the history of Grafton High School.

== Notable alumni ==
- Trey Gibson, American baseball player
- Christian Taylor, American football coach

== Band ==
Grafton High School has three bands: Concert Band, Symphonic Band, and Wind Ensemble. Grafton also has a Jazz Band and Percussion Ensemble. Grafton also has a marching band. The marching band is class AAAAA. The band has consistently been a Virginia Honor Band for the past 16 years.

== Feeder patterns ==
The following elementary schools feed into GHS:

- Coventry Elementary School
- Dare Elementary School (partial)
- Grafton-Bethel Elementary School

All residents zoned to Grafton Middle School are zoned to Grafton High School.
