= York County School Division =

School district in York County, Virginia

Location
- York County, Virginia

District information
- Type: Public, school division
- Motto: Embrace, Engage, Empower
- Grades: PK – 12
- Superintendent: Dr. James Carroll (2026)
- Budget: $206.0m (FY2027)

Students and staff
- Students: 13,221 (2025–26)
- Staff: 1,902.22 FTE (FY2025)

Other information
- Website: yorkcountyschools.org

The York County School Division or YCSD is a school division (school district) in York County, Virginia, United States. During the 2025–26 school year, the division enrolled 13,221 students across 19 schools, comprising 10 elementary schools, four middle schools, four high schools, and one charter school. In fiscal year 2025, the division reported approximately 1,900 full-time-equivalent employees.

== Governance ==
York County School Division is run by a five-member School Board of elected officials, one from each of the county's five election districts. The policies of the School Board are implemented by a superintendent.

=== School Board ===
- Mark J. Shafer
- Zoran Pajevic (Chair)
- Kimberly S. Goodwin
- James E. Richardson (Vice Chair)
- Lynda J. Fairman

=== Superintendent ===
James Carroll has served as superintendent of the York County School Division since March 2026. Carroll joined the division in 2014 as chief human resources officer and later served as chief operations officer. Following the retirement of Victor D. Shandor in 2025, Carroll was appointed interim superintendent before being unanimously selected by the York County School Board to serve as superintendent on a permanent basis in March 2026.

== Schools ==
=== Elementary schools ===
- Bethel Manor Elementary School
- Coventry Elementary School
- Dare Elementary School
- Grafton Bethel Elementary School
- Magruder Elementary School
- Mt. Vernon Elementary School
- Seaford Elementary School
- Tabb Elementary School
- Waller Mill Elementary School
- Yorktown Elementary School

=== Middle schools ===
- Grafton Middle School
- Queens Lake Middle School
- Tabb Middle School
- Yorktown Middle School

=== High schools ===
- Bruton High School
- Grafton High School
- Tabb High School
- York High School

=== Charter school ===
- York River Academy
