= Flossie =

Flossie may refer to:

- Flossie, a Venus of Fifteen, an 1897 English erotic novel
- Tropical Storm Flossie (disambiguation)

== People with the given name Flossie ==
- Flossie Page (1893–2006), American supercentenarian
- Flossie Wong-Staal (1947–2020), Chinese-American virologist and molecular biologist

== Animals ==
- Flossie (cat) (1995–), British domestic cat which is currently the oldest verified cat alive

== See also ==
- Floss (disambiguation)
- Flossy
