= Virginia State Route 171 =

State highway in Virginia, United States

State Route 171

Route information
- Maintained by VDOT
- Length: 11.19 mi (18.01 km)
- Existed: 1933–present

Major junctions
- West end: SR 143 in Newport News
- I-64 in Newport News; US 17 in Tabb
- East end: Dead end at Back River in Poquoson

Location
- Country: United States
- State: Virginia
- Counties: City of Newport News, York, City of Poquoson

Highway system
- Virginia Routes; Interstate; US; Primary; Secondary; Byways; History; HOT lanes
← SR 170	→ SR 172

State Route 171 (SR 171) is a primary state highway in the U.S. state of Virginia. The state highway runs 11.19 miles (18.01 km) from SR 143 in Newport News east to a dead end at the Back River in Poquoson. SR 171 connects Poquoson with Interstate 64 (I-64), U.S. Route 17 (US 17), and Newport News via the York County community of Tabb.

== Route description ==
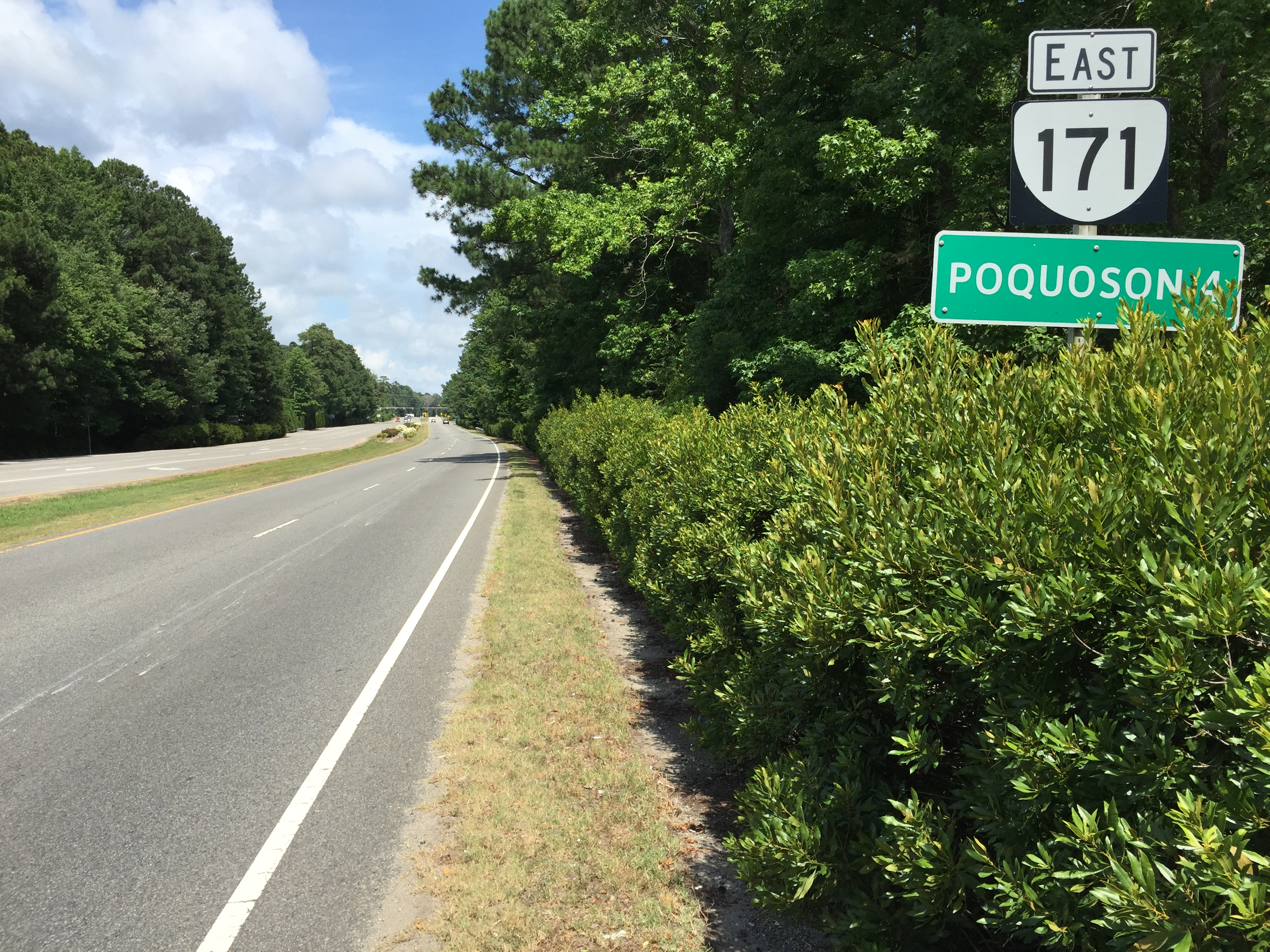
View east along SR 171 at US 17 in Tabb

SR 171 begins as Oyster Point Road at an intersection with SR 143 (Jefferson Avenue) in the city of Newport News. Oyster Point Road continues west as an unnumbered highway to US 60. The state highway heads east as a six-lane divided highway that meets I-64 at a cloverleaf interchange, where the highway's name changes to Victory Boulevard. SR 171 continues east as an eight-lane highway along the edge of the Kiln Creek planned community on the boundary between Newport News and York County, which is accessed by a pair of intersections with Kiln Creek Parkway. The state highway has intersections with US 17 (George Washington Memorial Highway) and SR 134 (Hampton Highway) in the older community of Tabb.

SR 171 gradually loses lanes while passing through Tabb, finally reducing to a two-lane undivided road on a four-lane right-of-way a short distance east of SR 134. The state highway intersects SR 600 (Big Bethel Road) and passes through a forested area before and after crossing the western city limit of Poquoson. At its intersection with SR 172 (Wythe Creek Road), SR 171's name changes to Little Florida Road. East of the center of the city, the state highway veers onto Poquoson Avenue, a curvy road that gradually turns south. SR 171 turns east onto Messick Road, which veers south through marshland west of Plum Tree Island National Wildlife Refuge. The state highway reaches its eastern terminus at a boat yard at Messick Point on the Back River, which separates Poquoson from Hampton.

== Major intersections ==
County	Location	mi	km	Destinations	Notes
City of Newport News		0.00	0.00	SR 143 (Jefferson Avenue) to I-64	Western terminus
City of Newport News		0.87	1.40	I-64 – Williamsburg, Richmond, Hampton, Virginia Beach	Exit 256 (I-64)
York	Tabb	2.43	3.91	US 17 (George Washington Memorial Highway) – Yorktown, Newport News	
York	Tabb	2.78	4.47	SR 134 (Hampton Highway) – Hampton, NASA	
City of Poquoson		6.07	9.77	SR 172 (Wythe Creek Road) – Hampton	
City of Poquoson		11.19	18.01	Dead end on Messick Point at Back River	Eastern terminus
1.000 mi = 1.609 km; 1.000 km = 0.621 mi
