= Virginia State Route 134 =

State highway in eastern Virginia, US

State Route 134

Route information
- Maintained by VDOT
- Length: 11.63 mi (18.72 km)
- Existed: early 1940s–present

Major junctions
- South end: US 60 / SR 143 in Hampton
- SR 351 in Hampton; I-64 in Hampton; US 258 in Hampton; SR 152 in Hampton; SR 172 in Hampton; SR 171 in Tabb
- North end: US 17 in Tabb

Location
- Country: United States
- State: Virginia
- Counties: City of Hampton, York

Highway system
- Virginia Routes; Interstate; US; Primary; Secondary; Byways; History; HOT lanes
← SR 133	→ SR 135

State Route 134 (SR 134) is a primary state highway in the U.S. state of Virginia. The state highway runs 11.63 miles (18.72 km) from U.S. Route 60 (US 60) and SR 143 in the independent city of Hampton north to US 17 in Tabb. SR 134 is the main connection between Hampton and southeastern York County and a major artery through Hampton, where the highway runs concurrently with US 258 and Interstate 64 (I-64).

== Route description ==
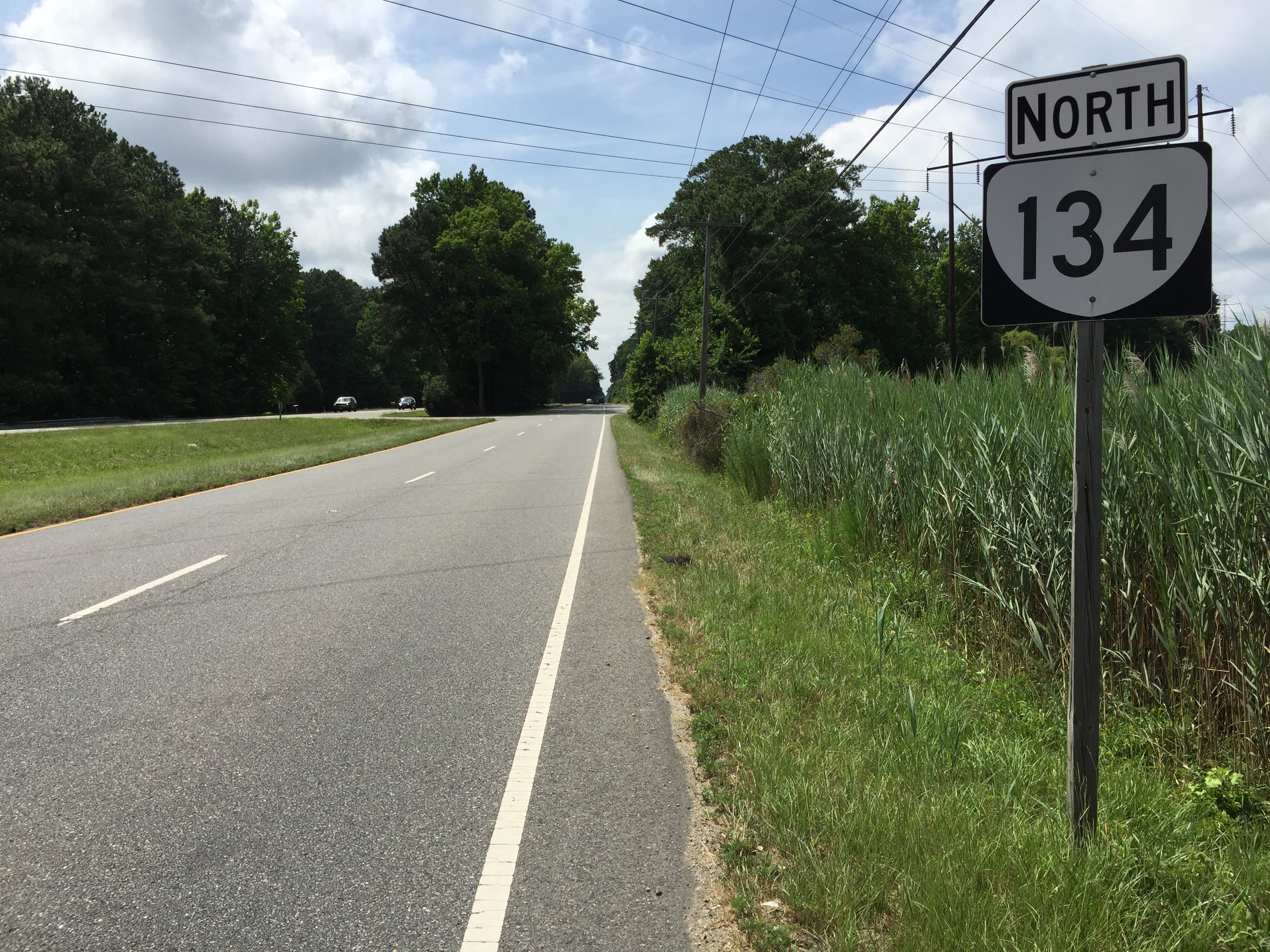
View north along SR 134 entering York County from Hampton

SR 134 begins at an intersection with US 60 and SR 143 (Settlers Landing Road) at the west end of downtown Hampton; Armistead Avenue heads south from the intersection as an unnumbered street. SR 134 heads north as four-lane divided Armistead Avenue, which intersects SR 351 (Pembroke Avenue) and the Phoebus Branch of CSX's Peninsula Subdivision before reaching I-64 (Hampton Roads Beltway). All connections between SR 134 and I-64 are accounted for through intersections with Rip Rap Road, which the highway intersects just north of the railroad crossing; La Salle Avenue, which the highway meets just north of the I-64 overpass; and direct ramps to the north of La Salle Avenue.

North of La Salle Avenue, SR 134 crosses Newmarket Creek and intersects US 258 (Mercury Boulevard). Armistead Avenue continues north as an unnumbered street while the state highway turns west onto eight-lane Mercury Boulevard. SR 134 and US 258 head west through a commercial area where the highways meet the eastern end of SR 152 (Cunningham Drive) and intersect Coliseum Drive, which leads south to the Hampton Coliseum and north to Peninsula Town Center. SR 134 leaves US 258 at the highways' interchange with I-64, a partial cloverleaf interchange with flyover ramps from eastbound I-64 to southbound SR 134 and from eastbound US 258 to westbound I-64. SR 134 runs concurrently with I-64 west to the partial interchange where the state highway exits to the north. That interchange includes a ramp from southbound SR 134 to westbound SR 152, which I-64 crosses while it is concurrent with SR 134.

SR 134 continues north as Neil Armstrong Parkway (formerly Magruder Boulevard), a four-lane divided highway named after American Astronaut Neil Armstrong. North of its single-point urban interchange with Hampton Roads Center Parkway, the state highway continues through a forested area and has a partial cloverleaf interchange with SR 172 (Commander Shepard Highway), which provides access to Langley Research Center and Langley Air Force Base. SR 134 veers northwest and crosses Brick Kiln Creek into York County. The state highway continues as Hampton Highway, which has intersections with SR 600 (Big Bethel Road), SR 171 (Victory Boulevard), and SR 706 (Yorktown Road) before reaching its northern terminus at a trumpet interchange with US 17 (George Washington Memorial Highway) in the community of Tabb.

== Major intersections ==
County	Location	mi	km	Destinations	Notes
City of Hampton		0.00	0.00	US 60 / SR 143 (Settlers Landing Road)	Southern terminus
City of Hampton		0.37	0.60	SR 351 (West Pembroke Avenue)	
City of Hampton		1.16	1.87	I-64 (Hampton Roads Beltway) / LaSalle Avenue – Williamsburg, Richmond, Norfolk, Virginia Beach, Langley AFB	I-64 exit 265; former SR 167
City of Hampton		2.29	3.69	US 258 north (West Mercury Boulevard)	South end of concurrency with US 258
City of Hampton		2.53	4.07	SR 152 south (Cunningham Drive)	
City of Hampton		3.31	5.33	I-64 east / US 258 south (Mercury Boulevard) – James River Bridge, Norfolk, Virginia Beach	North end of concurrency with US 258; south end of concurrency with I-64; SR 134 south follows exit 263
City of Hampton				Todds Lane (SR 152 south)	interchange; southbound exit only
City of Hampton		3.83	6.16	I-64 west – Williamsburg, Richmond	westbound exit and eastbound entrance; north end of I-64 overlap; SR 134 north follows exit 262B
City of Hampton		4.77	7.68	Hampton Roads Center Parkway to I-64 west / Armistead Avenue / Big Bethel Road – Richmond	Single-point urban interchange
City of Hampton		6.23	10.03	SR 172 east (Commander Shepard Boulevard) – NASA Research Center, Langley AFB	Partial cloverleaf interchange
City of Hampton				Commander Shepard Boulevard to SR 172 – Poquoson, Langley Speedway	former SR 134 south
York	Tabb	10.65	17.14	SR 171 (Victory Boulevard) – Poquoson	
York	Tabb	11.63	18.72	US 17 – Newport News, Yorktown, Gloucester	Trumpet interchange; northern terminus
1.000 mi = 1.609 km; 1.000 km = 0.621 mi: Concurrency terminus
