= Virginia State Route 172 =

State highway in Virginia, United States

State Route 172

Route information
- Maintained by VDOT
- Length: 4.85 mi (7.81 km)
- Existed: 1933–present

Major junctions
- South end: SR 134 in Hampton
- SR 171 in Poquoson
- North end: Poquoson Avenue in Poquoson

Location
- Country: United States
- State: Virginia
- Counties: City of Hampton, City of Poquoson

Highway system
- Virginia Routes; Interstate; US; Primary; Secondary; Byways; History; HOT lanes
← SR 171	→ SR 173

State Route 172 (SR 172) is a primary state highway in the U.S. state of Virginia. The state highway runs 4.85 miles (7.81 km) from SR 134 in Hampton north to Poquoson Avenue in Poquoson. SR 172 is the main north–south highway through Poquoson and the primary access road to Langley Air Force Base and NASA's Langley Research Center.

== Route description ==
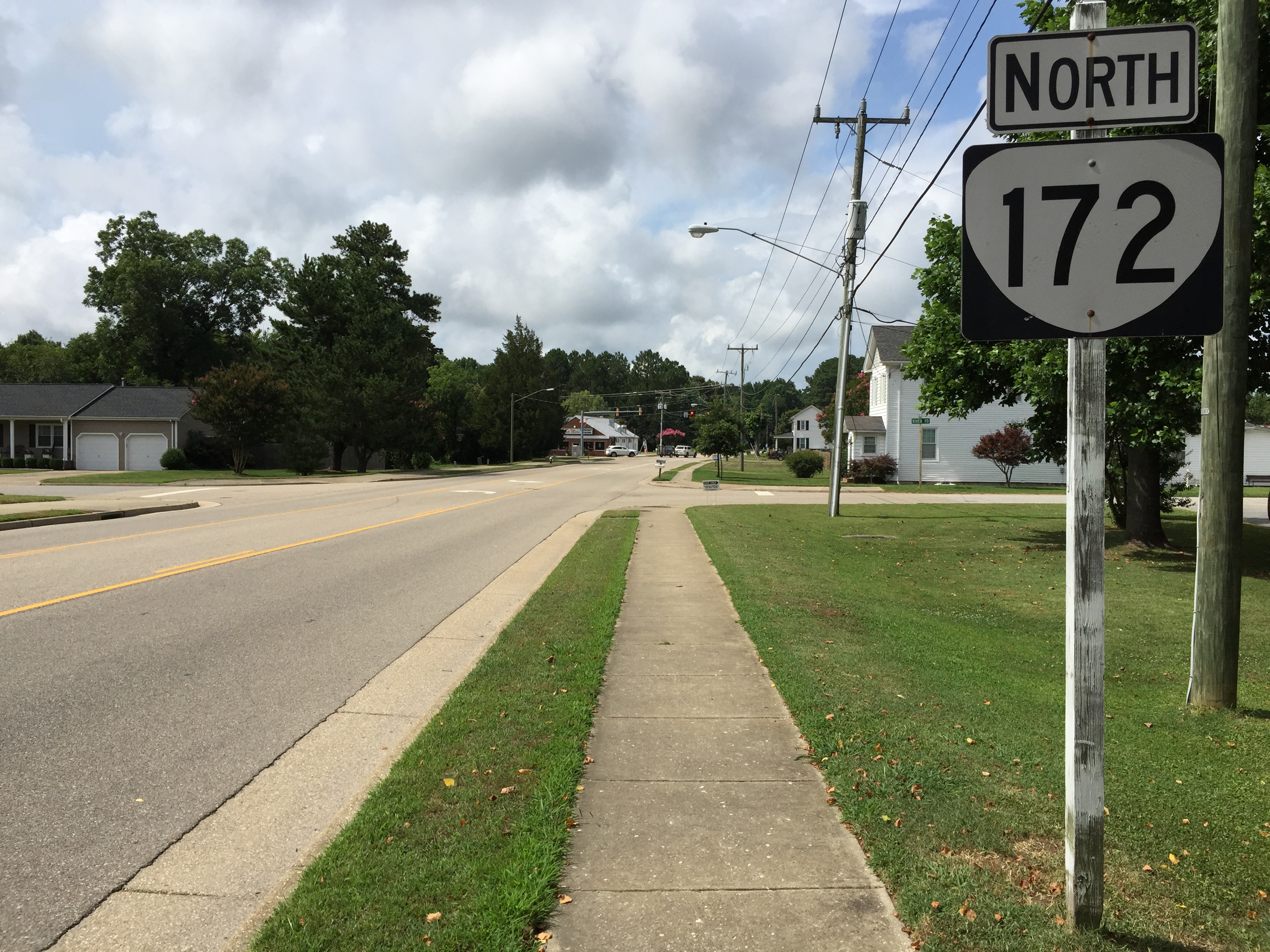
View north along SR 172 in Poquoson

SR 172 begins at an interchange with SR 134 (Neil Armstrong Parkway) in the northern part of the independent city of Hampton. The interchange was changed from a trumpet interchange to a partial cloverleaf interchange to accommodate a westward extension of Commander Shepard Boulevard. SR 172 heads east as a four-lane divided highway on the highway named for Alan Shepard, the first American in space. The state highway meets the northern end of Armistead Avenue, which leads to the main entrance of Langley Air Force Base, as it curves to the north. SR 172 intersects Langley Boulevard, the main entrance to Langley Research Center, then passes between the NASA research center and Langley Speedway. As the boulevard curves back to the west, shortly before reconnecting with SR 134, SR 172 turns north onto Wythe Creek Road.

SR 172 continues as a four-lane undivided highway until north of another gate to the research center, where the highway becomes two lanes. The state highway leaves the research center vicinity by crossing Brick Kiln Creek, a tributary of the Back River, into the city of Poquoson. SR 172 expands to a five-lane road with a center left-turn lane as it approaches the center of Poquoson, where the highway intersects SR 171, which heads west as Victory Boulevard and east as Little Florida Road. The state highway reduces to three lanes just south of its northern terminus at Poquoson Avenue. The road continues north as Yorktown Road, which soon turns west while Hunts Neck Road continues north toward the northern extremity of Poquoson.

== Major intersections ==
County	Location	mi	km	Destinations	Notes
City of Hampton		0.00	0.00	SR 134 (Neil Armstrong Parkway) to I-64	Partial cloverleaf interchange; southern terminus
City of Hampton				Commander Shepard Boulevard to SR 134	
City of Poquoson		3.99	6.42	SR 171 (Victory Boulevard / Little Florida Road) to I-64 – Yorktown	
City of Poquoson		4.85	7.81	Yorktown Road / Poquoson Avenue	Northern terminus; former SR 171 west / SR 172 east
1.000 mi = 1.609 km; 1.000 km = 0.621 mi

< SR 515	District 5 State Routes; 1928–1933	SR 517 >
