= Poquoson River =

Coordinates: 37°10′1″N 76°23′1″W

Location
- Country: United States

Physical characteristics
- Source
  - location: Virginia

The Poquoson River is an 11.7-mile-long (18.8 km), mostly tidal river in the state of Virginia. The river is an estuarine inlet of the Chesapeake Bay, entering just south of the mouth of the York River.

The river flows primarily through York County, rising south of Yorktown to the west of U.S. Route 17 and flowing south to Harwoods Mill Reservoir, a 265-acre impoundment that is the terminal reservoir for the City of Newport News water supply system that was created by damming its upper reaches, where it turns east, flows under Route 17, and becomes tidal. The river flows northeast and becomes the boundary between York County and the city of Poquoson, reaching Chesapeake Bay just north of the Plum Tree Island National Wildlife Refuge. It has several tributaries including Bennett Creek, Roberts Creek, Chisman Creek, Lamb's Creek, Patrick's Creek, Hunter's Creek, and Moore's Creek. The creeks are named for families who settled along their banks during the colonial period.

The river's name is probably related to pocosin. The first reference to Poquoson is believed to be in Colonial records of a land grant of 500 acres (200 ha) in New Poquoson to Christopher Calthorpe in 1631 by a court in what became the former Elizabeth City County. This area still known in the 21st century as Calthrop Neck is bounded by the Poquoson River, Lambs Creek, Moore's Creek and Yorktown Road.

== Civil War ==
The Poquoson River became a strategic location for both sides during the Peninsula Campaign early in the Civil War. A Confederate garrison that became known as "Camp Misery" due to its swampy location was established at Ship Point where Chisman Creek meets the Poquoson River near its mouth. In the spring of 1862, Union General George B. McClellan put together a plan to end the war early by marching up the peninsula from Union held Fort Monroe and taking Richmond. General John Bankhead Magruder and the Army of the Peninsula were charged with attempting to stop McClellan. Magruder's plan was to establish three lines of defense stretched across the Peninsula. The first line extended from Ship Point on the Poquoson River to Young's Mill in Warwick County and was anchored in the center by earthworks in the Howard's Mill area. This line was not intended to completely stop the Union soldiers, but to stall them long enough for other fortifications to be built and additional reinforcements to arrive. The second line of defense extended from Yorktown to Mulberry Island. The third consisted of a series of redoubts in the Williamsburg area. Ship Point was of strategic importance due to its location. Ship Point also had a landing where supplies could be brought in by water from the Chesapeake Bay. The Confederates were also worried about the Union Army going around the first defense line and attacking from the rear or flank so three cannons were positioned where they could fire on any the Union vessels attempting to sail into the mouth of the Poquoson River. The camp was evacuated as the Union forces began their siege of Yorktown and the Confederate forces fell back to the second line of defense.

On April 4, 1863, Colonel William Averill and his 3rd Pennsylvania Cavalry were sent to reconnoiter Ship Point's garrison and defenses. When he returned that evening he reported that the place was abandoned and there were enough barracks for 3000 soldiers. General McClellan had a particular interest in Ship Point. It is apparent from his reports that he was going to attempt to take Ship Point by force had it not already been abandoned by the Confederates. In his April 5 report he mentioned that Ship Point had been turned and was in control of his cavalry. Ship Point was to serve the Union army in three ways. They used it as a supply depot, a point of debarkation, and as a hospital. Ship Point figured highly in the General McClellan's plan to seize Yorktown. Troops traveled by ship from Alexandria to Fort Monroe then on to Ship Point from which they marched to join the Union lines in Yorktown.

The Ship Point hospital has been described as a large log building. The Ship Point hospital was mainly used as a Civil War version of an evacuation hospital. Patients were taken from the battlefield to the hospital and then embarked on ships to Alexandria. War records reveal that many soldiers died while at the Ship Point hospital. Steamers that had been converted to hospital ships were anchored in Chisman's Creek and the Poquoson River. After Yorktown fell Ship Point was no longer needed as a supply depot or embarkation site. The hospital continued operation until late May. The area remained behind Union lines for the remainder of the Civil War.

== See also ==
- List of rivers of Virginia
