= Flos (disambiguation) =

Flos is a genus of butterflies in the family Lycaenidae.

Flos may also refer to:

- Flos (book), a 1225 book by Fibonacci
- Flos Greig (1880–1958), Australian lawyer
- František Flos (1864–1961), Czech novelist
- The FLOS, Former Ladies of the Supremes, music group

== See also ==
- Flo (disambiguation)
- Floss (disambiguation)
