= Poquoson, Virginia =

Independent city in Virginia, United States

- Independent city
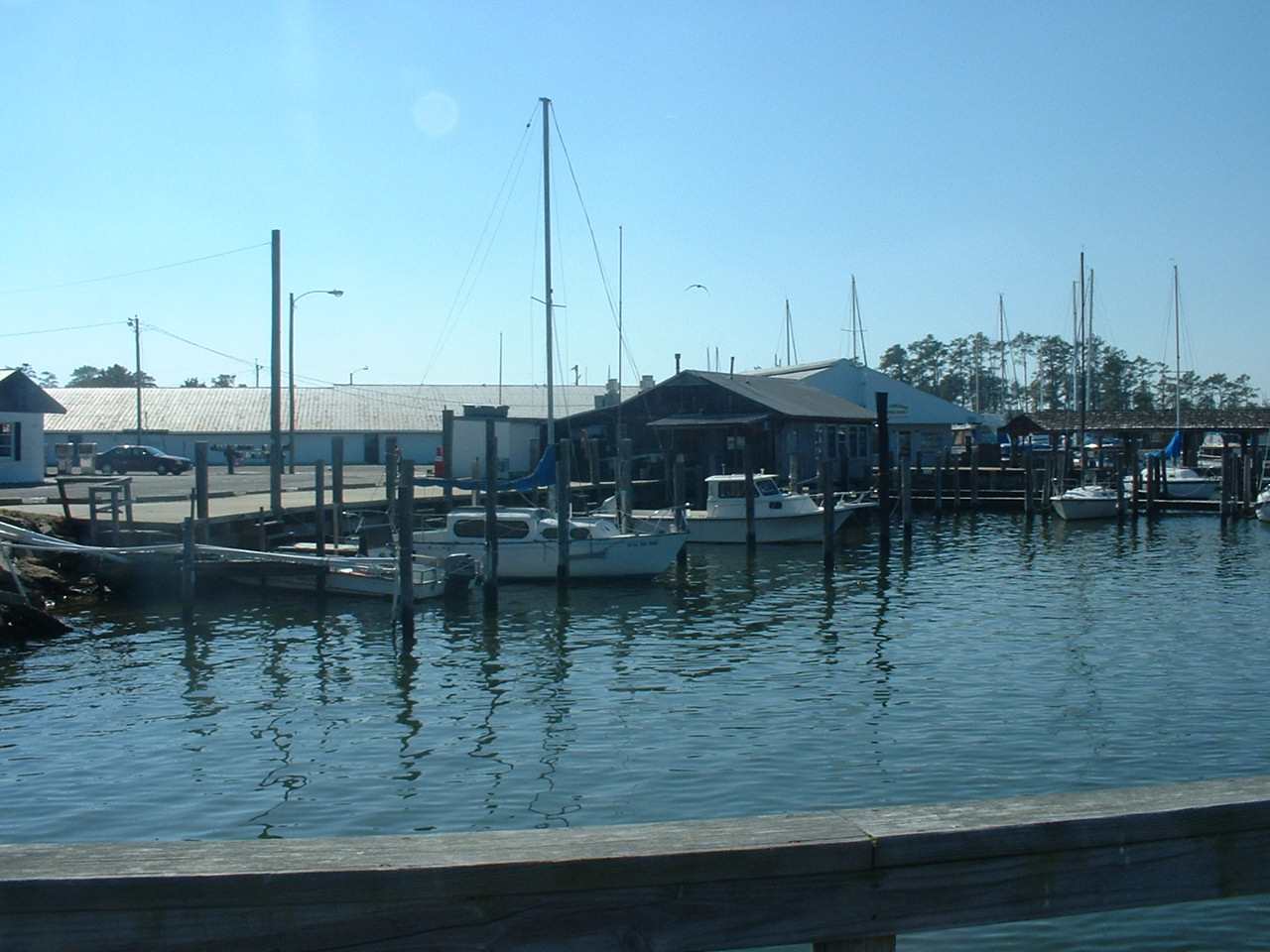
- Boats parked at the Poquoson Marina. Boating has been an important part of Poquoson's economy since its inception.

- Seal
- Nickname: Bull Island
- Interactive map of Poquoson
- Coordinates: 37°7′59″N 76°22′25″W
- Country: United States
- State: Virginia
- County: None (Independent city)
- Founded: 1631

Government
  - Mayor: David A. Hux

Area
  - Independent city: 78.46 sq mi (203.21 km^{2})
  - Land: 15.36 sq mi (39.77 km^{2})
  - Water: 63.10 sq mi (163.43 km^{2})
- Elevation: 10 ft (3.0 m)

Population (2020)
  - Independent city: 12,460
  - Estimate (2025): 13,292 ▲
  - Density: 811.2/sq mi (313.2/km^{2})
  - Metro: 1,799,674
- Time zone: UTC−5 (EST)
  - Summer (DST): UTC−4 (EDT)
- ZIP code: 23662
- Area codes: 757, 948
- FIPS code: 51-63768
- GNIS feature ID: 1479363
- Website: http://www.ci.poquoson.va.us

Poquoson (/pəˈkoʊsən/), informally known as Bull Island, is an independent city in the Commonwealth of Virginia, United States. As of the 2020 census, the population was 12,460. The Bureau of Economic Analysis combines the city of Poquoson with surrounding York County for statistical purposes.

Poquoson is located on the Virginia Peninsula, in the Hampton Roads metropolitan area.

Poquoson, which was formerly part of York County, became an incorporated town in 1952 and an independent city in 1975. (In Virginia, municipalities incorporated as independent cities are not part of any county.) However, the ties remain close. Over 30 years after Poquoson became a politically independent entity, some constitutional services such as the courts, sheriff and jail continue to be shared with neighboring York County.

Poquoson is one of the oldest continuously named cities in Virginia. It is also one of the few to retain a name which derived from the Native Americans who inhabited the area before colonization by the English began in the 17th century.

== History ==
The name of the city is a Native American word which roughly translates to "great marsh." The term pocosin, with its varied spellings, was a term used by the area's inhabitants to describe a low, marshy, woody place covered by water in the winter, but dry in the summer. These Native Americans were Algonquians, a tribal group affiliated through the Powhatan Confederacy, and were defensive to the early colonizers. A petition to have the name of the parish and river changed was an attempt to rid the language of all vestiges of Indian terms. However, "poquoson" has survived through the centuries and has become a proper noun used to designate the present city.

The current city is a remnant of a larger area known from the first days of its settlement in the early 17th century by English colonists as the New Poquoson Parish of the Church of England. In the colonial times before separation of church and state and freedom of religion were established in Virginia and the United States, the church parish boundaries and governmental ones were often the same. In addition to the current city of Poquoson, New Poquoson Parish originally included the areas in York County known today as Poquoson, Tabb, Grafton, Dare and Seaford. This land was opened for settlement in the year 1628 and was occupied by people from the English settlement of the Virginia Colony established at Kecoughtan in 1610 by Sir Thomas Gates which eventually became part of the current City of Hampton. The first reference to Poquoson is believed to be in Colonial records of a land grant of 500 acres (200 ha) in New Poquoson to Christopher Calthorpe in 1631 by a court in what became the former Elizabeth City County. This area located just outside of the Poquoson city limits in York County is still known in the 21st century as Calthrop Neck.

In 1634, the eight original shires of Virginia were created. Poquoson was located in Charles River Shire. The name was changed to York County in 1642–43. The York River was known earlier as the Charles River, and its name was also changed about the same time.

Poquoson grew as a close-knit rural community of York County for the next 300 years. During the American Revolutionary War, independence was won at nearby Yorktown, a major tourist attraction of the Historic Triangle of Colonial Virginia.

One of the first land battles of the American Civil War, the Battle of Big Bethel was fought nearby on June 10, 1861. In the spring of 1862, Union General George B. McClellan put together an ambitious plan known as the Peninsula Campaign to end the war by marching up the peninsula from Union held Fort Monroe and taking the Confederate capitol at Richmond. A copy of his battle plans was obtained by Confederate spy Thomas Nelson Conrad and in response Confederate forces under General John B. Magruder established three lines of defensive positions extending across the peninsula to stop McClellan's march towards Richmond. The first line of defense was anchored on the north by a redoubt on Ship Point near the mouth of the Poquoson River. After the Confederates abandoned the position in 1863 the Union Army established a supply depot and a hospital at Ship Point. Several Poquoson residents fought for the Confederacy during the Civil War including Wesley Messick, who was a crewman on the CSS Virginia during the Battle of Hampton Roads.

Poquoson became an incorporated town in 1952, as the citizens of the community wanted to keep their own high school open instead of having their children bused to York High School due to distance. When the town was incorporated, Poquoson's small predominantly African American community known as Cary's Chapel remained just outside the town limits in York County. The town became an independent city in 1975 in order to maintain this status. The change from incorporated town to independent city status also effectively protected Poquoson from potential annexation suits by the adjacent City of Hampton.

The changes to incorporated town and independent city were part of a wave of municipal changes in southeastern Virginia in the third quarter of the 20th century. Although Poquoson is one of the smaller of 8 independent cities extant in the Hampton Roads region in the 21st century, it is not unique in the area as a city having large areas of undeveloped land and protected wetlands.

Poquoson has long been informally known as "Bull Island" because for centuries farmers in the area let their cattle roam free in the salt marshes. Although only a few small farms remain and the herd of cattle that once grazed in the marshes are long gone, Poquoson residents still call themselves "Bull Islanders".

== Government and law ==
The Poquoson City Council is composed of seven members who are elected by the voters and serve four-year terms. Elections are held in even-numbered years on the first Tuesday in November. Any Poquoson resident who is at least 18 years of age, is a United States citizen and a resident of Virginia is eligible to be a candidate for election. In 2017, Poquoson residents elected a 19-year-old to the City Council.

The city is divided into three precincts with each precinct having two council representatives. Voters cast their ballots for one candidate from each precinct. One representative is elected at large and serves as City Mayor. Persons elected to City Council take office on the first day of January following the election.

The City Council is the policy making body of the city. Its responsibilities include adoption of the City budget; approval of all tax levies; adoption of ordinances; approval of amendments, supplements or repeals to ordinances and the City Code; and appointment of the City Manager, City Clerk, City Attorney, and various local boards, commissions and committees. The city's school board is appointed by the City Council.

Over 30 years after Poquoson became an independent city from York County, some constitutional services such as the courts, sheriff and jail continue to be shared with neighboring York County.

== Politics ==
Historically, Poquoson voters have trended strongly towards conservative candidates at the national, state, and local levels and since the decline of the Byrd Organization. Poquoson is part of Virginia's 1st congressional district, represented by Republican Rob Wittman. Poquoson is one of six counties or county equivalents that have voted Republican for president in every election since they came into existence. (Note: Along with Leslie County, Kentucky (since 1880); Doniphan County, Kansas (since 1864); Colonial Heights, Virginia (since 1952); Chugach Census Area, Alaska (since 2020); and Copper River Census Area, Alaska (since 2020).)

At the state level, Poquoson is represented by J.D. Diggs, a Republican, as part of the 24th District of the Virginia Senate and Virgil Thornton Sr., a Democrat, as part of the 86th District of the Virginia House of Delegates. The mayor and city council members are elected in nonpartisan elections; the current mayor is David A. Hux, a self-described conservative.

United States presidential election results for Poquoson, Virginia
Year	Republican		Democratic		Third party(ies)	
Year	No.	%	No.	%	No.	%
1976	1,461	55.34%	1,140	43.18%	39	1.48%
1980	2,338	68.78%	877	25.80%	184	5.41%
1984	3,667	84.73%	647	14.95%	14	0.32%
1988	3,840	80.83%	877	18.46%	34	0.72%
1992	3,354	61.69%	1,086	19.97%	997	18.34%
1996	3,422	64.86%	1,409	26.71%	445	8.43%
2000	4,271	72.87%	1,448	24.71%	142	2.42%
2004	5,004	77.34%	1,424	22.01%	42	0.65%
2008	5,229	74.01%	1,748	24.74%	88	1.25%
2012	5,312	74.75%	1,679	23.63%	115	1.62%
2016	5,092	70.95%	1,601	22.31%	484	6.74%
2020	5,605	71.34%	2,054	26.14%	198	2.52%
2024	5,800	71.92%	2,119	26.27%	146	1.81%

== Media ==
Poquoson's daily newspaper is the Daily Press. Other papers include the New Journal and Guide, The Virginian-Pilot, and Inside Business.

Poquoson has a weekly paper, The Yorktown Crier / The Poquoson Post. The Hampton Roads Magazine serves as a bi-monthly regional magazine for Poquoson and the Hampton Roads area. Hampton Roads Times serves as an online magazine for all the Hampton Roads cities and counties.

Poquoson is served by a variety of radio stations on the AM and FM dials, with towers located around the Hampton Roads area.

Poquoson is also served by several television stations. The Norfolk-Portsmouth-Newport News designated market area (DMA), of which Poquoson is included, is the 44th largest in the U.S. with 709,730 homes (0.62% of the total U.S.). The major network television affiliates are WTKR-TV 3 (CBS), WAVY 10 (NBC), WVEC-TV 13 (ABC), WGNT 27 (CW), WTVZ 33 (MyNetworkTV), WVBT 43 (Fox), and WPXV 49 (ION Television). The Public Broadcasting Service station is WHRO-TV 15. Newport News residents also can receive independent stations, such as WSKY broadcasting on channel 4 from the Outer Banks of North Carolina and WGBS-LD broadcasting on channel 11 from Hampton. Poquoson is served by Cox Cable which provides LNC 5, a local 24-hour cable news television network. DirecTV, Verizon FiOS and Dish Network are also popular as an alternative to cable television in Poquoson.

== Geography ==
Poquoson is located at 37°7′59″N 76°22′25″W (37.133153, -76.373881).

According to the United States Census Bureau, the city has a total area of 78.49 square miles (203.3 km^{2}), of which 15.38 square miles (39.8 km^{2}) is land and 63.11 square miles (163.5 km^{2}) (80.4%) is water.

The city is a peninsula containing twenty square miles and is located between the Poquoson River on the north, Back River and Wythe Creek (the Old Poquoson River) on the south, the Chesapeake Bay on the east, and York County on the west. The city also shares a border with the City of Hampton and a water boundary across Chesapeake Bay with Northampton County.

=== Climate ===
Poquoson's mild four season climate means outdoor activities can be enjoyed year round. The weather in Poquoson is temperate and seasonal. Summers are hot and humid with cool evenings. The mean annual temperature is 60 °F (16 °C), with an average annual snowfall of 6 inches (15 cm) and an average annual rainfall of 47 inches (1,200 mm). No measurable snow fell in 1999. The wettest seasons are the spring and summer, although rainfall is fairly constant all year round. The highest recorded temperature was 105 °F (41 °C) in 1980. The lowest recorded temperature was −3 °F (−19 °C) on January 21, 1985.

Additionally, the geographic location of the city, with respect to the principal storm tracks, is generally favorable, as it is south of the usual path of storms originating in the higher latitudes, and north of the usual tracks of hurricanes and other major tropical storms. However, when in the path of a storm the City of Poquoson is subject to severe flooding due to its very low elevation above sea level. Poquoson was significantly impacted by the most destructive storm of 2003, Hurricane Isabel, which caused the worst flooding the Hampton Roads area had seen since the 1933 Chesapeake–Potomac hurricane 70 years earlier. During Hurricane Isabel, most of the city was under several feet of water due to the storm surge. Six years later the November 2009 Mid-Atlantic nor'easter again flooded much of the city. A mandatory evacuation order was issued during Hurricane Irene in 2011 which also caused significant flooding in Poquoson. As a result of these floods, many homes in Poquoson have been elevated on raised foundations.

Climate data for Norfolk International Airport, Virginia (1991–2020 normals, (Note: Mean monthly maxima and minima (i.e. the expected highest and lowest temperature readings at any point during the year or given month) calculated based on data at said location from 1991 to 2020.) extremes 1874–present (Note: Official records for Norfolk kept January 1874 to December 1945 at the Weather Bureau Office in downtown, and at Norfolk Int'l since January 1946. For more information, see Threadex.))
Month	Jan	Feb	Mar	Apr	May	Jun	Jul	Aug	Sep	Oct	Nov	Dec	Year
Record high °F (°C)	84 (29)	82 (28)	92 (33)	97 (36)	100 (38)	102 (39)	105 (41)	105 (41)	100 (38)	95 (35)	86 (30)	82 (28)	105 (41)
Mean maximum °F (°C)	72.4 (22.4)	74.3 (23.5)	80.7 (27.1)	86.9 (30.5)	91.5 (33.1)	95.7 (35.4)	98.4 (36.9)	95.3 (35.2)	92.0 (33.3)	86.0 (30.0)	78.9 (26.1)	73.4 (23.0)	99.3 (37.4)
Mean daily maximum °F (°C)	50.7 (10.4)	53.4 (11.9)	60.1 (15.6)	70.0 (21.1)	77.4 (25.2)	85.2 (29.6)	89.4 (31.9)	86.9 (30.5)	81.4 (27.4)	72.3 (22.4)	62.1 (16.7)	54.7 (12.6)	70.3 (21.3)
Daily mean °F (°C)	42.2 (5.7)	44.2 (6.8)	50.7 (10.4)	60.1 (15.6)	68.3 (20.2)	76.7 (24.8)	81.1 (27.3)	79.2 (26.2)	74.0 (23.3)	63.7 (17.6)	53.3 (11.8)	46.1 (7.8)	61.6 (16.4)
Mean daily minimum °F (°C)	33.6 (0.9)	35.1 (1.7)	41.3 (5.2)	50.1 (10.1)	59.1 (15.1)	68.1 (20.1)	72.8 (22.7)	71.6 (22.0)	66.6 (19.2)	55.1 (12.8)	44.4 (6.9)	37.6 (3.1)	52.9 (11.6)
Mean minimum °F (°C)	18.7 (−7.4)	21.6 (−5.8)	27.4 (−2.6)	37.0 (2.8)	46.9 (8.3)	56.0 (13.3)	64.7 (18.2)	63.7 (17.6)	55.5 (13.1)	40.4 (4.7)	29.8 (−1.2)	23.9 (−4.5)	16.8 (−8.4)
Record low °F (°C)	−3 (−19)	2 (−17)	14 (−10)	23 (−5)	36 (2)	45 (7)	54 (12)	49 (9)	40 (4)	27 (−3)	17 (−8)	5 (−15)	−3 (−19)
Average precipitation inches (mm)	3.41 (87)	2.90 (74)	3.69 (94)	3.37 (86)	3.78 (96)	4.43 (113)	6.08 (154)	5.88 (149)	5.40 (137)	3.86 (98)	3.10 (79)	3.28 (83)	49.18 (1,249)
Average snowfall inches (cm)	3.2 (8.1)	1.5 (3.8)	0.4 (1.0)	0.0 (0.0)	0.0 (0.0)	0.0 (0.0)	0.0 (0.0)	0.0 (0.0)	0.0 (0.0)	0.0 (0.0)	0.0 (0.0)	1.1 (2.8)	6.2 (16)
Average precipitation days (≥ 0.01 in)	10.7	9.2	10.9	10.0	11.2	9.7	10.6	10.2	9.4	7.7	8.9	9.9	118.4
Average snowy days (≥ 0.1 in)	1.7	1.3	0.5	0.0	0.0	0.0	0.0	0.0	0.0	0.0	0.0	0.5	4.0
Average relative humidity (%)	66.3	65.6	64.6	62.8	68.8	70.6	73.3	75.2	74.4	72.1	68.5	67.0	69.1
Average dew point °F (°C)	27.9 (−2.3)	28.9 (−1.7)	35.8 (2.1)	43.2 (6.2)	54.5 (12.5)	63.1 (17.3)	68.2 (20.1)	68.0 (20.0)	62.4 (16.9)	51.3 (10.7)	41.7 (5.4)	32.7 (0.4)	48.1 (9.0)
Mean monthly sunshine hours	171.5	175.2	229.3	252.8	271.7	280.1	278.3	260.4	231.4	208.3	175.7	160.4	2,695.1
Percentage possible sunshine	56	58	62	64	62	64	62	62	62	60	57	53	61
Average ultraviolet index	2	4	5	7	8	10	9	9	7	5	3	2	6
Source 1: NOAA (relative humidity and sun 1961–1990)
Source 2: Weather Atlas (UV)

Climate data for Poquoson, Virginia (1980–2010)
Month	Jan	Feb	Mar	Apr	May	Jun	Jul	Aug	Sep	Oct	Nov	Dec	Year
Mean daily maximum °F (°C)	47.7 (8.7)	51.1 (10.6)	59.0 (15.0)	68.8 (20.4)	76.5 (24.7)	84.6 (29.2)	88.6 (31.4)	86.3 (30.2)	80.7 (27.1)	70.8 (21.6)	61.2 (16.2)	51.5 (10.8)	68.9 (20.5)
Mean daily minimum °F (°C)	28.9 (−1.7)	31.1 (−0.5)	37.0 (2.8)	45.8 (7.7)	55.0 (12.8)	64.5 (18.1)	69.1 (20.6)	67.5 (19.7)	61.1 (16.2)	49.8 (9.9)	41.0 (5.0)	32.5 (0.3)	48.6 (9.2)
Average precipitation inches (mm)	3.6 (91)	3.4 (86)	4.4 (110)	3.3 (84)	3.9 (99)	3.5 (89)	4.6 (120)	4.7 (120)	4.2 (110)	3.4 (86)	3.3 (84)	3.4 (86)	45.7 (1,165)
Source: USA.com

=== National protected area ===
- Plum Tree Island National Wildlife Refuge

== Infrastructure ==
Poquoson is served by two airports. Newport News/Williamsburg International Airport, located in Newport News, and Norfolk International Airport, in Norfolk, both cater to passengers from Hampton Roads. The primary airport for the Virginia Peninsula is the Newport News/Williamsburg International Airport.

Norfolk International Airport (IATA: ORF, ICAO: KORF, FAA LID: ORF), serves the region. The airport is located near Chesapeake Bay, along the city limits of Norfolk and Virginia Beach. Seven airlines provide nonstop services to twenty five destinations. ORF had 3,703,664 passengers take off or land at its facility and 68,778,934 pounds of cargo were processed through its facilities. The Williamsburg-Jamestown Airport provides general aviation services and is located in Williamsburg.

Amtrak serves nearby Newport News, Virginia and Williamsburg, Virginia with three trains a day. The line runs west along the Virginia Peninsula to Richmond and points beyond. Connecting buses are available to Norfolk and Virginia Beach. A high-speed rail connection at Richmond to both the Northeast Corridor and the Southeast High Speed Rail Corridor are also under study. Poquoson is served by two state highways:

- Route 171, also known as Victory Boulevard entering Poquoson from York County before becoming Little Florida Road, then Poquoson Avenue, and finally Messick Road.
- Route 172, also known as Wythe Creek Road entering Poquoson from Hampton before terminating at Yorktown Road and Hunt's Neck Road.

The Newport News Waterworks was begun as a project of Collis P. Huntington as part of the development of the lower peninsula with the Chesapeake and Ohio Railway, the coal piers on the harbor of Hampton Roads, and massive shipyard which were the major sources of industrial growth which helped found Newport News as a new independent city in 1896. It includes reservoirs at Skiffe's Creek and another near Walker's Dam on the Chickahominy River. A regional water provider, in modern times it is owned and operated by the City of Newport News, and serves over 400,000 people in the cities of Hampton, Newport News, Poquoson, and portions of York County and James City County.

The City provides wastewater services for residents and transports wastewater to the regional Hampton Roads Sanitation District treatment plants.

Poquoson has access to four area hospitals, served by Riverside Medical Center and Bon Secours Mary Immaculate Hospital in Newport News and the Sentara Careplex and the V.A. Medical Center in Hampton.

== Demographics ==
Historical population
Census	Pop.	Note	%±
1960	4,278		—
1970	5,441		27.2%
1980	8,726		60.4%
1990	11,005		26.1%
2000	11,566		5.1%
2010	12,150		5.0%
2020	12,460		2.6%
2025 (est.)	13,292	▲	6.7%
U.S. Decennial Census; 1790-1960 1900-1990; 1990-2000 2010-2020

=== Racial and ethnic composition ===
Poquoson city, Virginia – Racial and ethnic composition Note: the US Census treats Hispanic/Latino as an ethnic category. This table excludes Latinos from the racial categories and assigns them to a separate category. Hispanics/Latinos may be of any race.
Race / Ethnicity (NH = Non-Hispanic)	Pop 1980	Pop 1990	Pop 2000	Pop 2010	Pop 2020	% 1980	% 1990	% 2000	% 2010	% 2020
White alone (NH)	8,580	10,643	11,048	11,398	10,937	98.33%	96.71%	95.52%	93.81%	87.78%
Black or African American alone (NH)	25	82	78	78	107	0.29%	0.75%	0.67%	0.64%	0.86%
Native American or Alaska Native alone (NH)	8	24	26	34	33	0.09%	0.22%	0.22%	0.28%	0.26%
Asian alone (NH)	53	159	182	259	253	0.61%	1.44%	1.57%	2.13%	2.03%
Native Hawaiian or Pacific Islander alone (NH)	x	x	4	3	2	x	x	0.03%	0.02%	0.02%
Other race alone (NH)	14	1	5	6	67	0.16%	0.01%	0.04%	0.05%	0.54%
Mixed race or Multiracial (NH)	x	x	101	151	598	x	x	0.87%	1.24%	4.80%
Hispanic or Latino (any race)	46	96	122	221	463	0.53%	0.87%	1.05%	1.82%	3.72%
Total	8,726	11,005	11,566	12,150	12,460	100.00%	100.00%	100.00%	100.00%	100.00%

=== 2020 census ===
As of the 2020 census, Poquoson had a population of 12,460 and a median age of 43.3 years. 23.0% of residents were under the age of 18 and 20.1% of residents were 65 years of age or older. For every 100 females there were 97.5 males, and for every 100 females age 18 and over there were 95.5 males age 18 and over.

91.1% of residents lived in urban areas, while 8.9% lived in rural areas.

There were 4,647 households in Poquoson, of which 34.5% had children under the age of 18 living in them. Of all households, 62.1% were married-couple households, 13.4% were households with a male householder and no spouse or partner present, and 19.7% were households with a female householder and no spouse or partner present. About 19.4% of all households were made up of individuals and 10.2% had someone living alone who was 65 years of age or older.

There were 4,926 housing units, of which 5.7% were vacant. The homeowner vacancy rate was 2.3% and the rental vacancy rate was 5.5%.

Racial composition as of the 2020 census
Race	Number	Percent
White	11,059	88.8%
Black or African American	120	1.0%
American Indian and Alaska Native	41	0.3%
Asian	264	2.1%
Native Hawaiian and Other Pacific Islander	7	0.1%
Some other race	133	1.1%
Two or more races	836	6.7%
Hispanic or Latino (of any race)	463	3.7%

=== 2010 census ===
Age distribution for Poquoson.

As of the census of 2010, there were 12,150 people, 4,166 households, and 3,370 families residing in the city. The population density was 745.4 people per square mile (287.8 people/km^{2}). There were 4,300 housing units at an average density of 277.1 per square mile (107.0/km^{2}). The racial makeup of the city was 95.1% White, 0.6% African American, 0.3% Native American, 2.1% Asian, 0.0% Pacific Islander, 0.3% from other races, and 1.4% from two or more races. Hispanic or Latino of any race were 1.8% of the population.

There were 4,166 households, out of which 39.1% had children under the age of 18 living with them, 69.4% were married couples living together, 8.4% had a female householder with no husband present, and 19.1% were non-families. 15.9% of all households were made up of individuals, and 7.1% had someone living alone who was 65 years of age or older. The average household size was 2.75 and the average family size was 3.08.

In the city, the population was spread out, with 26.8% under the age of 18, 6.4% from 18 to 24, 26.7% from 25 to 44, 28.7% from 45 to 64, and 11.4% who were 65 years of age or older. The median age was 40 years. For every 100 females, there were 100.2 males. For every 100 females age 18 and over, there were 94.4 males.

The median income for a household in the city was $86,611, and the median income for a family was $96,419. Males had a median income of $71,025 versus $43,864 for females. The per capita income for the city was $37,988. About 2.9% of families and 4.3% of the population were below the poverty line, including 6.5% of those under age 18 and 6.5% of those age 65 or over.

== Culture ==
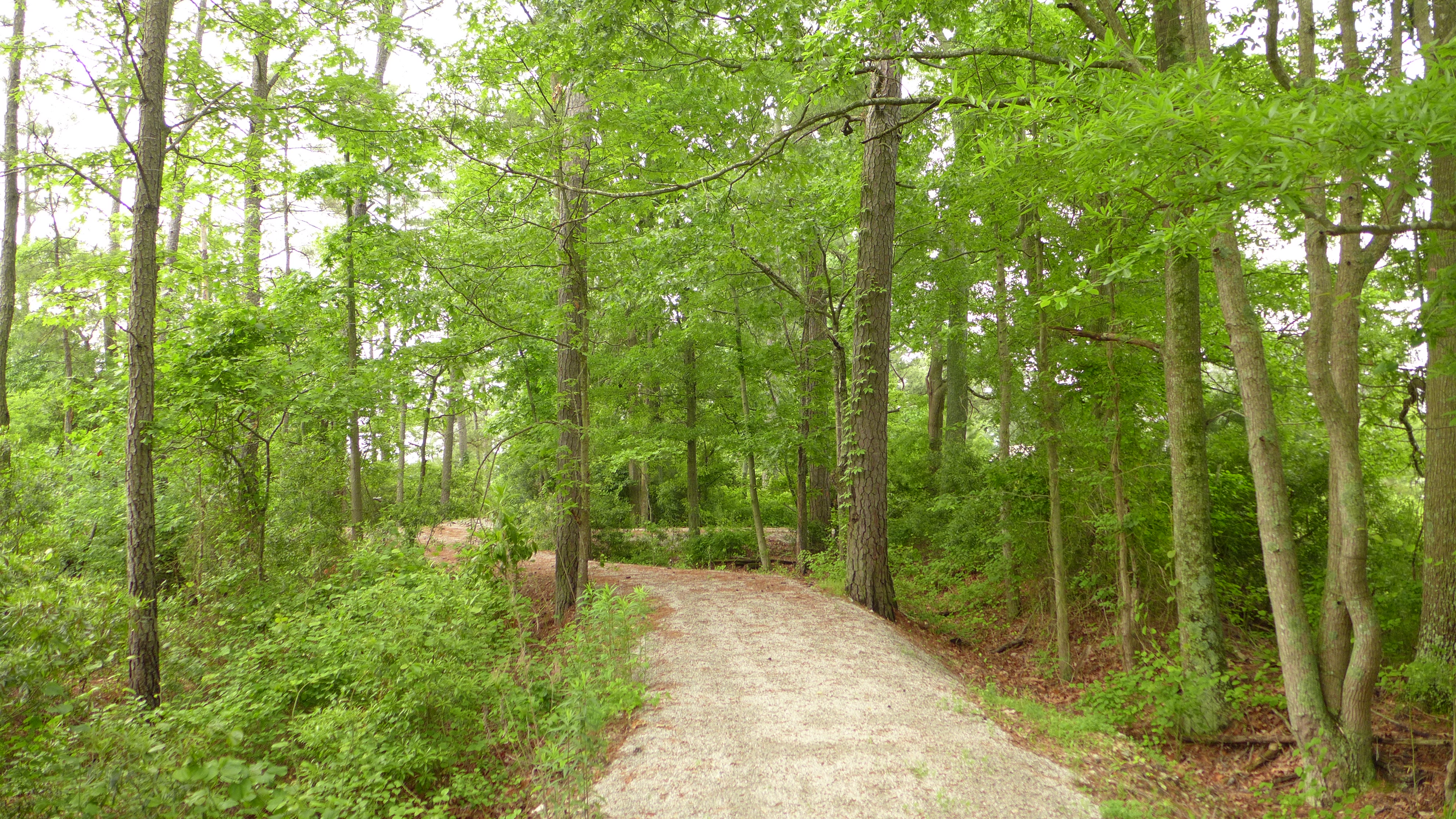
View from the Poquoson Museum's marsh path.

Prior to World War II and Cold War-era expansions of nearby military bases and defense industries, and white flight from the nearby cities of Hampton and Newport News following the racial integration of schools that rapidly turned the area into a bedroom community, Poquoson was a sleepy rural area with many small family farms, commercial wharves, seafood packing houses, and boat yards that built and repaired log canoes, oyster buy-boats, and Chesapeake Bay deadrise work boats used by the local waterman. The annual Poquoson Seafood Festival which celebrates Poquoson's heritage is the biggest event in Poquoson. Events at the Friday - Sunday festival include work boat races, singers/bands, vendors, food, crafts, children's entertainment, carnival rides, and sometimes even fireworks.

The Poquoson Museum, founded in 2003, is located on a 16-acre parcel that contains a circa 1900 farm house, agricultural out buildings, frontage along the marshes of Topping Creek and a country store known as ‘Miss Becky’s Store’ that served local residents for many years. In April 2013 the museum completed work on a marsh walk that incorporates 750 feet of raised platforms with signs highlighting different native wildlife and plant life.

== Education ==
The city is served by Poquoson City Public Schools. There are 4 public schools in Poquoson. There is the Poquoson Primary School for Kindergarten, and 1st and 2nd grades. Poquoson Elementary School serves the 3rd, 4th, and 5th grades. Poquoson Middle School offers 6th, 7th, and 8th grade classes. Poquoson High School has grades 9–12. Poquoson's mascot is the Bull Islander in reference to city folklore, which is often shortened to "bull" or "islander" for simplicity.

There are no private schools or colleges in Poquoson and York County. However, there are institutions of each type close by on the Virginia Peninsula. Some of the private schools include Hampton Roads Academy, Our Lady of Mt. Carmel Catholic School, Peninsula Catholic High School, and Denbigh Baptist Christian School, all in Newport News.

== Sister cities and schools ==
Poquoson's sister city is:

- Le Bar-sur-Loup, Alpes-Maritimes, France.

Poquoson has two current partner schools.

- Balboa Academy, Panama
- Uruguayan American School, Uruguay

== Notable people ==
- Baiju Bhatt, founder and co-founder of companies in different fields of activity
- Kyle Crockett, Cleveland Indians baseball player
- Kitty Joyner, NASA's first female engineer
- Chad Pinder, Oakland Athletics baseball player

== Gallery ==
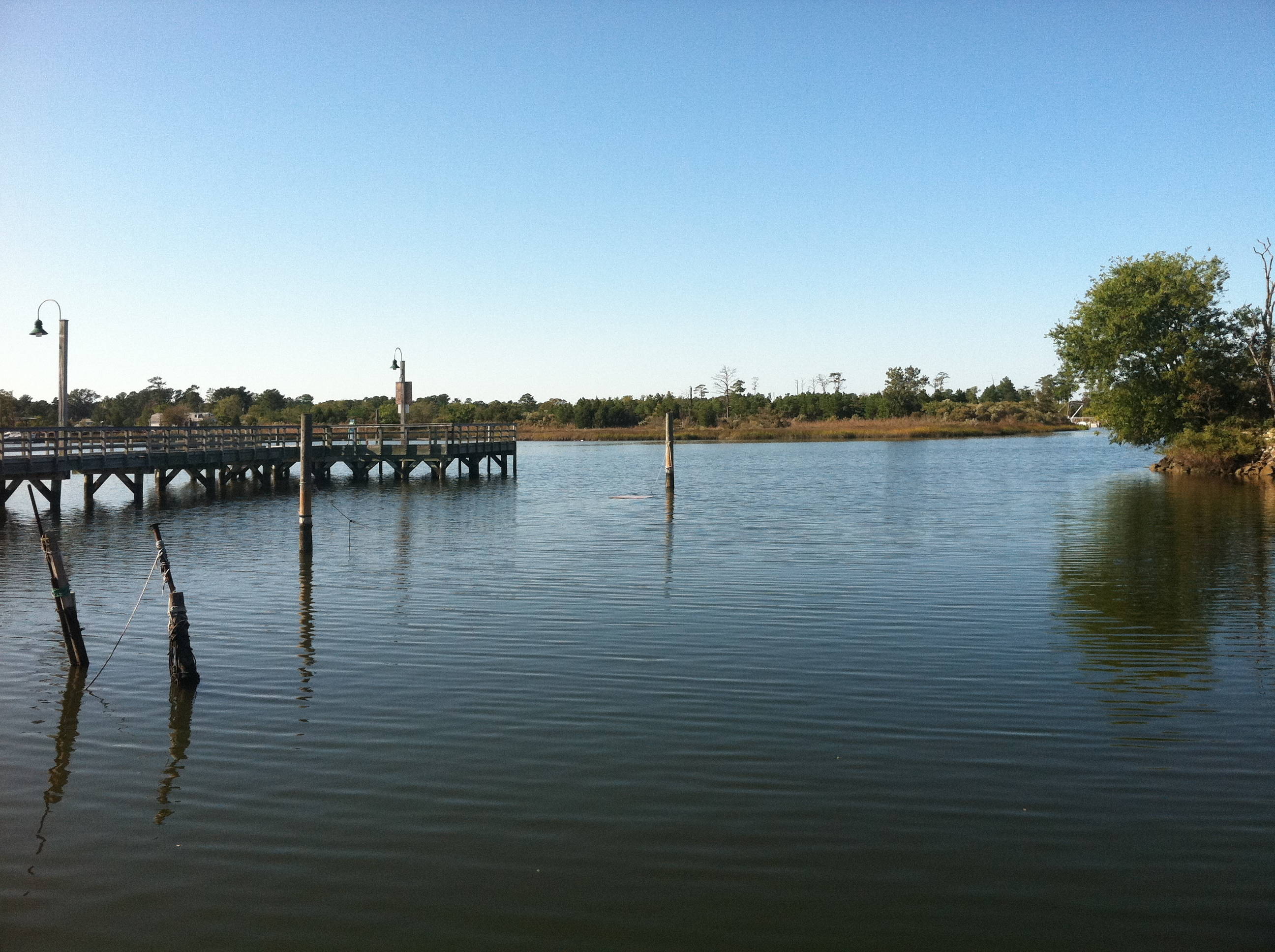
View from the old Whitehouse Cove public boat ramp

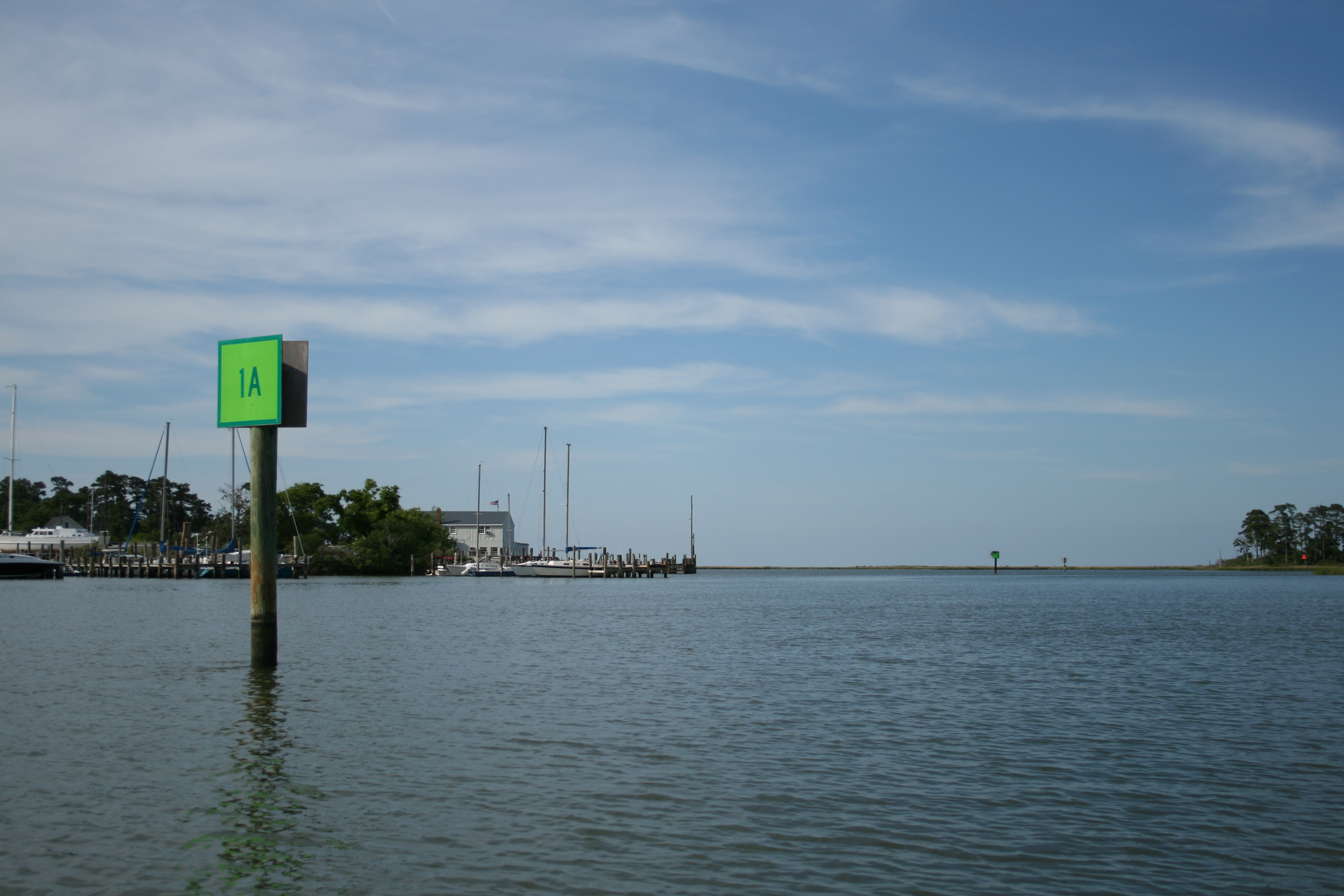
Poquoson Marina near Owen's Marina and Whitehouse Cove leading out towards the Chesapeake Bay

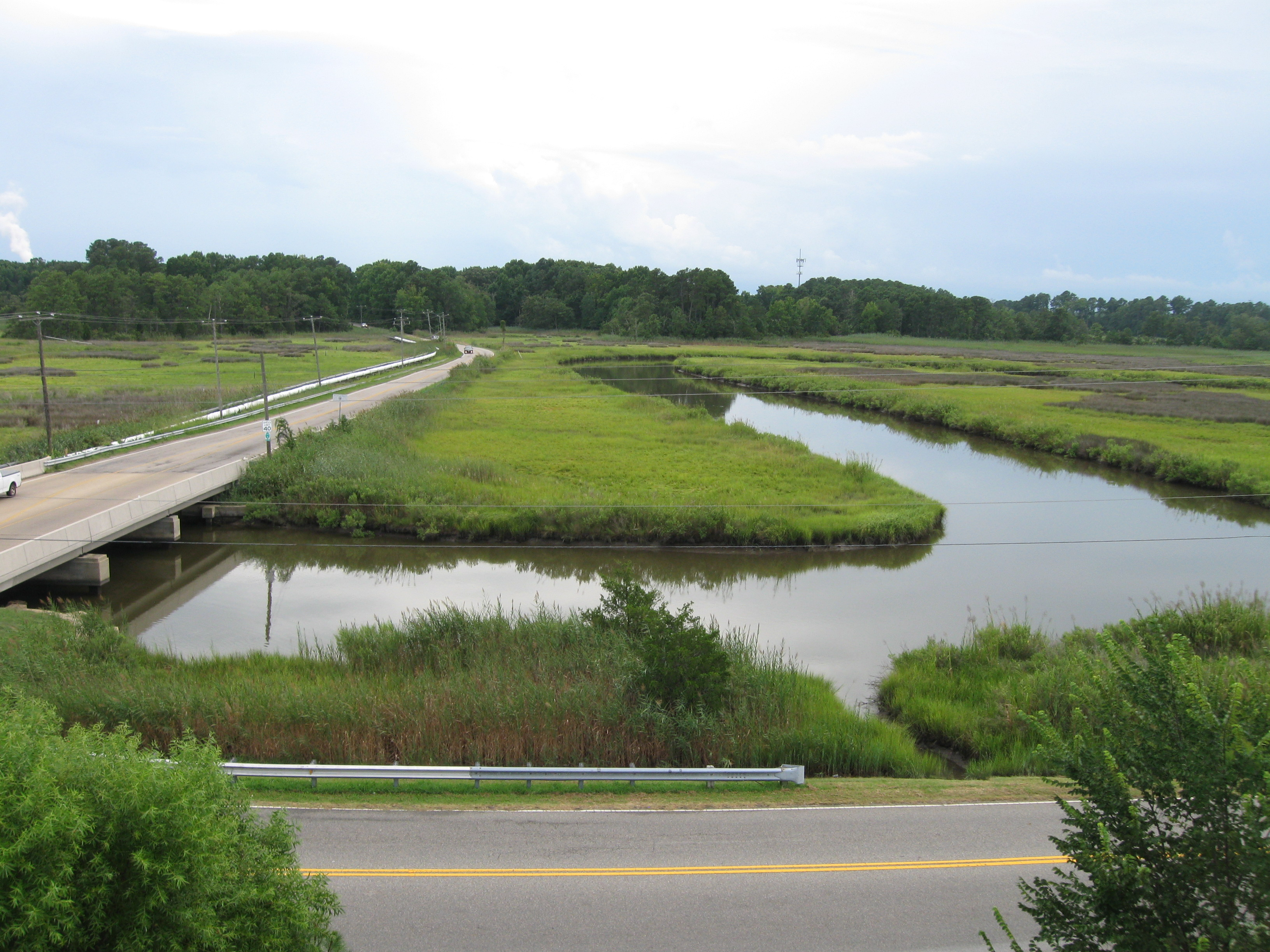
Wythe Creek Road approaching the city from Hampton across Brick Kiln Creek

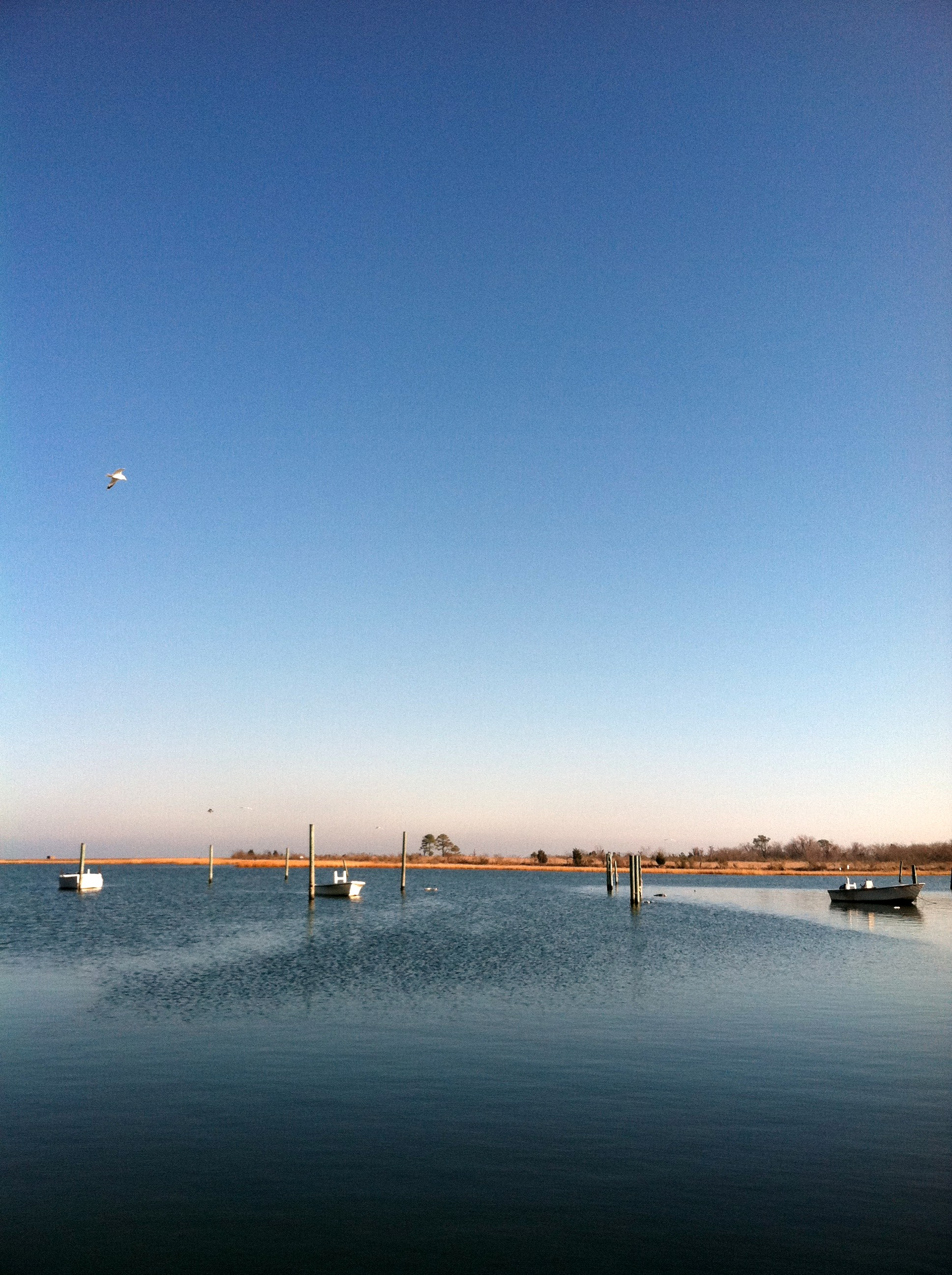
Boats docked during the winter at Messick Point

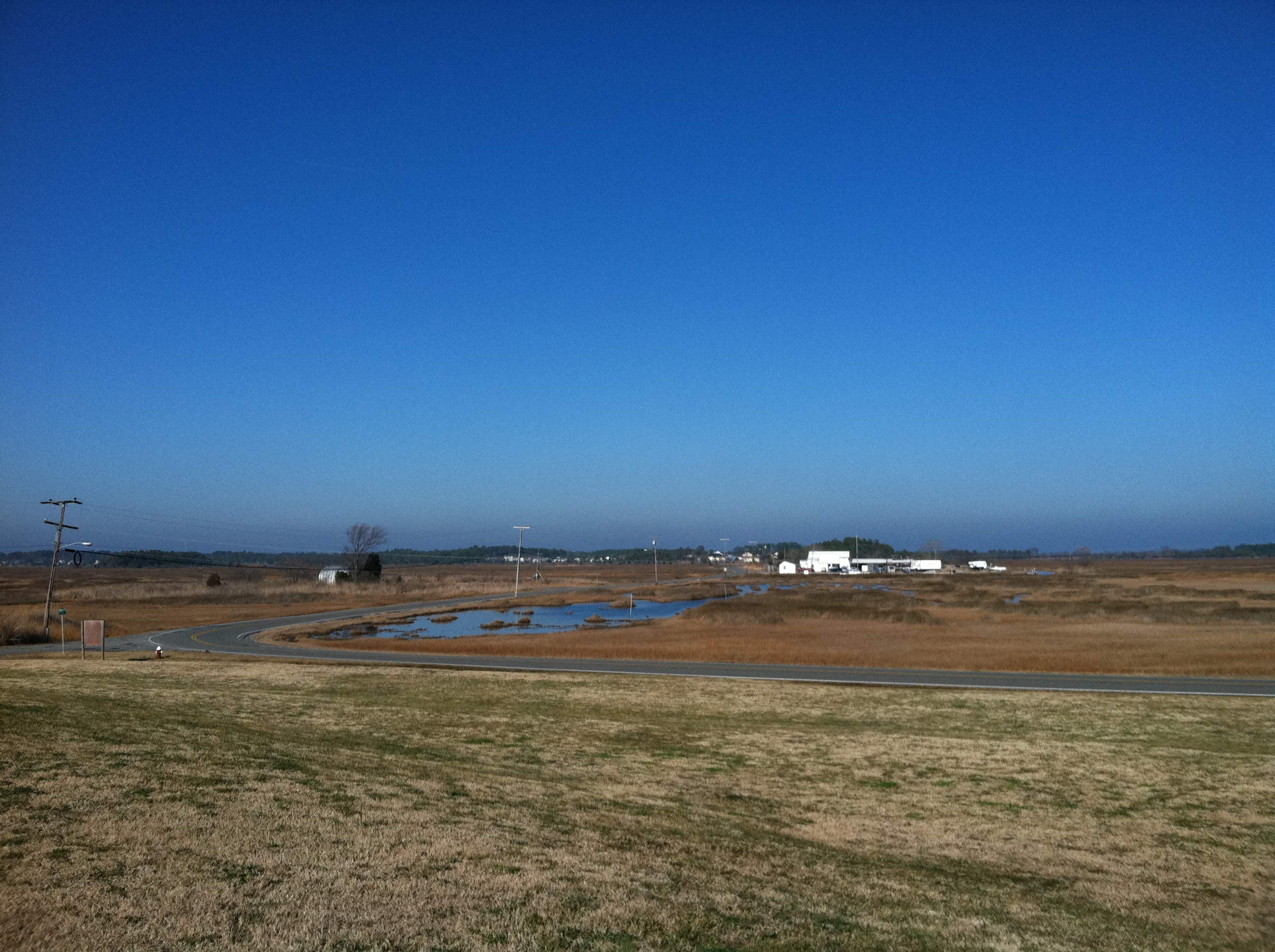
Looking towards the city from Messick Point

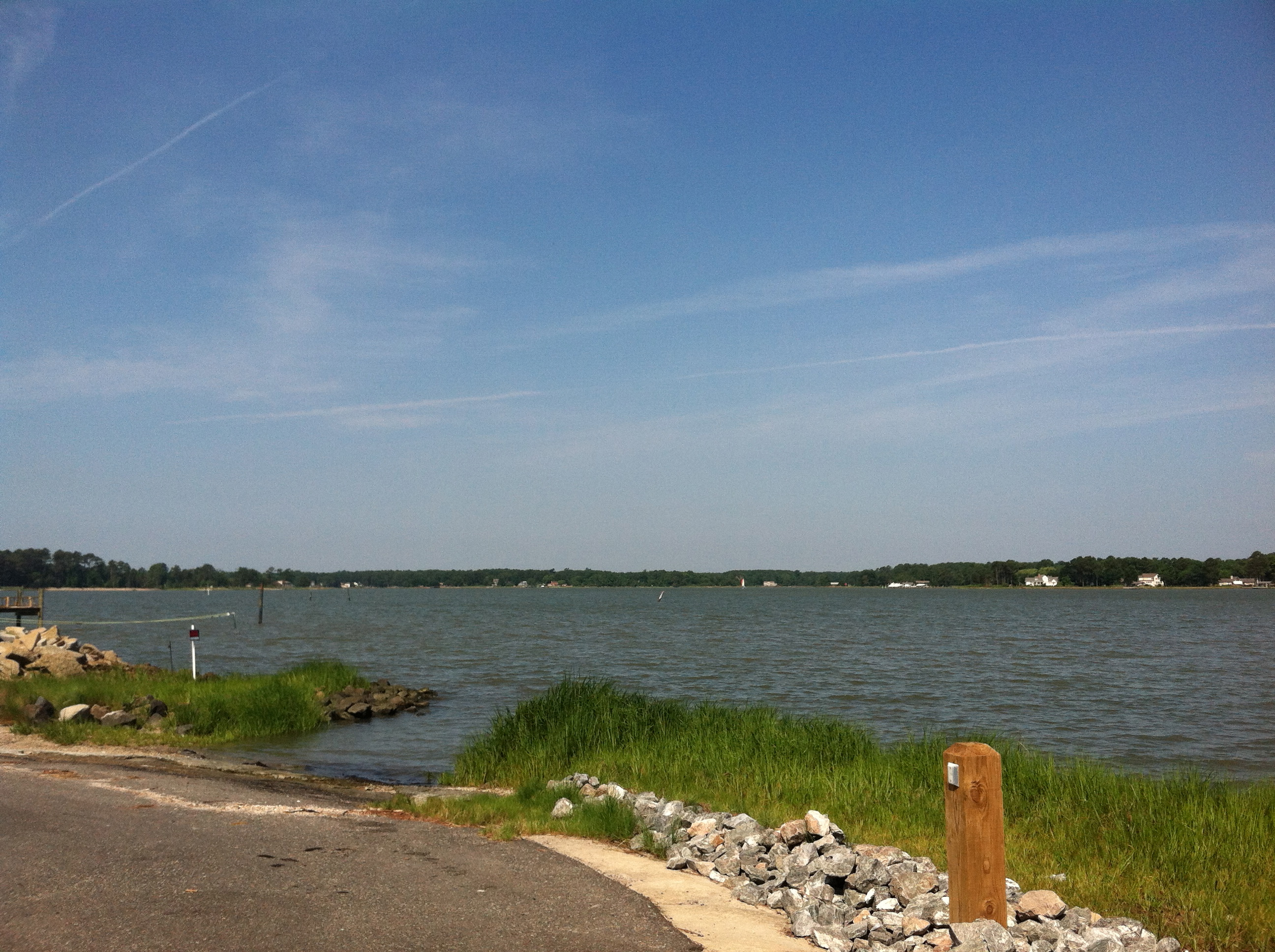
View of the Poquoson River facing towards York County from the end of Hunts Neck Road
