= Factory Point, Virginia =

Peninsula in Virginia, US

Coordinates: 37°6′28.2″N 76°17′36.6″W

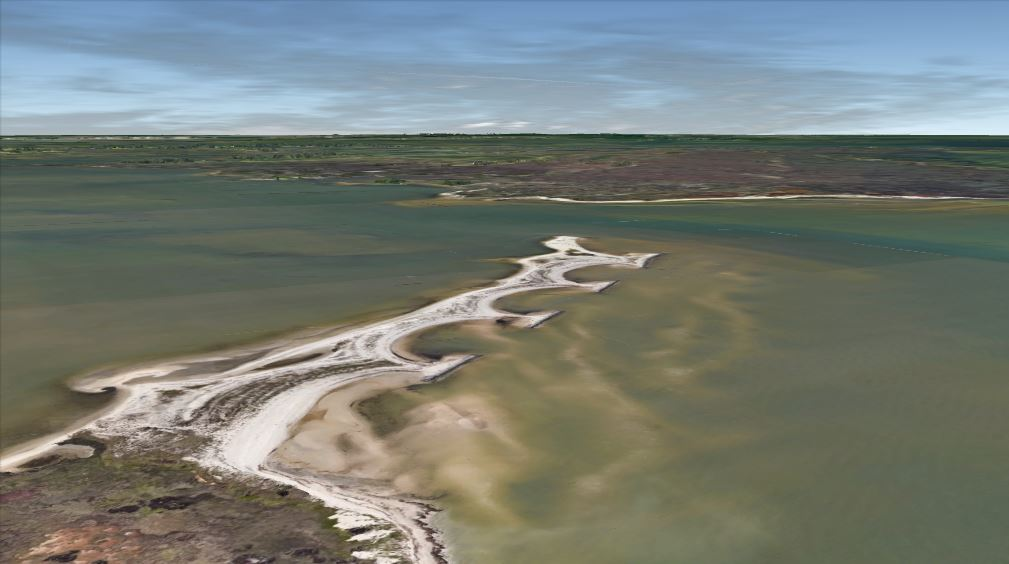
An aerial photograph

Factory Point is a land peninsula separating the Back River and the Chesapeake Bay in the Commonwealth of Virginia.

Factory Point has received much local attention due to erosion by a nor'easter. The peninsula is the buffer from wave action coming from the Chesapeake Bay into Back River. Consequently, it has protective value for thousands of homes that adjoin the river. In 1998, a spit of sand connecting Factory Point to Grand View Nature Preserve was washed away in a storm, reducing Factory Point to an island. However, the peninsular was rebuilt and reconnected in the spring of 2010.

It was once home to a bustling seaport and a center for shipbuilding in the 1800s.
