= Back River Light =

Lighthouse in Virginia, United States

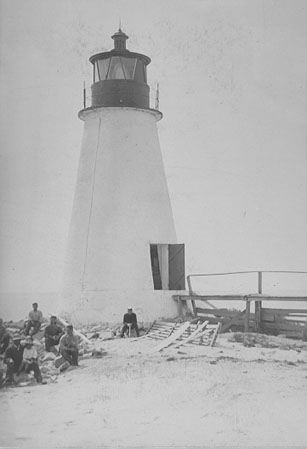
- Undated photograph of Back River Light, Virginia (USCG)
- Location: 1 nmi (1.9 km; 1.2 mi) south of the mouth of the Back River on the western shore of the Chesapeake Bay
- Coordinates: 37.0872°N 76.2698°W

Tower
- Construction: brick/masonry
- Automated: 1915
- Height: 30 feet (9.1 m)
- Shape: conical tower

Light
- First lit: 1829
- Deactivated: 1936
- Lens: Ten oil lamps and ten parabolic reflectors
- Characteristic: continuous revolving white with a 90 second interval

The Back River Light, also known as the Grandview Light, was a lighthouse south of the mouth of the Back River on the western shore of the Chesapeake Bay, several miles north of Fort Monroe near Hampton, Virginia. Plagued by erosion for most of its existence, it was destroyed in 1956 by Hurricane Flossy.

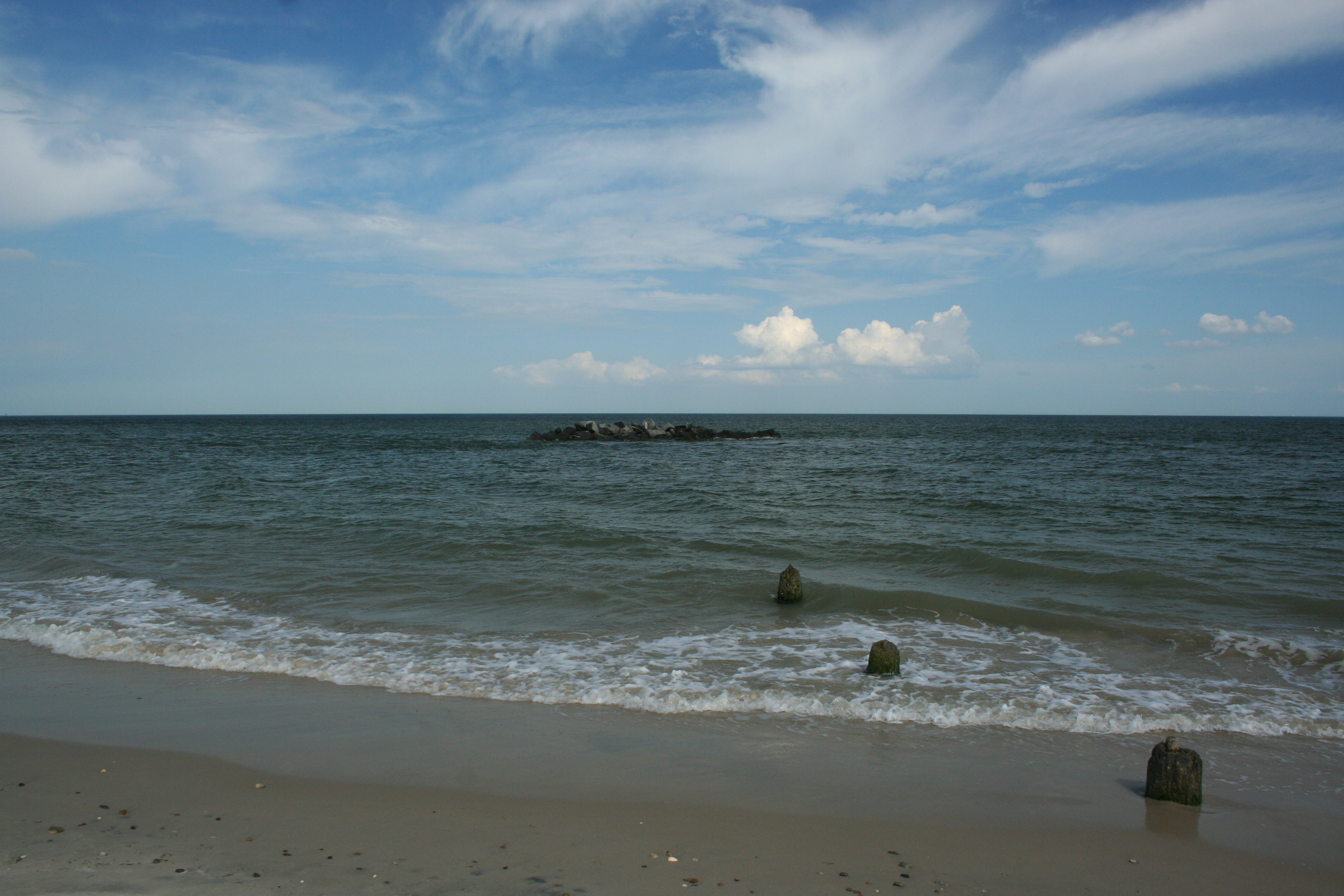
Photograph of Back River Lighthouse site taken on May 22, 2013

== History ==
This lighthouse constructed in 1829 by Winslow Lewis of Boston, was a 30-foot (9.1 m) conical masonry tower similar to others further up the bay. A hint of its coming travails was given by the need for a 144-foot (44 m) long footbridge to carry the keeper over the marshy land between the tower and his house. Ten oil lamps and ten parabolic reflectors fourteen inches in diameter, coated with pure silver, were initially installed. When placed in service, the light's ‘characteristic’ was described as “continuous revolving white with a 90-second interval. As technology improved it later housed a Fresnel lens.

The light was damaged by Confederate raiders in 1862, but was back in service the following year. But the remainder of the century saw a continuing battle against erosion, and riprap was laid around the base of the tower several times between 1868 and 1888. In 1894 a second story was added to the keeper's house, but this served only until 1914, when the house facing destruction due to beach erosion was demolished, with the light being automated the following year. The Back River Light was discontinued in 1936. Twenty years later the abandoned tower, by then in disrepair and completely surrounded by water due to erosion, collapsed during Hurricane Flossy, leaving only a pile of rubble to mark the spot.

=== Kane murder trial ===
In 1931 a drowning near the Back River Lighthouse resulted in a sensational murder trial that riveted the nation. The accused, Elisha Kent Kane, III, was a respected professor of Romance languages at the University of Tennessee and the scion of a prominent Pennsylvania family. His wife, Jenny Graham Kane, who was from nearby Newport News, had drowned under suspicious circumstances during a visit to the beach with him. Elisha's father, Evan O'Neill Kane, M.D. was a medical pioneer who gained acclaim for removing his own appendix and, years later, repairing his own hernia. His grandfather was Major General Thomas L. Kane who had founded Kane, Pennsylvania. His family tree also included Judge John Kintzing Kane, a former Pennsylvania Attorney General and close friend of U.S. President Andrew Jackson, and his namesake, U.S. Navy officer Elisha Kane, an American explorer who famously chronicled two unsuccessful mid-nineteenth century Arctic explorations in search of the lost expedition of Sir John Franklin

Due to Kane's family ties and position at the university, his murder trial at the Elizabeth City County Courthouse was covered by newspapers up and down the East Coast. Some even called it the trial of the century. After days of intense testimony, the jury deliberated for three hours and 45 minutes before finding Elisha not guilty. According to published reports, the verdict drew an immediate outburst of applause, but many thought Kane had gotten away with murder.
