= Tropical Storm Flossie (2013) =

Pacific tropical storm in 2013

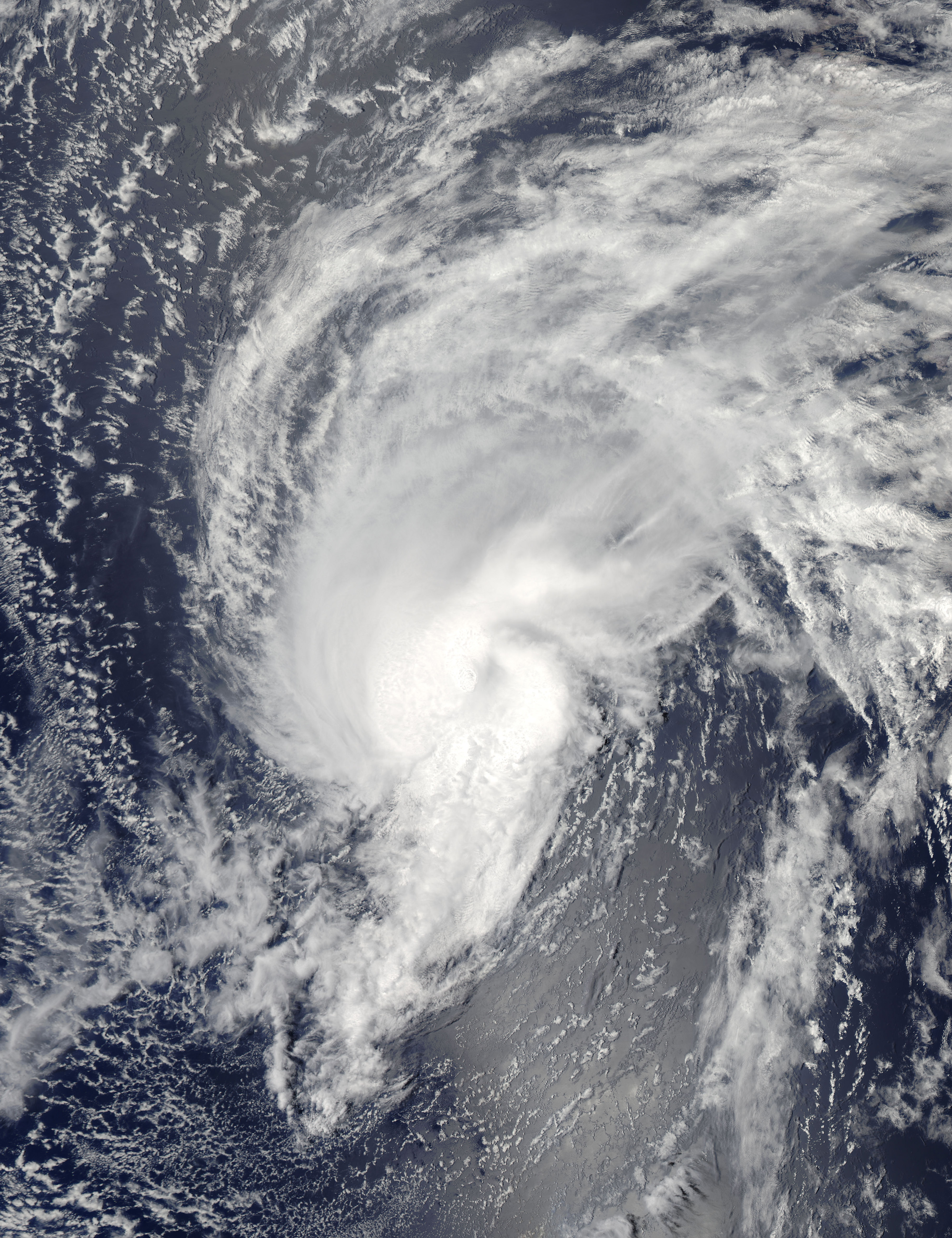
- Tropical Storm Flossie approaching Hawaii on July 28

Meteorological history
- Formed: July 25, 2013
- Dissipated: July 30, 2013

Tropical storm
- 1-minute sustained (SSHWS/NWS)
- Highest winds: 70 mph (110 km/h)
- Lowest pressure: 994 mbar (hPa); 29.35 inHg

Overall effects
- Fatalities: None reported
- Damage: $24,000 (2013 USD)
- Areas affected: Hawaii
- IBTrACS
- Part of the 2013 Pacific hurricane season

Tropical Storm Flossie yielded stormy weather to Hawaii in late July 2013. The sixth tropical cyclone and named storm of the annual hurricane season, Flossie originated from a tropical wave that emerged off the western coast of Africa on July 9. Tracking westward across the Atlantic with little development, it passed over Central America and into the eastern Pacific Ocean on July 18, where favorable environmental conditions promoted steady organization. By 06:00 UTC on July 25, the wave acquired enough organization to be deemed a tropical depression; it intensified into a tropical storm six hours later. Continuing westward, Flossie attained peak winds of 70 mph (110 km/h) on July 27 before entering the central Pacific Ocean. There, unfavorable upper-level winds established a weakening trend; on July 30, Flossie weakened to a tropical depression, and by 12:00 UTC that same day, the storm degenerated into a remnant low, northeast of Kauai.

In advance of Flossie, tropical cyclone warnings and watches were placed into effect for various Hawaiian Islands. In addition, numerous flash flood watches were issued in fear of over a foot of precipitation. Ports and numerous facilities were closed to the public, and authorities opened shelters for refuge. Upon approach, Flossie threatened to become the first tropical storm to make a direct hit on Hawaii in two decades; however, the system weakened prior to doing so. Flossie brought high surf to the state, leading to minor beach erosion. Gusty winds exceeded tropical storm threshold, downing numerous power poles and trees; as a result, several thousand locals were without power for a few days. The storm produced several inches of rainfall across the island, with a peak of 9.27 in (235 mm) on Mount Waialeale. Though one man was injured due to lightnings, no fatalities were reported in association with Flossie. Damage totaled to $24,000 (2013 USD) as a consequence of lightning.

== Meteorological history ==
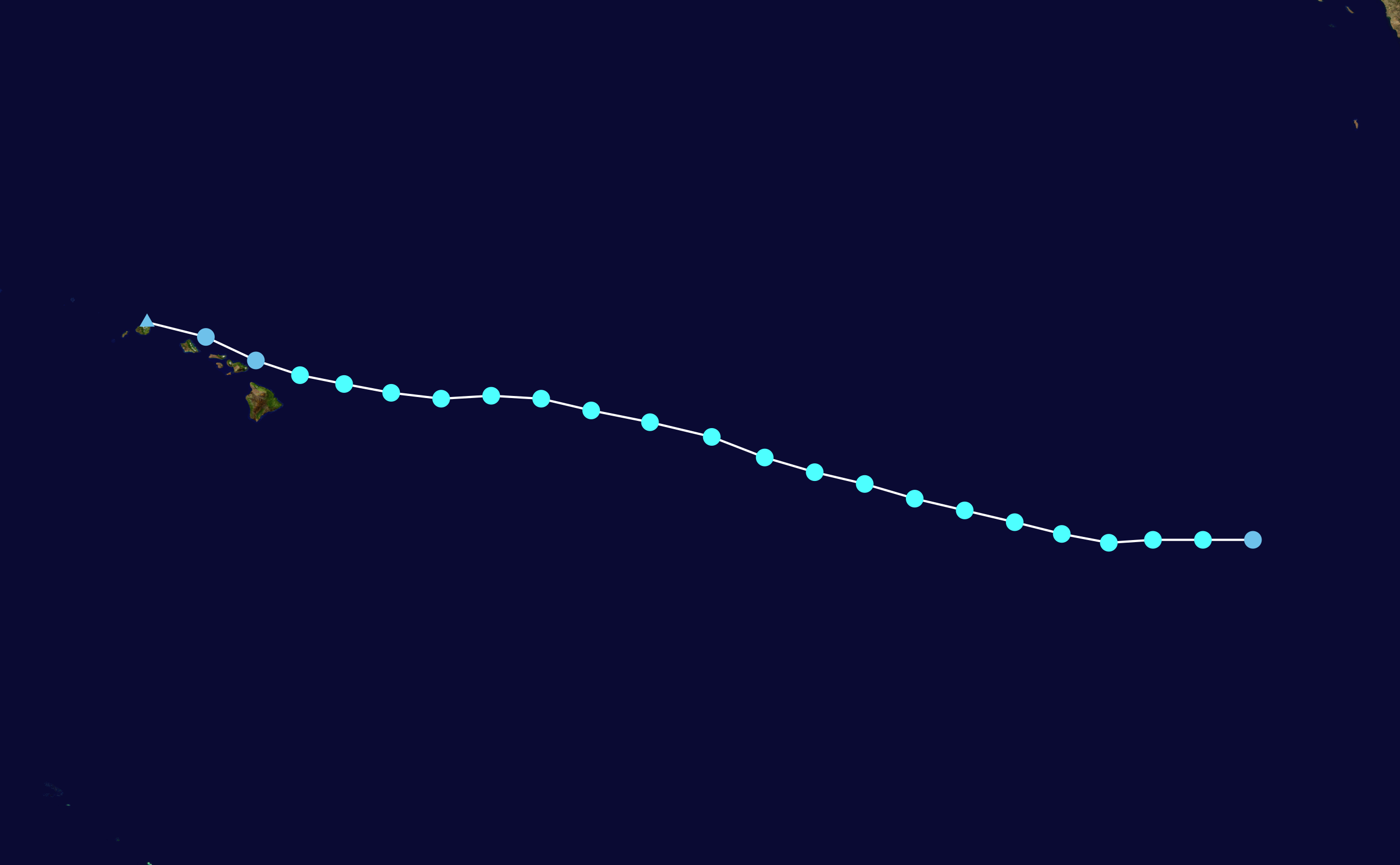
Map plotting the storm's track and intensity, according to the Saffir–Simpson scale Map key Saffir–Simpson scale Tropical depression (≤38 mph, ≤62 km/h) Tropical storm (39–73 mph, 63–118 km/h) Category 1 (74–95 mph, 119–153 km/h) Category 2 (96–110 mph, 154–177 km/h) Category 3 (111–129 mph, 178–208 km/h) Category 4 (130–156 mph, 209–251 km/h) Category 5 (≥157 mph, ≥252 km/h) Unknown Storm type Tropical cyclone Subtropical cyclone Extratropical cyclone, remnant low, tropical disturbance, or monsoon depression

On July 9, 2013, a tropical wave emerged off the western coast of Africa. Tracking swiftly westward across the Atlantic, it passed across Central America on July 18 and emerged into the eastern Pacific Ocean shortly thereafter. Early on July 21, a broad low-pressure area formed in association with the wave, and the National Hurricane Center (NHC) began monitoring the disturbance for slow development into a tropical cyclone accordingly. Shower and thunderstorm activity coalesced over the subsequent days, prompting the NHC to increase its chances for development to the high category; despite this, satellite data from early on July 24 did not reveal a well-defined circulation necessary for classification. By that evening, a combination of visible and microwave satellite imagery depicted an improvement of the vortex, and the system was upgraded to a tropical depression at 00:00 UTC on July 25, while situated 980 miles (1,575 km) west-southwest of the southern tip of the Baja California peninsula.

The depression tracked west to west-northwest upon classification, steered by a mid-level ridge centered over the southwestern United States. Deep convection increased in coverage and intensity over the following hours, leading to an increase in satellite intensity estimates; at 06:00 UTC, the depression was upgraded to Tropical Storm Flossie. Within an environment of low wind shear and warm sea surface temperatures, Flossie gradually intensified over the next two days; a mid-level eye became observable in microwave imagery and intermittently on visible satellite imagery by early on July 27. At 1200 UTC, the system attained its peak intensity with maximum sustained winds of 70 mph (110 km/h) and a minimum barometric pressure of 994 mb (hPa; 29.35 inHg). Thereafter, Flossie crossed the 140th meridian west into the central Pacific Ocean, where the Central Pacific Hurricane Center (CPHC) assumed responsibility of the system. Unfavorable upper-level winds in association with an upper-level trough began to impede the system's organization around this time, and it began a slow weakening trend.

In conjunction with high wind shear, marginal ocean temperatures caused deep convection in association with Flossie to weaken and become ragged; as a result, the forecast called for continued weakening. Instead, a brief reprieve in upper-level winds allowed the system to intensify to a secondary peak of 65 mph (100 km/h) by 12:00 UTC on July 28. An anticyclone northwest of the system increased shear atop the system once again by the following day, and dry air began to become ingested into the circulation. The low-level vortex became exposed to view and progressively ill-defined as outflow boundaries in association with a previous convective burst impeded on the low. At 00:00 UTC on July 30, Flossie was downgraded to a tropical depression; after the circulation became indistinguishable on satellite imagery twelve hours later, the system was declared a remnant area of low pressure. At this time, the vortex was centered near the northern coast of Kauai.

== Preparations and impact ==
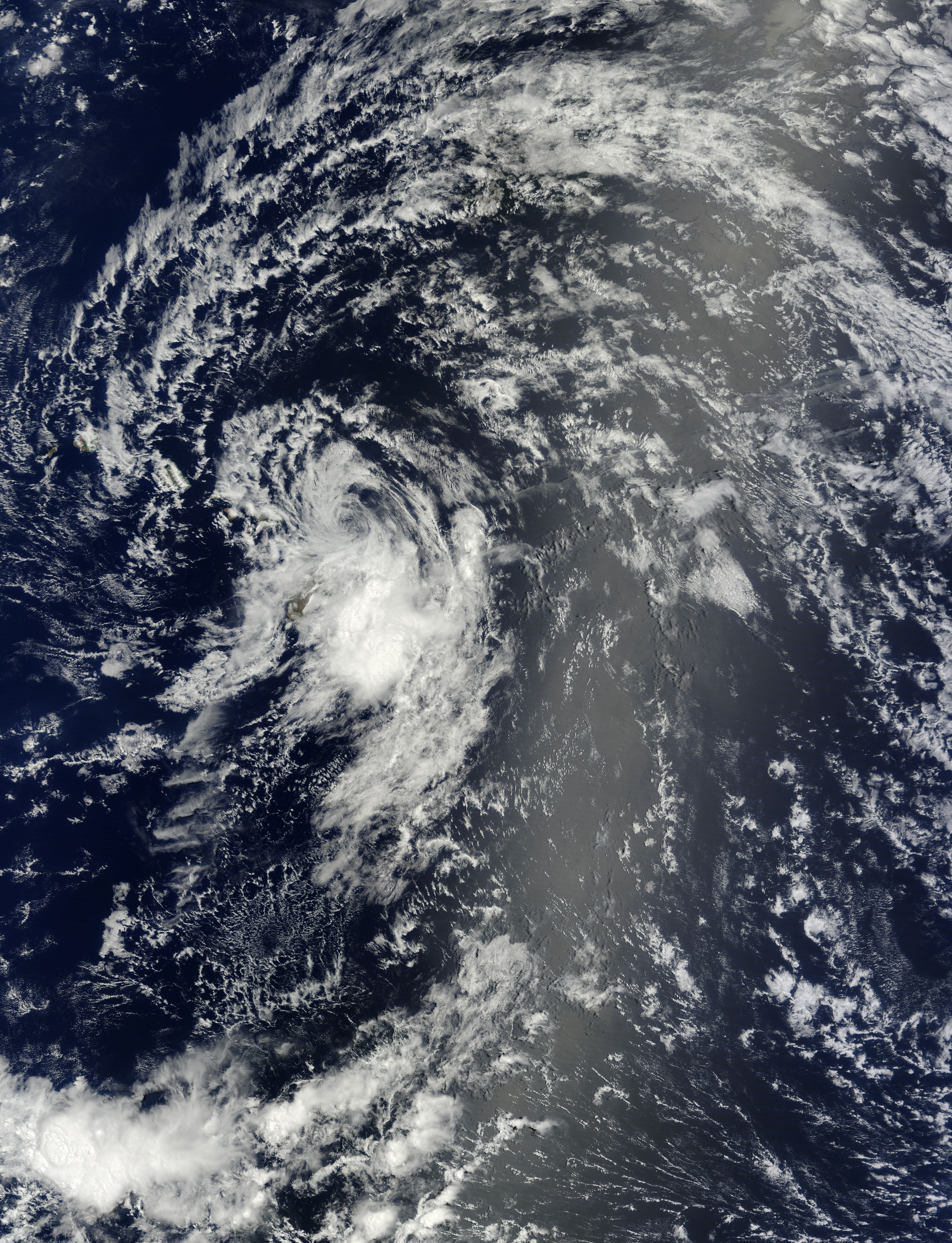
Tropical Storm Flossie over Hawaii on July 29

Upon entering the central Pacific Ocean, Flossie prompted the issuance of a tropical storm watch for Hawaii and Maui counties on July 27. This was upgraded to a tropical storm warning hours later, while Oahu was placed under a tropical storm watch. Due to the threat of heavy rain, forecast to reach 15 inches (380 mm) in localized areas, a flash flood watch was issued for all of Hawaii, valid between July 29 and 30. All Maui County parks were closed due to the storm as county authorities activated emergency operations. Along the Big Island, all courts and colleges were closed. Hawaii Governor Neil Abercrombie signed an emergency proclamation. Three ports were closed, including two on the Big Island and one on Maui. Under the anticipation that Flossie would become the first tropical storm to make landfall in the state since 1992, authorities opened 11 shelters across the state, including four on Maui and seven on Oahu. In total, 177 persons used these shelters. A scheduled water outage in Hanalei and Waipa was postponed due to the storm.

While still offshore, Flossie brought high surf to much of the state. Upon passing narrowly by the island, gusty winds downed trees and power lines: Kahului reported a peak wind gust of 47 mph (76 km/h) during Flossie. More than 10,000 residences were without electricity across the state, with most outages concentrated in Maui and Big Island. Heavy rains impacted several islands; rainfall rates of 3 to 4 in (76 to 102 mm) an hour were recorded in Haleakalā. Along the eastern side of Maui, a total of 5.3 in (130 mm) was reported in the Kaupo Gap, while a storm-total peak of 9.27 in (235 mm) was observed on Mount Waialeale. One man was injured in Maui due to lightning. Damage from lightning across the state amounted to $24,000. Six vehicle accidents were reported and several roads required closure, but overall, damage from Flossie was relatively minor.

== See also ==
- Other storms of the same name
- List of Hawaii hurricanes
- Hurricane Iselle (2014)
- Hurricane Darby (2016)
