= Virginia State Route 152 =

State highway in southeastern Virginia, US

State Route 152

Route information
- Maintained by VDOT
- Length: 5.18 mi (8.34 km)
- Existed: 1946–present

Major junctions
- West end: US 60 in Newport News
- US 17 / SR 143 in Newport News
- East end: US 258 / SR 134 in Hampton

Location
- Country: United States
- State: Virginia
- Counties: City of Newport News, City of Hampton

Highway system
- Virginia Routes; Interstate; US; Primary; Secondary; Byways; History; HOT lanes
← SR 151	→ SR 153

State Route 152 (SR 152) is a primary state highway in the U.S. state of Virginia. The state highway runs 5.18 miles (8.34 km) from U.S. Route 60 (US 60) in Newport News east to US 258 and SR 134 in Hampton. Although running primarily from west to east, it is signed south to north.

== Route description ==
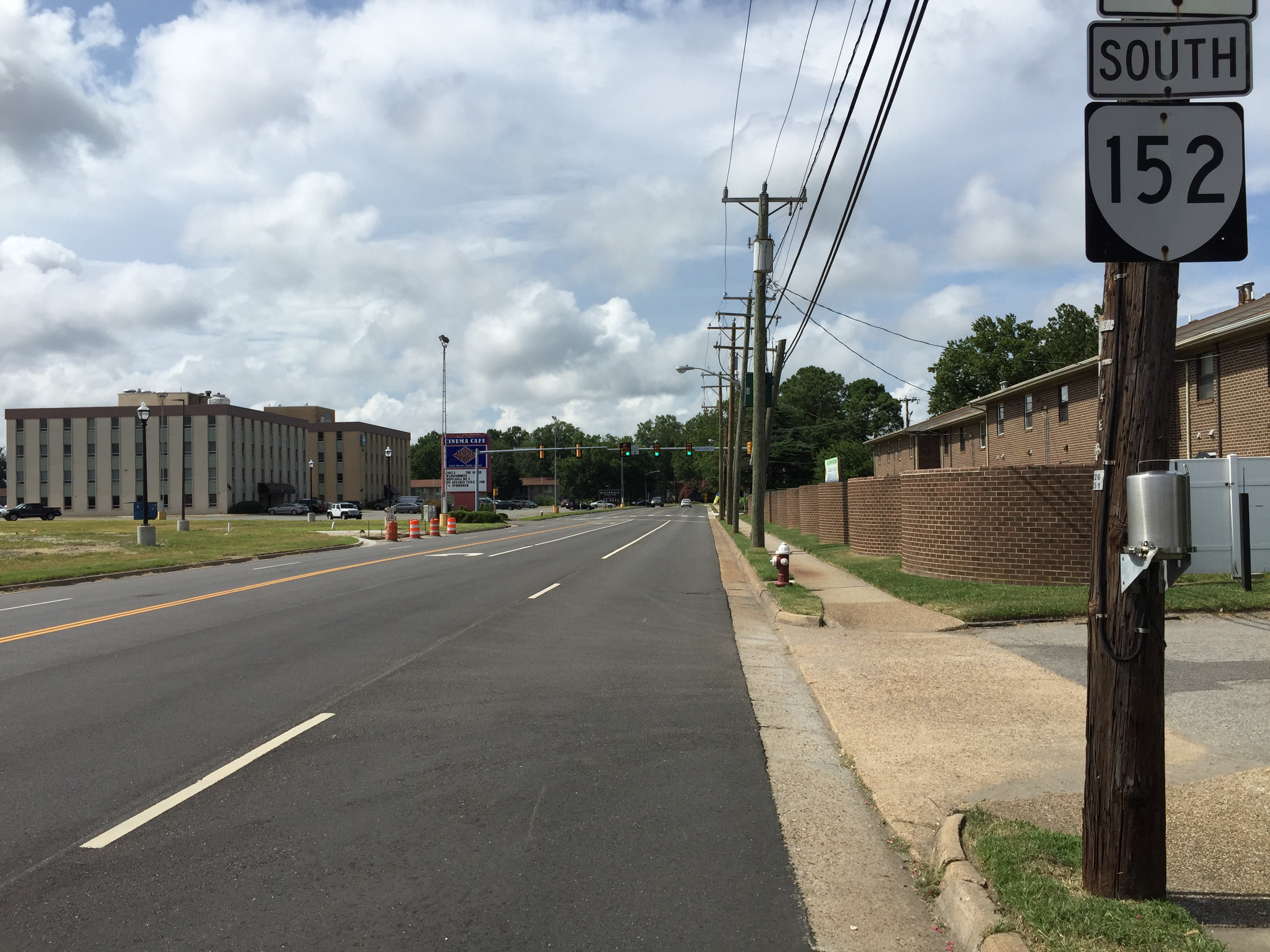
View south at the north end of SR 152 at US 258/SR 134 in Hampton

SR 152 begins at an intersection with US 60 (Warwick Boulevard) in the Hilton Village neighborhood of the independent city of Newport News. The state highway heads east as Main Street, a four-lane undivided highway that passes under CSX's Peninsula Subdivision and intersects US 17 and SR 143 (Jefferson Avenue). SR 152 continues northeast through a residential area to Newmarket Creek, where the highway crosses into the city of Hampton. The state highway continues east as Todds Lane, which intersects the north–south thoroughfares Big Bethel Road and Hunt Club Boulevard. When Todds Lane veers southeast, SR 152 continues as Cunningham Drive, a four-lane divided highway. Just before passing over Interstate 64 (I-64) with no access, the westbound direction receives a ramp from southbound SR 134, which runs concurrently with I-64 for a short distance north of the Interstate's junction with US 258. SR 152 passes along the north side of Peninsula Town Center and intersects Coliseum Drive, where the highway becomes undivided again. The state highway curves south to reach its eastern terminus at US 258 and SR 134 (Mercury Boulevard).

== Major intersections ==
County	Location	mi	km	Destinations	Notes
City of Newport News		0.00	0.00	US 60 (Warwick Boulevard)	Southern terminus
City of Newport News		0.41	0.66	US 17 / SR 143 (Jefferson Avenue)	
City of Hampton				Todds Lane to SR 415	
City of Hampton		5.18	8.34	US 258 / SR 134 (West Mercury Boulevard)	Northern terminus
1.000 mi = 1.609 km; 1.000 km = 0.621 mi
