= Tabb, Virginia =

Tabb
- Unincorporated community
- Etymology: Mary Octavia Tabb
- Location within Virginia
- Coordinates: 37°07′24″N 76°27′27″W
- Country: United States
- State: Virginia
- County: York County

Population (2014)
  - Total: 23,807
- Postal code: 23693

Tabb is an unincorporated community in York County, Virginia, United States, on the Virginia Peninsula. Major roads include U.S. Route 17 and State Route 134 (Hampton Highway, which continues as Neil Armstrong Parkway in Hampton).

The community was named for Mary Octavia Tabb, who served as postmaster from 21 December 1893 until early 1910, as per National Archives and Records Administration. It is home to Tabb High School, one of four high schools in York County. It is also home to Tabb Middle School, Tabb Elementary School, and Mount Vernon Elementary School.

Tabb is served by the US Postal Service ZIP code 23693. The ZIP code area had an estimated population of 23,807 in 2014. Tabb, Virginia uses the mailing address of Yorktown. This area is also referred to as York County. York County is one of the eight original shires formed in colonial Virginia in 1682.

Tabb is primarily a residential community, with a few commercial interests. The largest employer in Tabb is a Walmart Supercenter department store built in the early 2000s on the site of a former Cinema-City drive-in theater and grocery store at the intersection of U.S. Route 17 and State Route 171. Other major employers nearby include the NASA Langley Research Center, Newport News Shipbuilding, Naval Weapons Station Yorktown and Joint Base Langley-Eustis. With a number of small farms that offer fresh locally grown produce, and equestrian facilities, the community serves as a rural escape for the nearby cities of Hampton and Newport News. Predominantly rural until the late 20th century, the community has rapidly grown in recent decades in both population and commercialization.

The first organized land battle of the Civil War, the Battle of Big Bethel, was fought on land in nearby Hampton as well as the area that later became Tabb. During the 1862 Peninsula Campaign of the Civil War, Yorktown was captured by the Union after the Battle of Yorktown. The York County area was then used as a base by the Union Army under General George B. McClellan to launch an unsuccessful attack on Richmond (then the capital of the Confederacy).

== Thorpland Plantation ==
The historic Thorpland Plantation, a colonial manor house begun in the 17th century on land originally patented by Christopher Calthorpe on July 13, 1635, is located in Tabb on Victory Blvd. It is among the oldest wood frame houses still standing in America. Calthorpe, the grandson of an English knight, who was born into a well connected Norfolk family that had held manorial property in East Anglia since the 14th century, arrived in Virginia in 1622 as a teenager. In Jamestown he boarded with George Sandys the treasurer of the Colony of Virginia who introduced him to the Governor, Francis Wyatt. By 1636 Calthorpe had acquired 1,800 acres of land in Virginia and become prominent in planter class society. He represented York County in the House of Burgesses and served as a justice of the peace from 1652 to 1661. Thorpland, named after the Calthorpe (also spelled Calthrop) family estate in England, was one of many plantations that existed in this area during the 17th century. Although the large plantation was broken up into smaller family farms over the next three centuries, many of which have since been sold for residential development, the area is still known as "Calthrop Neck" in the 21st century.
