= Back River (Virginia) =

Estuarine inlet of the Chesapeake Bay in Virginia, US

Coordinates: 37°04′06.0″N 76°20′32.4″W

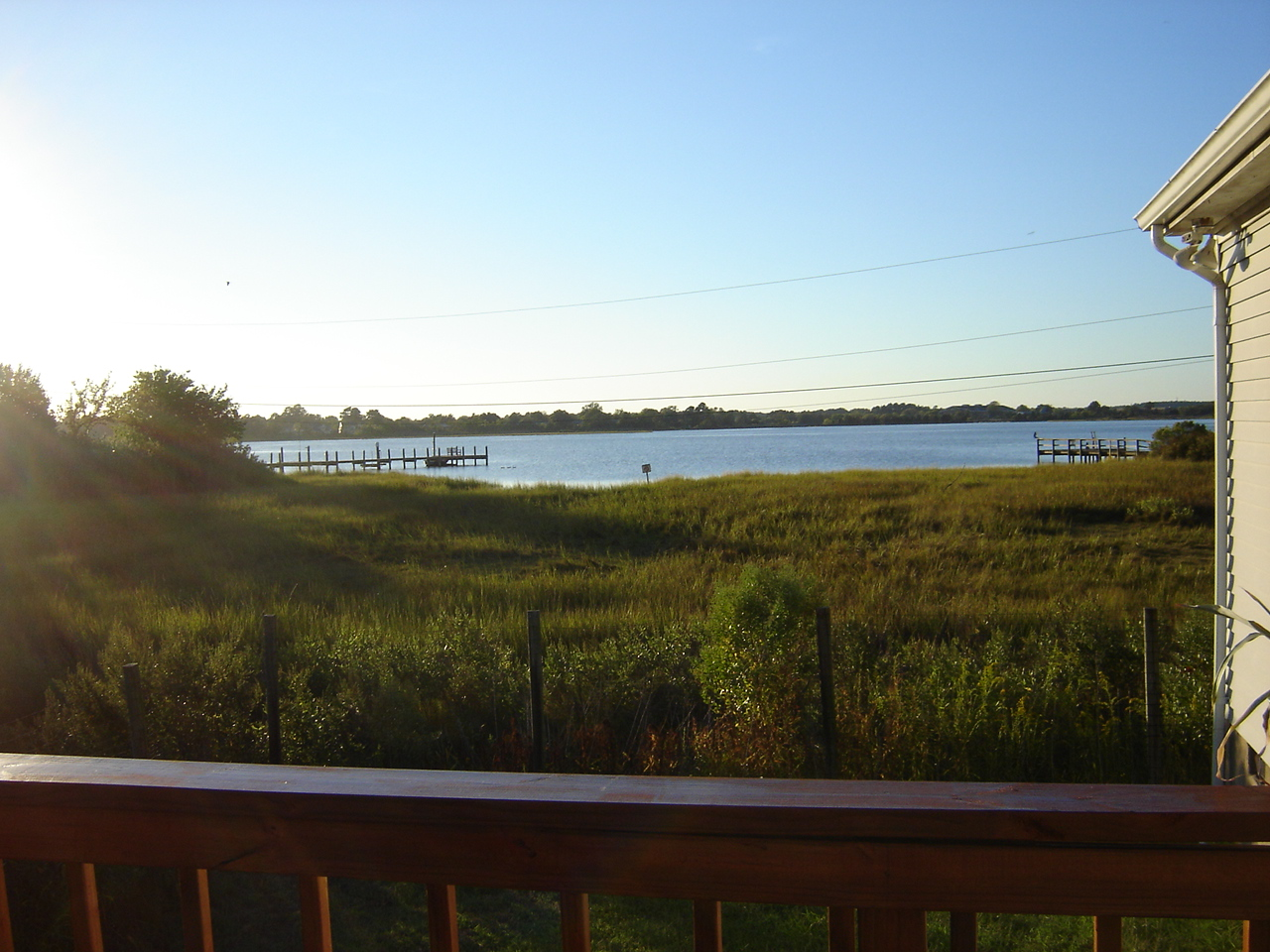
View of Back River

The Back River is an estuarine inlet of the Chesapeake Bay between the independent cities of Hampton and Poquoson in the Hampton Roads area of southeastern Virginia. Formed by the confluence of the Northwest and Southwest Branches, and at just over two miles (3.2 km) long, the Back River is a breeding ground for many of the Bay's prized sport fish and the well known blue crab. The river was once part of an important fishing area that provided the local canneries with the famous Chesapeake seafood that was, and still is in demand throughout the country. Although now used primarily for recreation and as a wildlife refuge, the river remains a place for fishing and laying crab traps. Factory Point, a peninsula that protects the river from the Chesapeake Bay sits at the mouth of the river adjoining the bay.

The Southwest Branch begins as Newmarket Creek, a marshy, tidal creek which flows from its headwaters in Newport News into Hampton where it widens greatly and empties into the river.

The Northwest Branch also begins in Newport News as Brick Kiln Creek and is dammed along with the Hampton city and York County border to form Big Bethel Reservoir. It flows from the reservoir into Poquoson, where it becomes the Northwest Branch.

The Back River Lightstation, or Grandview Light, formerly stood on a windswept beach at the mouth of the river. Constructed in 1829 by Winslow Lewis, with a cost of $4,250, the thirty-foot brick tower displayed its light until 1915, when it was automated and the keepers removed. In 1936, the station was decommissioned and left open to the elements and vandals. Hurricane Flossy in 1956 delivered the final blow and toppled the tower. All that can be seen today is a pile of debris just off the beach.

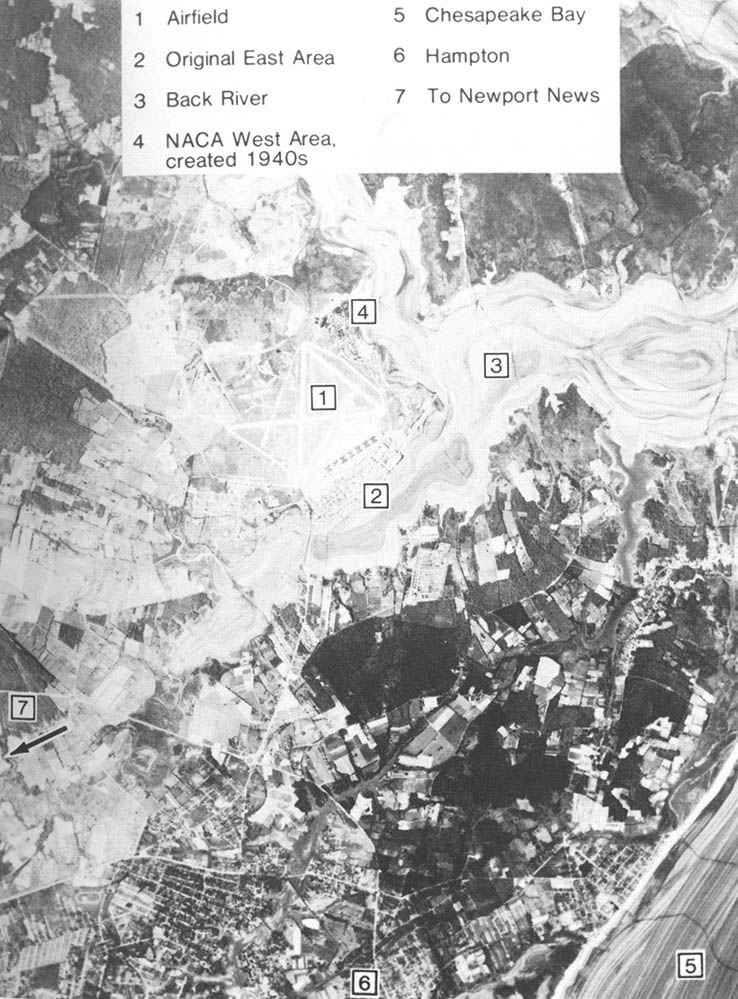
Aerial View of Back River, Virginia in the 1950s.

== See also ==
- List of rivers of Virginia
