= List of storms named Flossie =

The name Flossie, or Flossy, has been used for nineteen tropical cyclones worldwide, two the Atlantic Ocean, eight in the Eastern Pacific Ocean, and nine in the Western Pacific Ocean.

In the Atlantic:

- Hurricane Flossy (1956) Category 1 Hurricane that made landfall on the Gulf Coast
- Hurricane Flossie (1978) Long-Lived Category 2 hurricane that stayed out to sea

In the Eastern Pacific:

- Tropical Storm Flossie (1983) – did not affect land.
- Tropical Storm Flossie (1989) – weak storm that paralleled the Mexican coast.
- Hurricane Flossie (1995) – category 1 hurricane that brushed Baja California Sur.
- Hurricane Flossie (2001) – category 2 hurricane whose remnants caused flooding in California.
- Hurricane Flossie (2007) – category 4 hurricane that passed near Hawaii.
- Tropical Storm Flossie (2013) – almost made landfall in Hawaii, but moved to the north and weakened.
- Hurricane Flossie (2019) – category 1 hurricane that neared Hawaii as a tropical depression.
- Hurricane Flossie (2025) – category 3 hurricane that paralleled the Mexican coast.

In the Western Pacific:

- Tropical Storm Flossie (1950) (T5007)
- Typhoon Flossie (1954) (T5404)
- Typhoon Flossie (1958) (T5817) – affected Japan.
- Tropical Storm Flossie (1961) (T6109, 28W)
- Typhoon Flossie (1964) (T6409, 12W) – struck China.
- Typhoon Flossie (1966) (T6622, 24W)
- Tropical Storm Flossie (1969) (T6912, 15W) – approached Taiwan.
- Typhoon Flossie (1972) (T7218, 18W, Nitang)
- Typhoon Flossie (1975) (T7516, 19W) – struck southern China.
