= Plum Tree Island National Wildlife Refuge =

United States National Wildlife Refuge in Virginia

- IUCN category IV (habitat/species management area)
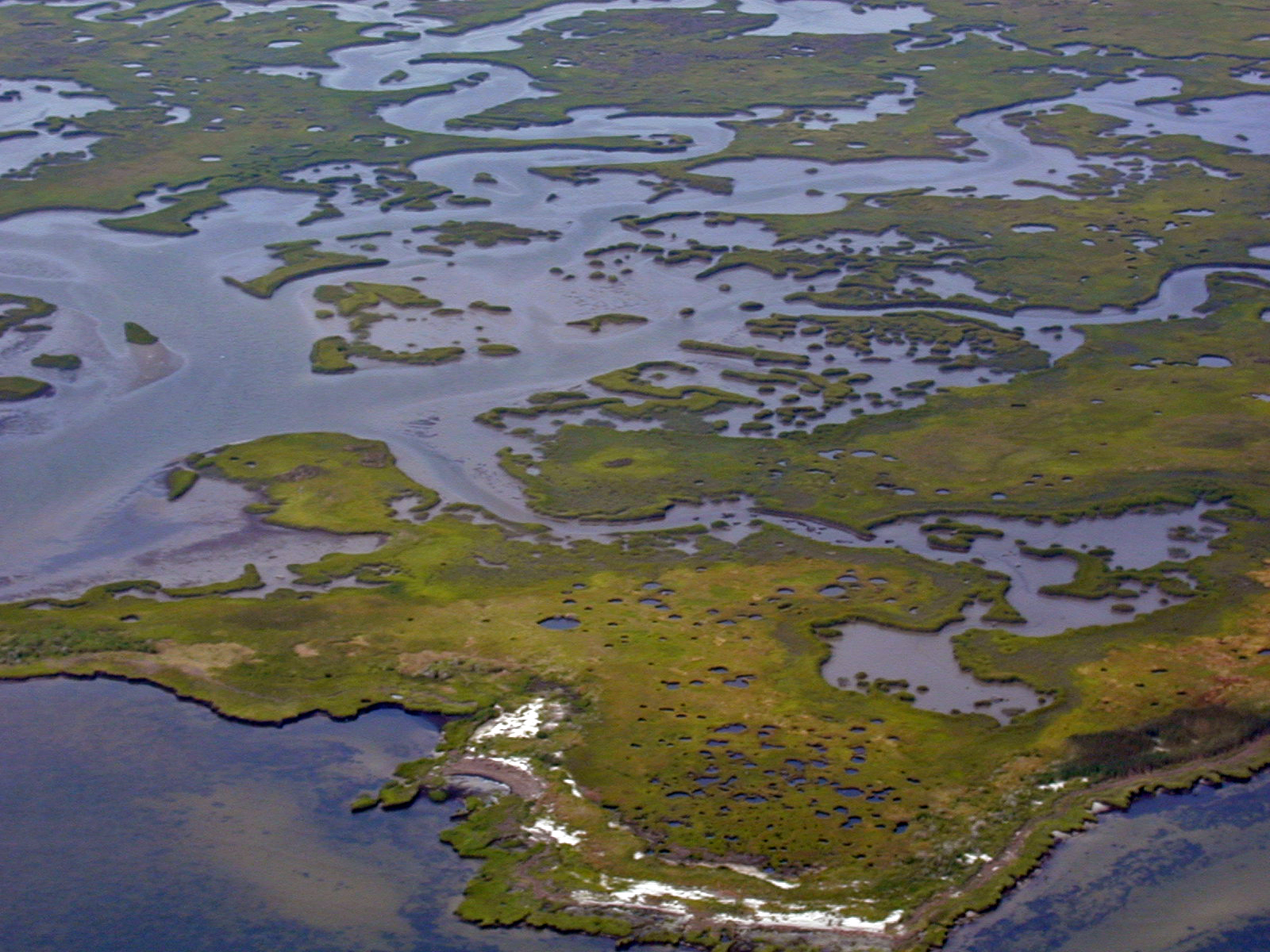
- Aerial view of Plum Tree Island National Wildlife Refuge

- Location within Virginia Location within the United States
- Location: Poquoson, Virginia, United States
- Coordinates: 37°08′24″N 76°19′39″W
- Area: 3,501 acres (14.17 km^{2})
- Established: 1972
- Governing body: U.S. Fish and Wildlife Service
- Website: Plum Tree Island National Wildlife Refuge

The Plum Tree Island National Wildlife Refuge is a National Wildlife Refuge in Poquoson, Virginia, located on the southwestern corner of the Chesapeake Bay. The 3,501-acre (14.17 km^{2}) refuge is located at about the midpoint of the Atlantic Flyway, and is one of four refuges that comprise the Eastern Virginia Rivers National Wildlife Refuge Complex.

Prior to being transferred to the jurisdiction of the United States Fish and Wildlife Service in 1972, the preserve's lands were owned by the United States Department of Defense and used as a bombing range. Due to the amount of unexploded ordnance that remains, only the 200-acre (0.81 km^{2}) Cow Island portion of the refuge is open to the public.
