= Hurricane Flossy (1956) =

Category 1 Atlantic hurricane in 1956

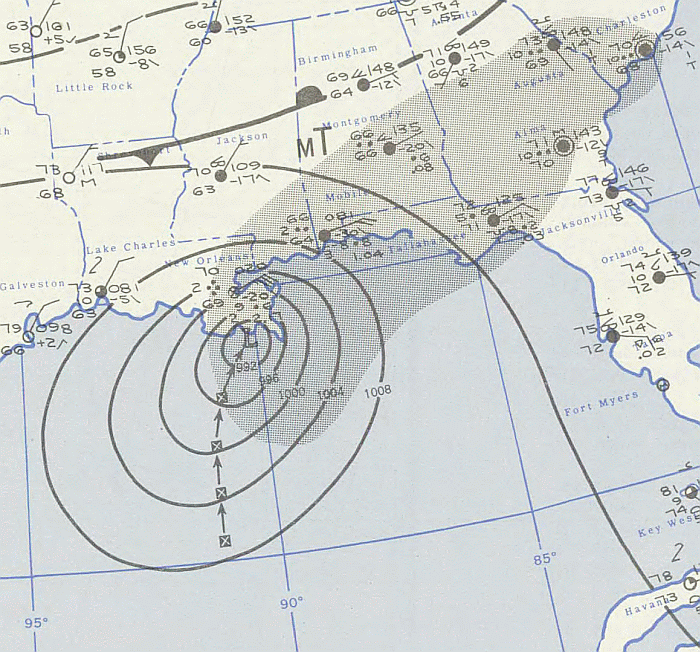

Meteorological history
- Formed: September 20, 1956
- Extratropical: September 25, 1956
- Dissipated: October 3, 1956

Category 1 hurricane
- 1-minute sustained (SSHWS/NWS)
- Highest winds: 90 mph (150 km/h)
- Lowest pressure: 974 mbar (hPa); 28.76 inHg

Overall effects
- Fatalities: 15
- Damage: $24.9 million (1956 USD)
- Areas affected: Yucatán Peninsula, United States Gulf Coast, East Coast of the United States
- IBTrACS
- Part of the 1956 Atlantic hurricane season

Hurricane Flossy originated from a tropical disturbance in the eastern Pacific Ocean and moved across Central America into the Gulf of Mexico as a tropical depression on September 21, 1956, which became a tropical storm on September 22 and a hurricane on September 23. The hurricane peaked with maximum sustained winds of 90 mph (140 km/h) before it struck the central Gulf coast of the United States as a Category 1 hurricane on September 24, and evolved into an extratropical cyclone on September 25. It was the first hurricane to affect oil refining in the Gulf of Mexico. The tropical cyclone led to flooding in New Orleans, and broke a drought across the eastern United States. The death toll was 15, and total damages reached $24.8 million (1956 USD).

== Meteorological history ==
Map plotting the storm's track and intensity, according to the Saffir–Simpson scale Map key Saffir–Simpson scale Tropical depression (≤38 mph, ≤62 km/h) Tropical storm (39–73 mph, 63–118 km/h) Category 1 (74–95 mph, 119–153 km/h) Category 2 (96–110 mph, 154–177 km/h) Category 3 (111–129 mph, 178–208 km/h) Category 4 (130–156 mph, 209–251 km/h) Category 5 (≥157 mph, ≥252 km/h) Unknown Storm type Tropical cyclone Subtropical cyclone Extratropical cyclone, remnant low, tropical disturbance, or monsoon depression

A tropical disturbance moved northward, crossing Guatemala from the eastern Pacific Ocean into the northwest Caribbean Sea between September 20 and September 21. It became a tropical cyclone soon after emerging into the Caribbean, and moved across the Yucatán Peninsula as a tropical depression before becoming a tropical storm in the Gulf of Mexico on September 22 and a hurricane on September 23. It turned sharply east-northeast across the Mouth of the Mississippi river on September 24 as a minor hurricane. The storm continued east-northeast and made landfall in Florida east of Pensacola. The system evolved into an extratropical cyclone soon after passing out of the Sunshine State and continued moving east to northeast hugging the Atlantic Seaboard to near the Virginia Capes before moving slowly through the shipping lanes between Canada and Bermuda, blocked by a high pressure system in southeast Canada.

== Preparations ==
By the morning of September 22, hurricane watches were posted for the upper Texas and Louisiana coasts. By the morning of September 24, hurricane warnings were in effect from Grand Isle, Louisiana to Fort Walton Beach, Florida while storm warnings were in effect from Morgan City, Louisiana to St. Marks, Florida. The approach of the hurricane led to the evacuation of 15 aircraft from Florida to Ardmore Air Force Base, in Oklahoma.

== Impact ==
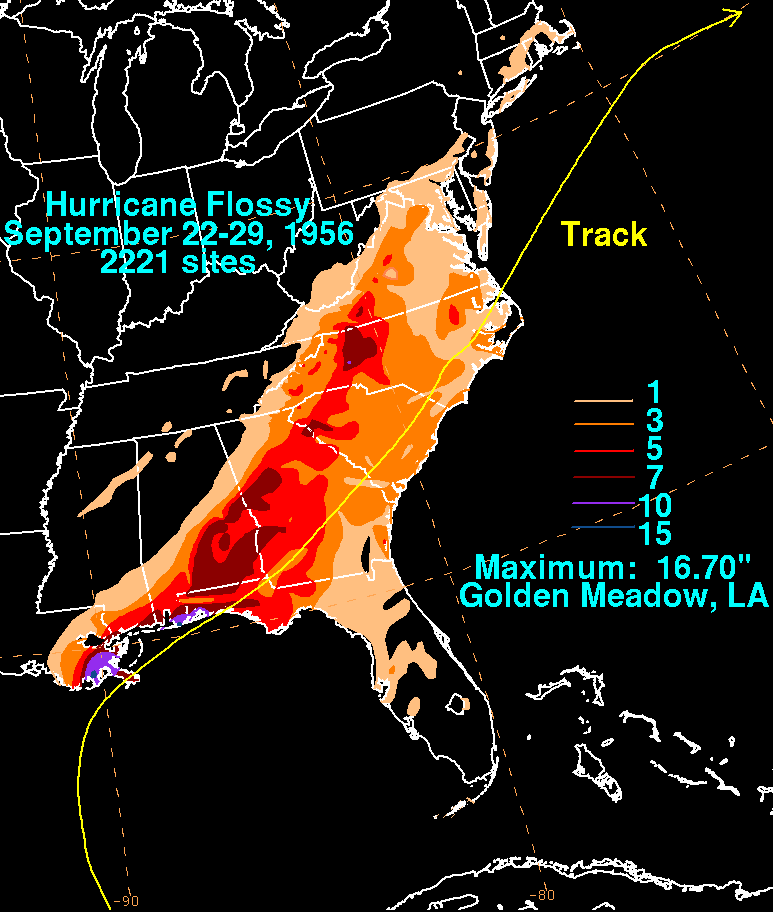
Flossy's rainfall in the United States

=== Gulf of Mexico ===
This was the first hurricane to cause significant disruption to oil refining in the Gulf of Mexico. Several hundred active wells went out of service, and drilling came to a halt for a few days during and after the cyclone's passage. One of Humble company's tenders saw three-quarters of its mooring chains compromised, which swung it around into an adjacent oil platform, causing $200,000 in damage (1956 USD). The cost to downtime in production was greater than the damage Flossy created to the oil rigs. There was no loss of life. Due to the impact of Flossy on oil refining in the Gulf of Mexico, the American Petroleum Institute formed a committee called Fundamental Research on Weather Forecasting. Their goal was to use mathematical models and historic data to better predict hurricane formation and path. Studies went on into 1962, but no reliable forecast mechanism was found.

=== United States ===
In Louisiana, wind-blown sand from the beach spread over area highways due to the hurricane. A total of 16.70 inches (424 mm) of rainfall fell at Golden Meadow, Louisiana. Burrwood, Louisiana's pressure fell to 29.03 inHg (983.1 hPa or mb). Hundreds lost their homes in the storm. The storm surge was significant enough to submerge Grand Isle, Louisiana. At Ostrica Lock, the storm tide reached 13 feet (4.0 m). Extensive coastal erosion was caused by the cyclone across the Mississippi Delta. In New Orleans, Louisiana, about 2.5 square miles (6.5 km^{2}) were flooded as portions of the seawall were overtopped. Cattle drowned across the region, and crops such as citrus, sugar cane, and pecan were heavily damaged.

Winds as high as 66 mph (106 km/h) struck coastal Mississippi. A total of 16.30 inches (414 mm) of rain fell at Gulf Shores. In Montgomery, Alabama, the tent used to house the Eastern Hills Baptist Church was destroyed. Across northern Florida, southern Alabama, and Georgia, Flossy was considered drought-breaking. In southwest Georgia, high winds from Flossy damaged the corn and cotton crops. The lowest pressure reported was 28.93 inches/979.8 hPa or mb at Pensacola Naval Air Station. The storm tide at Laguna Beach, Florida, reached 7.4 feet (2.3 m) above mean sea level. As tides damaged some piers and small craft, and resulted in severe beach erosion. At least three tornadoes touched down throughout northern Florida in association with Flossy. One damaged or destroyed numerous structures in Gulf County; two others in Jefferson and Suwannee counties caused little or no damage.

Further northeast, rains brought by Flossy helped relieve drought conditions across the Carolinas, and were considered beneficial. Winds as high as 45 miles per hour (72 km/h) were recorded in Washington, D.C. In Virginia, the gas screw vessel Mary Anne was lost at Naval Station Norfolk. High tides caused by the then-extratropical cyclone led to water 2.5 feet (0.76 m) deep in sections of Norfolk. The Back River Light collapsed during the storm, 127 years after it was built. This occurred despite 500 short tons (450 tonnes) of broken rock placed around its base to protect it from the surf. Severe flooding occurred along the state's coastline, including interior bays.

Total damages to Louisiana, Florida, Alabama, the Carolinas, and Virginia was $24.8 million (1956 USD).

== See also ==
- Other storms of the same name
- List of wettest tropical cyclones in Louisiana
- List of Florida hurricanes (1950–1974)
