= Floss =

Floss commonly refers to:

- Dental floss
- Meat floss
- Floss (dance)

Floss or FLOSS may also refer to:

== Places ==
- Floß, in English spelling: Floss, a municipality in Bavaria, Germany
- Floß (river), in English spelling: Floss, a river of Bavaria, Germany

== Art, entertainment, and media ==
- Floss (mixtape), by Injury Reserve
- "Floss" (song), by AJ Tracey
- Floss McPhee, a character in the soap opera Home and Away
- Silken Floss, a character in the comic and film The Spirit

== Computing ==
- Free/libre and open-source software
- FLOSS Weekly, a podcast of the twit.tv Network

== People with the given name ==
- Floss Casasola (1903–1991), a British Honduran teacher involved in the Belizean Independence Movement

== People with the surname ==
- Heinrich Joseph Floss (1819–1881), a church historian and theologian
- Herbert Floss (1912–1943), an SS functionary of Nazi Germany
- Walter J. Floss Jr. (1923–2018), American politician

== Other uses ==
- Candy floss, or fairy floss (cotton candy)
- Common floss, another name for the shrub Chromolaena odorata
- Embroidery floss, thread used in embroidery
- Floss flower, another name for Ageratum houstonianum

== See also ==
- Al Flosso (1895–1976), American magician
- Gaston Flosse (born 1931), French politician
